= Siege of Edessa =

Siege of Edessa may refer to:

- Siege of Edessa (116), Roman–Parthian Wars
- Siege of Edessa (163), Roman–Parthian Wars
- Siege of Edessa (165), Roman–Parthian Wars
- Siege of Edessa (503), Roman–Sasanian Wars
- Siege of Edessa (544), Roman–Sasanian Wars
- Siege of Edessa (610), Roman–Sasanian Wars
- Siege of Edessa (630), Roman–Sasanian Wars
- Siege of Edessa (1031), Arab–Byzantine wars
- Siege of Edessa (1144), Crusades
- Siege of Edessa (1146), Crusades

== See also ==
- Battle of Edessa, between the Roman and Sassanid Empires, 260
