= Kanishka's Central Asian campaign =

2nd century Kushan Empire conquest of Central Asia

Kanishka's Central Asian Campaign
- Part of Campaigns of Kanishka I
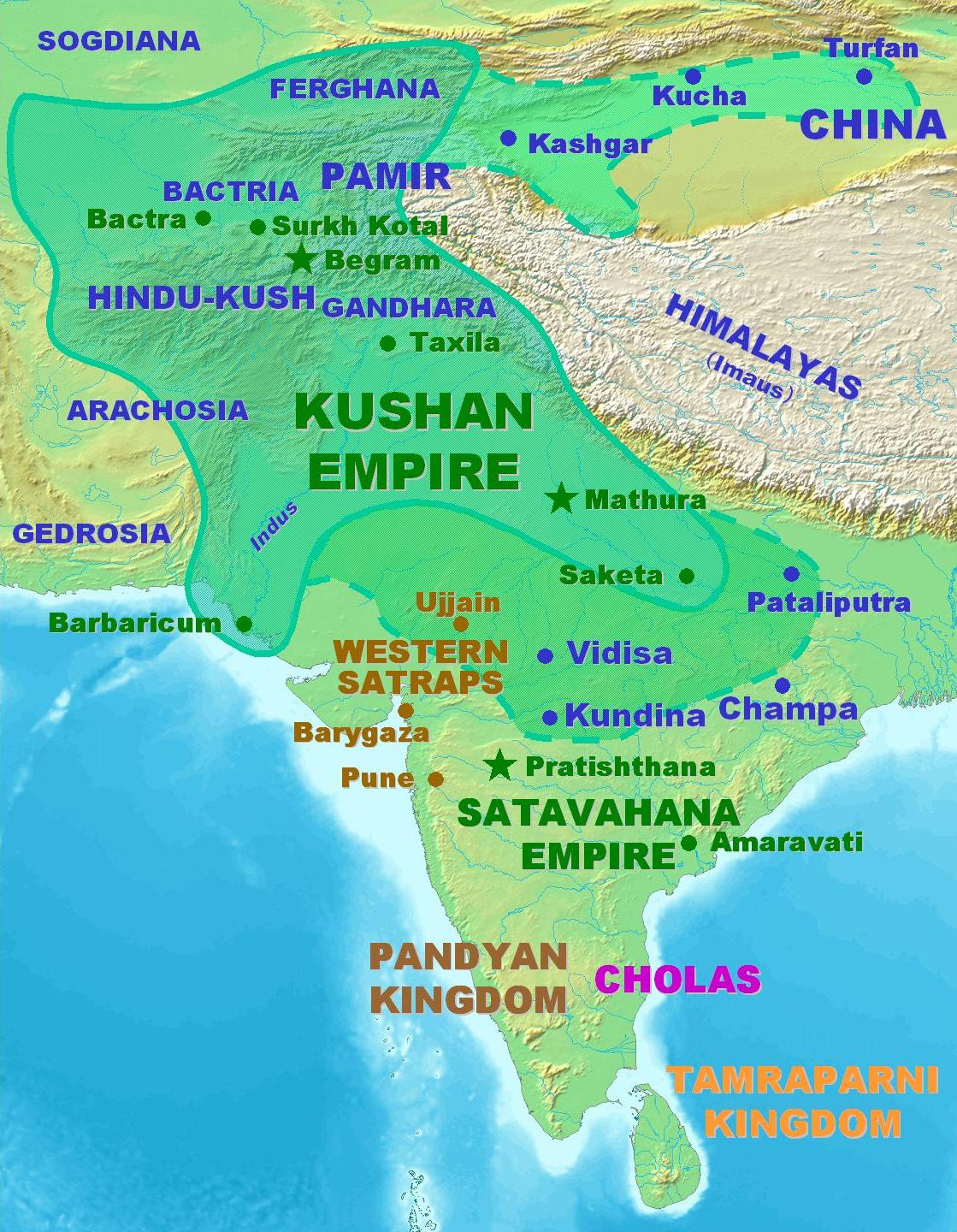
- Kanishka's empire after his campaigns
Date	c. 2nd century CE
Location	Central Asia, Afghanistan, and Western China
Result	Kushan victory: Expansion of the Kushan Empire into Central Asia; Control of key Silk Road trade routes; Han withdrawal from Central Asia; Decline of remaining Greco-Bactrian and Indo-Scythian powers; Spread of Buddhism and later Hinduism into Central Asia
Territorial changes	Greater Bactria, Kashghar, Yarqand, and Khotan annexed to the Kushan Empire

Belligerents
Kushan Empire	Greco-Bactrian Kingdom; Indo-Scythians; Parthian Empire; Local Central Asian tribes Supported by: Han dynasty

Commanders and leaders
Kanishka I Huvishka; Vasudeva I	Unknown

Strength
Unknown	Unknown

Casualties and losses
Unknown	Unknown

Kanishka's Central Asian Campaign refers to the military conquests led by Kanishka, the Kushan emperor, likely in the early to mid 2nd century CE. (Note: As mentioned in the first two sources cited next to this note - the lack of substantial written records from the Kushan authorities, along with reliance on accounts from neighbouring civilisations, creates uncertainty about the precise years of the empire’s activities.)

His military offensive focused on Bactria, a region in Central Asia, comprising parts of modern-day Afghanistan, Uzbekistan, and Tajikistan. This campaign resulted in Kushan's dominance over Silk Road trade routes and facilitated the exchange of Indian cultural and religious ideas, notably of Buddhism, throughout Central Asia. Kanishka's conquests are also perceived as key factors in accelerating the decline of the Greco-Bactrian and Indo-Scythian civilizations, which were already in retreat in the region.

== Background ==
During the 2nd century CE, Emperor Kanishka embarked on a series of military campaigns to expand his the Kushan Empire's borders. He also had converted to Buddhism at promoted it at the state level, while seeking to facilitate its spread. Historians evaluate several primary reasons for Kanishka to invade Central Asia. These include securing Kushan dominance over the Silk Road, bolstering the imperial economy, and facilitating the spread of Indian Kushan culture and religion, particularly Buddhism, into the region.

Kushan's invading forces encountered a Bactria region that had already lived under foreign domination and adopted their invaders' cultural influences, ranging from the Achaemenids to Alexander the Great, and later the Indo-Greek and Indo-Scythian kingdoms. In this context, Kanishka's conquest of Bactria further transformed the region by mixing Indian elements derived from Kushan rule with the pre-existing Persian and Hellenistic conventions adopted from earlier rulers.

== The military campaigns ==
In the second century CE, Kanishka's forces mobilized north from the Indian sub-continent and crossed Kashmir's Karokam Mountains towards Bactria. The offensive captured major cities such as Kabul (Kaofu), Bagram (Begram), and Peshawar (Peshawar) and regions farther north as Sogdiana, Fergana and East Turkestan. This campaign effectively established Kushan control over key Silk Road routes across Central Asia.

These campaigns targeted local tribal confederations and remnants of the Greco-Bactrian and Indo-Scythian powers, whose influence had waned but still nominally controlled territories seen as valuable to the Kushan. Re-discoveries of imperial Kushan coinage in the region in the 19th and 20th centuries further detailed the extent of Kushan conquest and subsequent influence in Central Asia.

== Han Chinese reaction ==
As the Han Empire became aware of Kanishka's conquest of large parts of Central Asia and the Kushan Empire's consolidation of control there, it perceived the Kushans as a threat to its western flank and sought to stymie their expansion. According to the Hou Hanshu, a Kushan army of 70,000 troops engaged the Han general Ban Chao near Khotan in 90 CE. Despite Ban Chao's scorched-earth strategy, the large Kushan force demonstrated their capacity to challenge Han power in the Tarim Basin (in present-day Xinjiang region of Western China), which included areas like Kashghar, Khotan, and Yarkand.

== Aftermath ==
Kanishka's campaigns had a lasting impact on the Kushan Empire and the region. The conquest of Greater Bactria and control of key Silk Road routes strengthened the Kushan economy and fostered extensive cultural syncretism, incorporated Zoroastrian, Hindu Shaivite, and Greeco-Roman themes into the dominant Buddhist culture. The Kushans played a central role in spreading Buddhism to Central Asia and China under Kanishka's reign. The successor Kushan ruler, Vasudeva I, spread Hinduism in Central Asia. Despite the Chinese Han dynasty maintaining its influence in parts of the Tarim Basin, the Kushans managed to solidify their presence elsewhere in the region and contribute a lasting impact.

The Kushan Empire would control Bactria for roughly a century, after which its power was challenged by an ascendant Sasanian Empire based in present-day Iran. Slightly after 225 CE, the last year in which Kushan inscriptions in the region are dated, the Sasanians are believed to have invaded Bactria. They defeated the Kushan Empire in a campaign lasting several years as part of an eastward expansion, establishing their eastern boundary at the Indus River.

== See also ==
- Kanishka's War with Parthia
- Kanishka's conquest of Greater Bactria

== Sources ==
- Klostermaier, Klaus K. (2007). A Survey of Hinduism: Third Edition. SUNY Press. ISBN 9-780-791-47082-4.
- Michaels, Axel (2004). Hinduism. Past and present. Princeton, New Jersey: Princeton University Press.
