= Kanishka's conquest of Greater Bactria =

Battle of Kanishka the greats conquests in Central Asia

- Part of Kanishka's Central Asian campaign
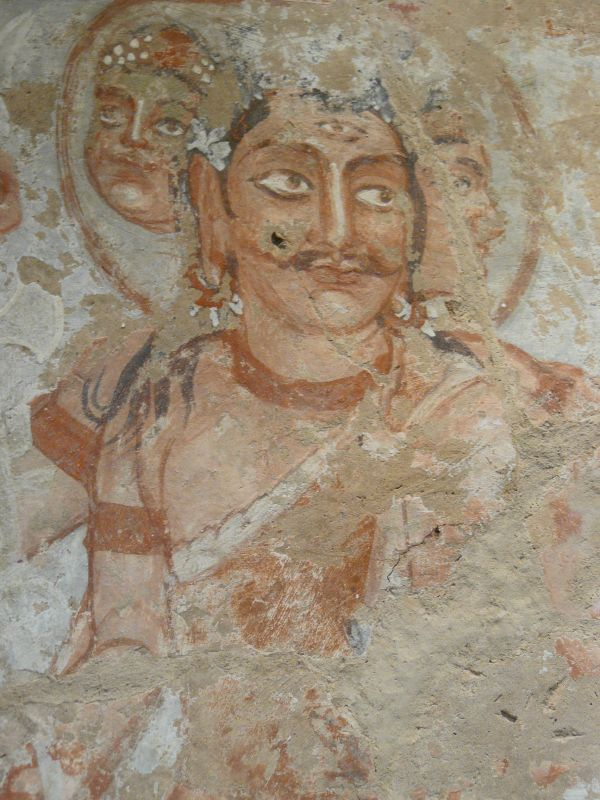
- Kushan era Lord Shiva panel in Bactria
Location
Result
Greater Bactria, Central Asia
Kushan victory
- Kanishka conquered Greater Bactria
- Silk road trade came under Kushan control

Belligerents
Kushan Empire	Parthian Empire

Commanders and leaders
Kanishka I	Unknown

Kanishka's conquest of Greater Bactria happened during the greater Kushan conquest of Central Asia, when the Parthian Empire lost major parts of its significant province of Bactria to the expanding Kushan Empire, led by its ruler Kanishka I.

== Background ==
Kanishka, the Kushan emperor (c. 127–150 CE), is known for his expansionist policies, including the conquest of Greater Bactria, an ancient region in Central Asia. This territory, comprising parts of modern-day Afghanistan, Tajikistan, and Uzbekistan, had previously been under Hellenistic influence after Alexander the Great’s conquests and later the Greco-Bactrian Kingdom. Kanishka’s campaigns helped consolidate Kushan control over key trade routes, enhancing their influence in the Silk Road network and spreading Buddhist culture across Central Asia.

== Aftermath ==
Following Kanishka’s conquest, the region was integrated into the Kushan Empire, strengthening the empire’s control over vital trade routes, including the Silk Road. The Kushan influence in Bactria also helped bridge Greco-Roman, Persian, and Indian cultural elements, fostering a rich fusion of art, architecture, and religious traditions.
