= Vologases III of Parthia =

King of Parthia from 110 to 147

Vologases III 𐭅𐭋𐭂𐭔
- King of Kings
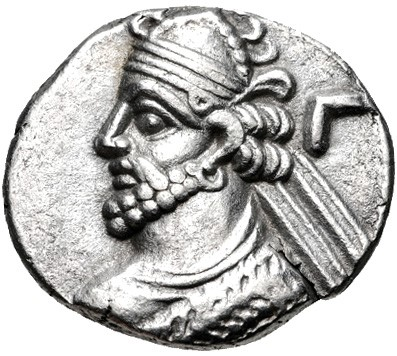
- Coin of Vologases III, minted at Seleucia in 121/2

King of the Parthian Empire
- Reign: 110 – 147
- Predecessor: Pacorus II (predecessor); Osroes I (rival king); Mithridates V (rival king)
- Successor: Vologases IV
- Died: 147
- Dynasty: Arsacid dynasty
- Father: Pacorus II
- Religion: Zoroastrianism

Vologases III (Parthian: 𐭅𐭋𐭂𐭔 Walagash) was king of the Parthian Empire from 110 to 147. He was the son and successor of Pacorus II (r. 78–110).

Vologases III's reign was marked by civil strife and warfare. At his ascension, he had to deal with the usurper Osroes I (r. 109–129), who managed to seize the western part of the empire, which left Vologases III in control of its eastern parts. After Osroes I violated the Treaty of Rhandeia with the Romans by appointing Parthamasiris as the king of Armenia in 113, the Roman emperor Trajan (r. 98–117) invaded the Parthian lands, briefly seizing the Parthian cities of Seleucia and Ctesiphon and reaching as far as the Persian Gulf. These gains were short-lived; all the Roman gains had been lost after Trajan's death in 117. Vologases III, whose eastern domains were untouched, took advantage of the weakened state of Osroes I to regain lost territory, and finally defeated him in 129. Another contender named Mithridates V shortly appeared afterwards, but was also defeated by Vologases III, in 140.

Vologases III had to face an invasion by the nomadic Alans from 134 to 136, while in the east, he sought to increase the political and military actions as a response to the enlargement of the Kushan Empire. Under the Roman emperor Antoninus Pius (r. 138–161), disturbance once occurred in Armenia due to the Romans appointing a new king in Armenia. Vologases III, however, did not protest, either due to not being powerful enough, or possibly because he did not want to put the thriving long-distance trade in jeopardy, from which the Parthian state was gaining hefty income from. Vologases III was succeeded by Mithridates V's son Vologases IV in 147.

== Name ==
Vologases is the Greek and Latin form of the Parthian Walagaš (𐭅𐭋𐭂𐭔). The name is also attested in New Persian as Balāsh and Middle Persian as Wardākhsh (also spelled Walākhsh). The etymology of the name is unclear, although Ferdinand Justi proposes that Walagaš, the first form of the name, is a compound of words "strength" (varəda), and "handsome" (gaš or geš in Modern Persian).

== Reign ==
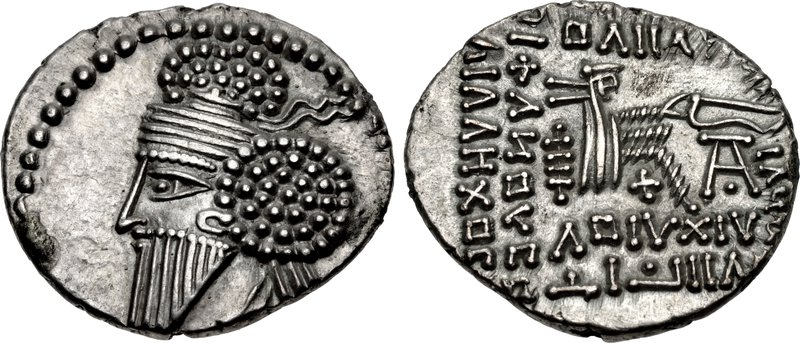
Coin of Osroes I (r. 109–129)

Vologases III was a son of Pacorus II (r. 78–110). During the last years of Pacorus' reign, Vologases III co-ruled with him. A Parthian contender named Osroes I appeared in 109. Pacorus died in the same year, and was succeeded by Vologases III, who continued his father's struggle with Osroes I over the Parthian crown. Osroes I managed to seize the western part of the empire, including Mesopotamia, while Vologases III ruled in the east. Osroes I violated the Treaty of Rhandeia with the Romans by deposing Vologases III's brother Axidares and appointing the latter's brother Parthamasiris as the king of Armenia in 113. This gave the Roman emperor Trajan (r. 98–117) a pretext to invade the Parthian domain and take advantage of the ongoing civil war between Vologases III and Osroes I. Trajan conquered Armenia and turned it into a Roman province in 114. In 116, Trajan captured Seleucia and Ctesiphon, the capitals of the Parthians. Trajan even reached as far as the Persian Gulf, where he forced the Parthian vassal ruler of Characene, Attambelos VII, to pay tribute. Fearing a revolt by the Parthians, Trajan installed Osroes I's son Parthamaspates on the throne at Ctesiphon.

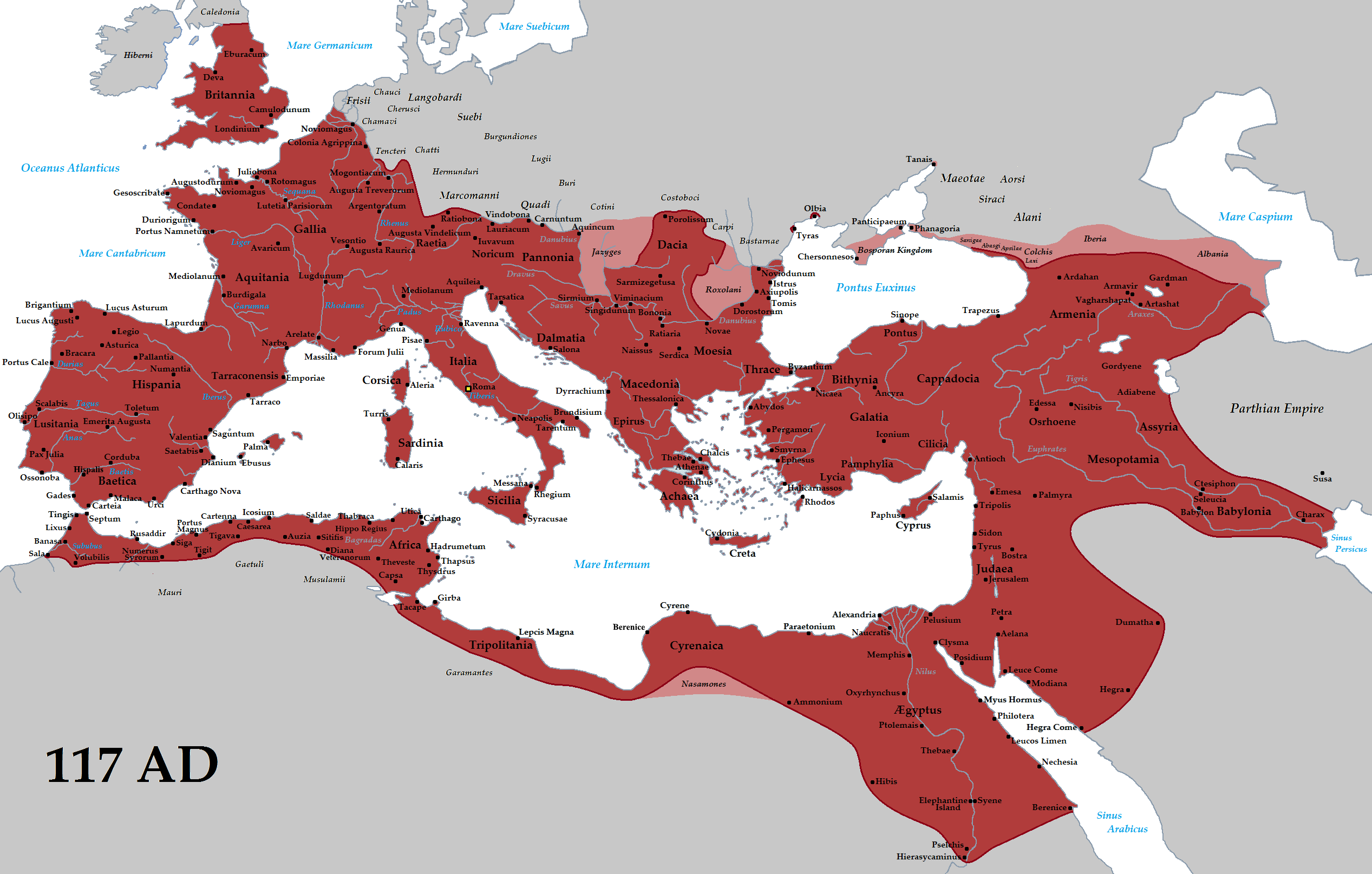
The extent of the Roman Empire under Trajan (r. 98–117)

However, these gains were short-lived; revolts occurred in all the conquered territories, with the Babylonians and Jews pushing the Romans out of Mesopotamia, and the Armenians causing trouble under the leadership of a certain Sanatruk. After Trajan's death in 117, the Parthians removed Parthamaspates from the throne and reinstated Osroes I. Trajan's successor, Hadrian (r. 117–138) renounced the remnants of Trajan's conquests in the east, and acknowledged the Treaty of Rhandeia, with the Parthian prince Vologases becoming the new king of Armenia. The weakened state of the western part of the Parthian Empire gave Vologases III—whose eastern domains were untouched—the opportunity to regain lost territory seized by Osroes I.

Vologases III finally managed to remove Osroes I from power in 129. However, shortly afterwards, a new contender named Mithridates V appeared. Vologases III also faced new challenges in other places; in 134, the king of Iberia, Pharasmanes II (r. 117–138) caused the nomadic Alans to invade the domains of the Parthians and Romans. They reached as far as Caucasian Albania, Media, Armenia, and also Cappadocia; they were eventually repelled two years later after many obstacles and heavy economic costs. In the east, Vologases III sought to increase the political and military actions as a response to the enlargement of the Kushan Empire. Vologases III defeated and deposed Mithridates V in 140.

Under Hadrian's successor, Antoninus Pius (r. 138–161), a disturbance occurred after the Romans appointed a new king in Armenia. Vologases III, however, did not protest, either due to not being powerful enough, or possibly because he did not want to put the thriving long-distance trade in jeopardy, from which the Parthian state was gaining hefty income. He may have attempted to recover lands lost previously to the Kushan Empire. A lone Buddhist source records that the Kushan ruler Kanishka I defeated a Parthian invasion during the time of Vologases III.

Vologases III was succeeded by Mithridates V's son Vologases IV in 147.

== Coinage and rock reliefs ==
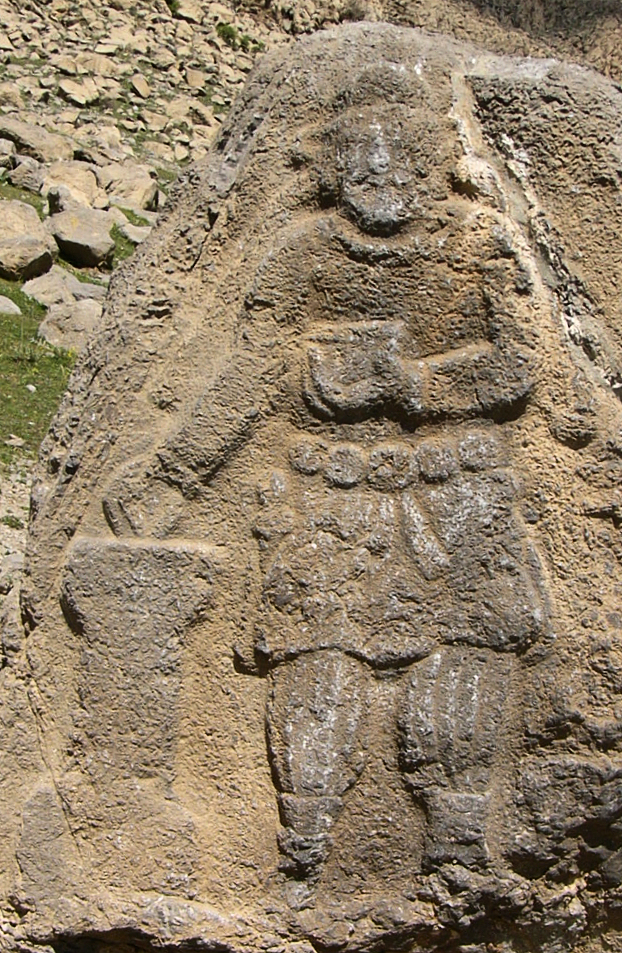
Rock relief of Vologases III at Behistun

Under Pacorus II, the usage of the image of the Greek goddess Tyche on the reverse of the Parthian coins became more regular than that of the seated king with a bow, specifically on the coin mints from Ecbatana. This was reversed under Vologases III. Rarely, a fire temple is depicted on the reverse of his coins. On the obverse of his coins is a portrait of him using the same tiara as his father. A rock relief at Behistun portrays a Parthian monarch, most likely Vologases III.

== Sources ==
- Badian, Ernst (2002). "Hadrian". Encyclopaedia Iranica, Vol. XI, Fasc. 4. p. 458.
- Bivar, A.D.H. (1968). "The Political History of Iran Under the Arsacids". In Fischer, William B. (ed.). The Cambridge History of Iran. Vol. 3a. Cambridge: Cambridge University Press. pp. 21–99. ISBN 0-521-06935-1.
- Chaumont, M. L. (1986). "Armenia and Iran ii. The pre-Islamic period". Encyclopaedia Iranica, Vol. II, Fasc. 4. pp. 418–438.
- Chaumont, M. L.; Schippmann, K. (1988). "Balāš". Encyclopaedia Iranica, Vol. III, Fasc. 6. pp. 574–580.
- Dąbrowa, Edward (2012). "The Arsacid Empire". In Daryaee, Touraj (ed.). The Oxford Handbook of Iranian History. Oxford University Press. pp. 1–432. ISBN 978-0-19-987575-7. Archived from the original on 2019-01-01.
- Gregoratti, Leonardo (2017). "The Arsacid Empire". In Daryaee, Touraj (ed.). King of the Seven Climes: A History of the Ancient Iranian World (3000 BCE - 651 CE). UCI Jordan Center for Persian Studies. pp. 1–236. ISBN 9780692864401.
- Ghirshman, Roman (1965) [1954]. Iran: From the Earliest Times to the Islamic Conquest. Baltimore: Penguin Books. ISBN 978-0-14-020239-7.
- Hansman, John (1991). "Characene and Charax". Encyclopaedia Iranica, Vol. V, Fasc. 4. pp. 363–365.
- Kettenhofen, Erich (2004). "Trajan". Encyclopaedia Iranica. pp. 418–438.
- Kia, Mehrdad (2016). The Persian Empire: A Historical Encyclopedia. ABC-CLIO. ISBN 978-1610693912. (2 volumes)
- Olbrycht, Marek Jan (1997). "Parthian King's tiara - Numismatic evidence and some aspects of Arsacid political ideology". Notae Numismaticae. 2: 27–61.
- Olbrycht, Marek Jan (2016). "The Sacral Kingship of the early Arsacids. I. Fire Cult and Kingly Glory". Anabasis: Studia Classica et Orientalia. 7: 91–106.
- Rezakhani, Khodadad (2013). "Arsacid, Elymaean, and Persid Coinage". In Potts, Daniel T. (ed.). The Oxford Handbook of Ancient Iran. Oxford University Press. ISBN 978-0199733309.

Vologases III of Parthia Arsacid dynasty Died: 147
Regnal titles
Preceded by Pacorus II (predecessor); Osroes I (rival king); Mithridates V (rival king)	King of the Parthian Empire; 110–147	Succeeded by Vologases IV
