= Vologases IV =

King of Kings of the Parthian Empire from 147 to 191

Vologases IV 𐭅𐭋𐭂𐭔
- King of Kings
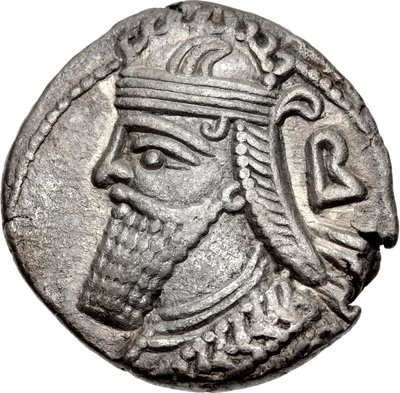
- Vologases IV's portrait on the obverse of a tetradrachm, showing him wearing a beard and a tiara on his head

King of the Parthian Empire
- Reign: 147–191
- Predecessor: Vologases III
- Successor: Vologases V
- Rival king: Osroes II (190)
- Died: 191
- Issue: Pacorus; Vologases V
- Dynasty: Arsacid dynasty
- Father: Mithridates V
- Religion: Zoroastrianism

Vologases IV (Parthian: 𐭅𐭋𐭂𐭔 Walagash) was King of Kings of the Parthian Empire from 147 to 191. He was the son of Mithridates V (r. 129–140). Vologases spent the early years of his reign re-asserting Parthian control over the Kingdom of Characene. From 161 to 166, he waged war against the Roman Empire; although initially successful, conquering Armenia and Syria, he was eventually pushed back, briefly losing control of the Parthian capitals of Seleucia and Ctesiphon to the Romans. The Romans suffered heavy losses from a plague erupting from Seleucia in 166, forcing them to withdraw. The war ended soon afterward, with Vologases losing most of northern Mesopotamia to the Romans. He died in 191 and was succeeded by his son Vologases V.

== Name ==
Vologases is the Greek and Latin form of the Parthian Walagaš (𐭅𐭋𐭂𐭔). The name is also attested in New Persian as Balāsh and Middle Persian as Wardākhsh (also spelled Walākhsh). The etymology of the name is unclear, although Ferdinand Justi proposes that Walagaš, the first form of the name, is a compound of words "strength" (varəda), and "handsome" (gaš or geš in Modern Persian).

== Reign ==
=== Conquest of Characene ===
Vologases IV was a son of Mithridates V, who had contended against the ruling Parthian monarch Vologases III (r. 110–147) for the throne from 129 to 140. Vologases IV staged a coup d'état and succeeded Vologases III in 147, marking the establishment of a new branch of the Arsacid dynasty on the Parthian throne. In 150/51, he defeated the Arsacid ruler of Characene (also known as Mesene), Meredates, and appointed Orabazes II, most likely a relative of his, as the new king of Characene. Vologases IV's forces seized a statue of Heracles, the patron god of the Characenian royalty. The statue was taken to the temple of Apollo in Seleucia, where it was displayed as a demonstration of Vologases IV's victory. A bilingual inscription (Greek and Parthian) was carved on the statue, which recounts Vologases IV's conquest of Characene:

"In the year of the Greeks 462 (151 AD) the King of Kings Arsaces Vologases, son of Mithridates king, led a military expedition into Mesene against Mithridates king, son of previous ruler Pacorus, and after king Mithridates had been expelled from Mesene, became the ruler of all of Mesene and of this bronze statue of the god Heracles, which he himself transported from Mesene, placed in this Sanctuary of the god Apollo who guards the Bronze Door."

=== War with the Romans ===
When Marcus Aurelius became the new Roman emperor in 161, Vologases IV unexpectedly declared war against the Romans, marking the only time in a Roman-Parthian conflict where the Parthians declared war. Vologases IV invaded Armenia and replaced its Roman client king Sohaemus with his own son Pacorus.

At the same time, an unanticipated Parthian invasion of Syria led to the defeat of the Roman soldiers assigned there. Confident, Vologases IV declined an offer for peace by the Romans in 162. Although the Roman–Parthian War of 161–166 started auspiciously for the Parthians, after the Romans recovered from the first shock and setbacks, they counterattacked, restored Sohaemus to the Armenian throne in 163. Around the same time, the Parthians captured Edessa and installed Wa'el as puppet king. Ma'nu VIII, the legitimate king, was forced to flee to the Roman Empire. The Parthian forces were pushed out of Syria, in 164, and also lost Dura-Europos, which led many Parthian vassal rulers to desert Vologases IV. The Romans laid siege to Edessa in 165; during the siege, the citizens of the city massacred the Parthian garrison and opened its gates to the Romans. The Romans entered the city and restored Ma'nu VIII as ruler of Edessa/Osroene; he also received the epithet Philorhomaios ("Friend of the Romans").

The Parthian capitals of Seleucia and Ctesiphon were captured by the Roman general Avidius Cassius in 165 or 166. Most likely around the same time, Roman legions invaded Media and Adiabene. However, the Romans suffered heavy losses from a plague erupting from Seleucia in 166, forcing them to withdraw. The war ended soon afterward, with Vologases IV losing most of northern Mesopotamia to the Romans.

=== Later reign ===
The chronicles do not report unrest or rebellions following the Parthian defeat, which the modern historian Michael Sommer refers to as a "disastrous military setback." This likely indicates that Vologases IV had managed to maintain political stability. The Parthian loss of most of northern Mesopotamia meant that the city of Hatra had now become their new frontier in the west. Hatra was ruled by Parthian vassals who wielded the title of malka (lord). However, due to its now higher strategic importance, Vologases IV elevated the titulature of the ruling Hatran family to that of king, and also allowed them certain ceremonies and traditional ritual oaths. After Sohaemus' death in 180, Vologases IV's son managed to gain the Armenian throne as Vologases II (r. 180–191).

The end of Vologases IV's reign was marred by the revolt of Osroes II in 190, who minted coins of himself at Ecbatana in Media. However, Vologases IV's son, Vologases V, succeeded him, and appears to have quickly put down Osroes II, ascending the throne as Vologases V.

== Coinage ==
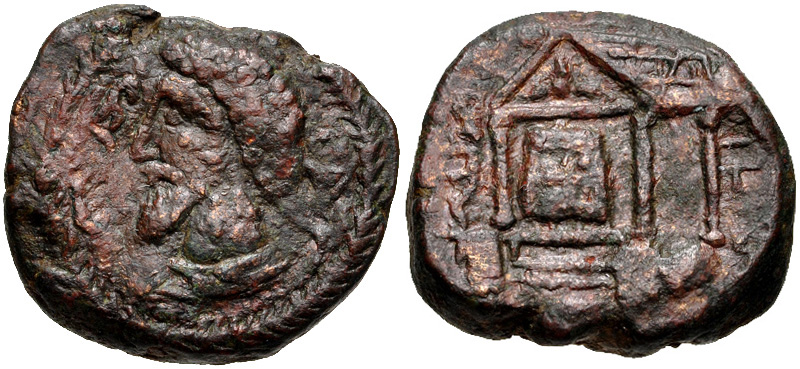
Coin of Wa'el, with the obverse portraying Vologases IV

On the obverse of his tetradrachms, Vologases IV is portrayed with a domed tiara with a horn on the side. He is also wearing a neck flap covering both of his ears. On the obverse of his drachms, Vologases IV is wearing a tiara without the horn. Vologases IV is the first Parthian monarch to only wear a tiara on his coins. On some of the reverse of Vologases IV's bronze coins, an eagle is depicted, which is associated with the khvarenah, i.e. kingly glory. On the obverse of the coins of the brief ruler of Edessa/Osroene, Wa'el, a portrait of Vologases IV is displayed.

== Sources ==
- Bivar, A.D.H. (1983). "The Political History of Iran Under the Arsacids". In Yarshater, Ehsan (ed.). The Cambridge History of Iran: The Seleucid, Parthian and Sasanian Periods. Vol. 3(1). Cambridge: Cambridge University Press. pp. 21–99. ISBN 0-521-20092-X.
- Chaumont, M. L.; Schippmann, K. (1988). "Balāš". Encyclopaedia Iranica, Vol. III, Fasc. 6. pp. 574–580.
- Curtis, Vesta Sarkhosh (2012). "Parthian coins: Kingship and Divine Glory". The Parthian Empire and its Religions. Computus Druck Satz & Verlag. pp. 67–83. ISBN 9783940598134.
- Dąbrowa, Edward (2010). "The Arsacids and their State". Altertum und Gegenwart. XI: 21–52.
- Dąbrowa, Edward (2012). "The Arsacid Empire". In Daryaee, Touraj (ed.). The Oxford Handbook of Iranian History. Oxford University Press. pp. 1–432. ISBN 978-0-19-987575-7. Archived from the original on 2019-01-01.
- de Jong, Albert (2013). "Hatra and the Parthian Commonwealth". In Dirven, Lucinda (ed.). Hatra: Politics, Culture and Religion Between Parthia and Rome. Franz Steiner Verlag. pp. 143–161. ISBN 978-3515104128.
- Drijvers, H. J. W. (1980). Cults and Beliefs at Edessa. Brill. ISBN 978-9004060500.
- Gregoratti, Leonardo (2013a). "Epigraphy of Later Parthia". Voprosy Epigrafiki: Sbornik statei: 276–284. Archived from the original on 2020-07-13.
- Gregoratti, Leonardo (2013b). "Hatra: on the West of the East". In Dirven, Lucinda (ed.). Hatra: Politics, Culture and Religion Between Parthia and Rome. Franz Steiner Verlag. pp. 45–57. ISBN 978-3515104128. Archived from the original on 2022-11-05.
- Gregoratti, Leonardo (2017). "The Arsacid Empire". In Daryaee, Touraj (ed.). King of the Seven Climes: A History of the Ancient Iranian World (3000 BCE - 651 CE). UCI Jordan Center for Persian Studies. pp. 1–236. ISBN 9780692864401. Archived from the original on 2021-12-06.
- Kia, Mehrdad (2016). The Persian Empire: A Historical Encyclopedia. ABC-CLIO. ISBN 978-1610693912. (2 volumes)
- Olbrycht, Marek Jan (1997). "Parthian King's tiara - Numismatic evidence and some aspects of Arsacid political ideology". Notae Numismaticae. 2: 27–61.
- Russell, James R. (1987). Zoroastrianism in Armenia. Harvard University Press. ISBN 978-0674968509.
- Sartre, Maurice (2005). Porter, Catherine; Rawlings, Elizabeth (eds.). The Middle East Under Rome. Harvard University Press. ISBN 978-0674016835.
- Segal, J.B. (1982). "ABGAR". Encyclopaedia Iranica, Vol. I, Fasc. 2. pp. 210–213.
- Sellwood, David (1983). "Parthian Coins". In Yarshater, Ehsan (ed.). The Cambridge History of Iran: The Seleucid, Parthian and Sasanian Periods. Vol. 3(1). Cambridge: Cambridge University Press. pp. 279–298. ISBN 0-521-20092-X.
- Sommer, Michael (2013). "In the twilight. Hatra between Rome and Iran". In Dirven, Lucinda (ed.). Hatra: Politics, Culture and Religion Between Parthia and Rome. Franz Steiner Verlag. pp. 33–45. ISBN 978-3515104128.
- Toumanoff, C. (1986). "Arsacids vii. The Arsacid dynasty of Armenia". Encyclopaedia Iranica, Vol. II, Fasc. 5. pp. 543–546.

Vologases IV Arsacid dynasty Died: 191
Regnal titles
Preceded by Vologases III	King of the Parthian Empire; 147–191	Succeeded by Osroes II (rival king); Vologases V (successor)
