= Mithridates V of Parthia =

Parthian contender for the throne from 129 to 140

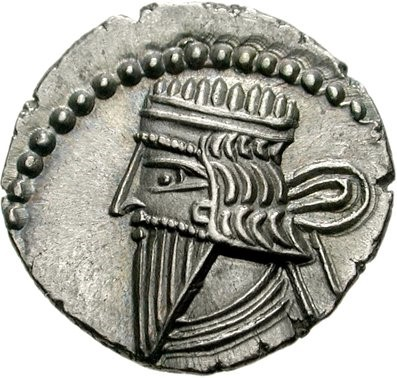
Coin of Mithridates V, Ecbatana mint

Mithridates V (Parthian: 𐭌𐭄𐭓𐭃𐭕 Mihrdāt) was a Parthian contender from 129 to 140. Sources claim he was either a son of Pacorus II or a brother of Osroes I. His son, Vologases IV of Parthia (147–191), took the throne after the death of Vologases III in 147.

He died in 140 during a battle in Commagene against the Romans.

== Sources ==
- Dąbrowa, Edward (2012). "The Arsacid Empire". In Daryaee, Touraj (ed.). The Oxford Handbook of Iranian History. Oxford University Press. pp. 1–432. ISBN 978-0-19-987575-7. Archived from the original on 2019-01-01.
- Kia, Mehrdad (2016). The Persian Empire: A Historical Encyclopedia. ABC-CLIO. ISBN 978-1610693912. (2 volumes)

Mithridates V of Parthia Arsacid dynasty
Preceded by Vologases III	King of the Parthian Empire; 129–140	Succeeded by Vologases IV
