= Siege of Edessa (1031) =

1031 siege of Edessa

- Part of the Byzantine–Arab wars
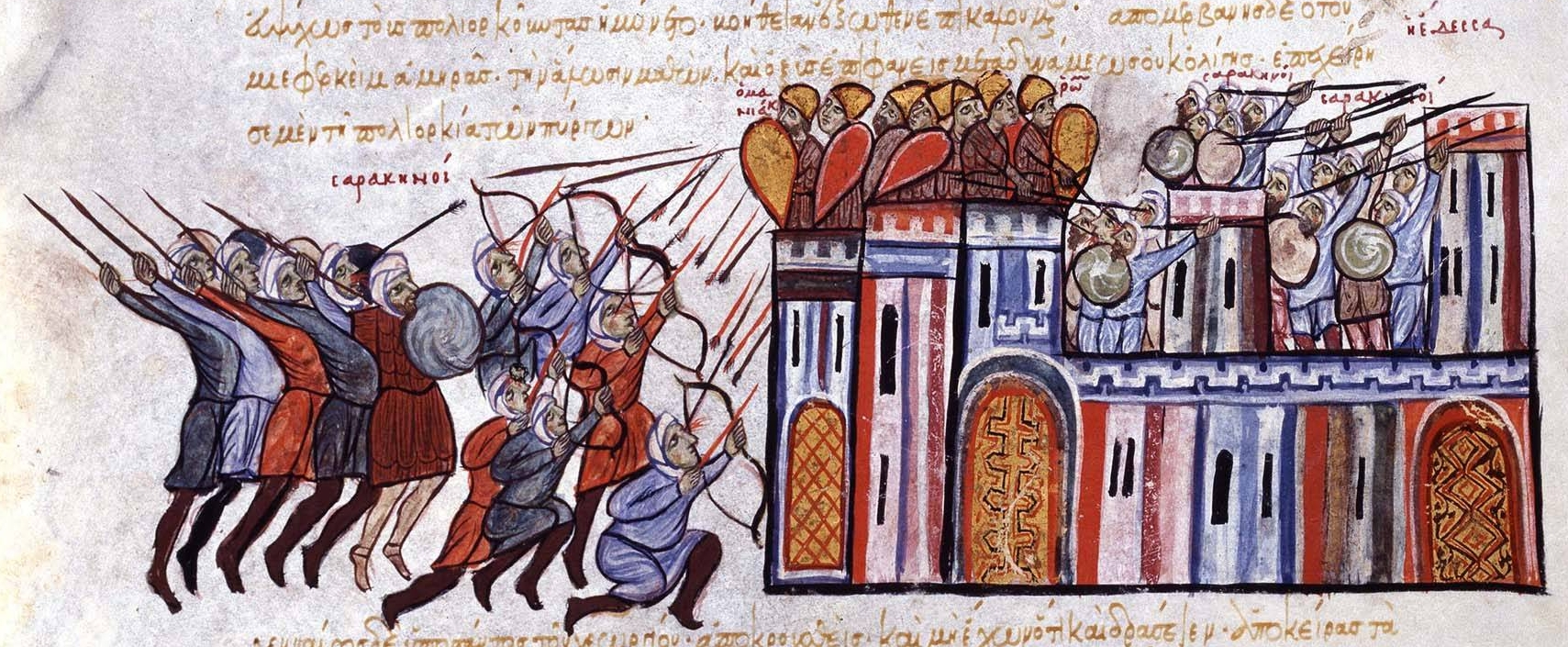
- The seizure of Edessa in Syria by the Byzantine army
Date	1031
Location	Edessa (modern-day Şanlıurfa, Turkey)
Result	Byzantine victory

Belligerents
Byzantine Empire	Marwanid dynasty

Commanders and leaders
George Maniakes	Emir Apomervanis

The Siege of Edessa (1031) was a siege by the Byzantine Empire, led by the general George Maniakes, against the Muslim garrison of Edessa and a relief army from the Marwanid Emirate of Martyropolis. The operation resulted in a Byzantine victory, and the permanent re-incorporation of the city into the Byzantine Empire.

== Background ==
In the spring of 1031, the Kilabite emir Ibn Shibl of Edessa died without male heirs under tumultuous circumstances. At the time, the city was contested by two local potentates: Ibn Shibl, who was a vassal of Abu Nasr Ahmad Nasr al-Dawla ibn Marwan (the powerful Marwanid emir of Martyropolis), and Uthayr (Outair), the chief of the powerful nomadic Banu Numayr tribe. Uthayr, acting as a traditional Bedouin shaykh, rarely visited the city and governed through a deputy named Ahmad ibn Muhammad. Following Uthayr's execution of his deputy, he incurred the bitter hostility of Edessa's inhabitants, creating the internal instability that set the stage for Byzantine intervention.

The Byzantine general George Maniakes first achieved prominence following the defeat of Emperor Romanos III Argyros by the Arabs at the Battle of Azaz in August 1030. At the time, Maniakes served as the strategos (governor) of the border fortress of Teluch. Following their victory at Azaz, a detachment of 800 Arab troops appeared outside Teluch and demanded the city's surrender. Pretending to comply, Maniakes feigned willingness to capitulate and sent food and wine to the Arab encampment the next evening. Once the opposing forces were intoxicated and asleep, Maniakes led a night attack that destroyed the detachment. He subsequently dispatched 280 camels loaded with captured booty, alongside the ears and noses of the fallen Arab soldiers, to Emperor Romanos III in Cappadocia. In recognition of this success, Romanos III appointed Maniakes as catepan of Lower Media, based in Samosata.

== Battle ==
In the autumn of 1031, Maniakes launched an operation to recover the strategically vital city of Edessa, which had been under Arab control since its conquest in 638. The city's commander, named Suleiman, had been appointed by Apomervanis, the Marwanid emir of Martyropolis. Maniakes negotiated with Suleiman, offering gifts, promises of high office, and bribes to secure the surrender of the fortifications. During the night, Suleiman opened a gate, allowing Maniakes and a small contingent of Byzantine troops to enter and seize three of the city’s strongest fortification towers. Upon discovering the Byzantine presence, the local garrison launched counterattacks against the occupied towers. Shortly thereafter, Apomervanis arrived from Martyropolis with a large relief army to assault the Byzantine positions. Maniakes and his men repulsed every assault and maintained control over the towers. Unable to dislodge the Byzantines from the fortifications, the retreating forces destroyed several major municipal structures and set fire to the city, including its main Christian church. Loading their plunder onto camels, the besiegers withdrew to Martyropolis. Following their retreat, Maniakes secured the city's acropolis, summoned imperial reinforcements, and established Byzantine control over Edessa. During the consolidation of the city, Byzantine forces recovered a revered Christian relic: an apocryphal letter attributed to Jesus Christ to King Abgar of Edessa. The relic was subsequently transferred to Constantinople, significantly enhancing Maniakes' public standing within the empire.

== Aftermath ==
Following the capture of Edessa, Maniakes was designated as the regional governor. Lead seals from this period record his titles as protospatharios and strategos of the Euphrates cities (πρωτοσπαθάριος, στρατηγὸς τῶν παρευφρατιδίων πόλεων). He was later elevated to patrikios and archegetes of the East (ἀρχηγέτης τῆς Ἀνατολῆς), serving as commander of the field infantry. Maniakes governed Edessa from 1031 until between 1034 and 1035, when he was succeeded by Leon Lependrenos before being reassigned to Vaspurakan.

Under Byzantine rule, Edessa remained an important centre for the production of textiles and was quite prosperous as indicated by the city's tax revenue, which was 50 pounds of gold per year. In the years 1071-1072, the city's population was around 35,000 residents, of whom 20,000 were Syrians, 8,000 were Armenians, 6,000 were Greeks and 1,000 were Latins.

The city faced subsequent Arab assaults in 1036 and 1038 but remained under Byzantine control for over five decades. Following the Battle of Manzikert in 1071, Edessa was initially included in the peace terms negotiated between Sultan Alp Arslan and Emperor Romanos IV Diogenes, though Byzantine forces retained control of the city until it fell to the Seljuk Sultan Malik-Shah in 1086. In 1097, during the First Crusade, the city came under the control of Baldwin of Boulogne, who established the County of Edessa as the first Crusader state.
