= Osroes II =

Claimant to Parthian throne (c.190)

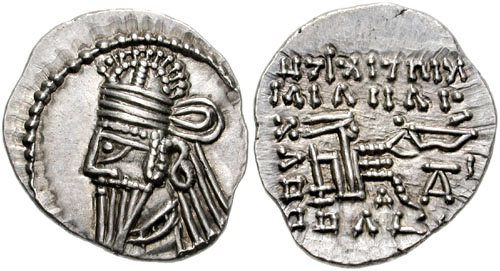
- Coin of Osroes II, Ecbatana mint

Rival Parthian king
- Reign: 190
- Predecessor: Vologases IV
- Successor: Vologases V
- Dynasty: Arsacid dynasty
- Religion: Zoroastrianism

Osroes II (also spelled Chosroes II or Khosrow II; Parthian: 𐭇𐭅𐭎𐭓𐭅 Husrōw), was a claimant of the throne of the Parthian Empire c. 190. He is unknown to history except for the coins he issued. The date of his reign suggests that he rebelled against Vologases IV but was unable to maintain himself against Vologases V. His coins were issued by the mint at Ecbatana, suggesting that he controlled Media.

== Sources ==
- Sellwood, David (1968). "Parthian Coins". In Fischer, William B. (ed.). The Cambridge History of Iran. Vol. 3a. Cambridge: Cambridge University Press. pp. 279–298. ISBN 0-521-06935-1.

Osroes II Arsacid dynasty
Preceded by Vologases IV	King of the Parthian Empire; 190	Succeeded by Vologases V
