= Siege of Edessa (163) =

Siege by Parthians of Roman held city (163)

Siege to Edessa
- Part of the Roman–Parthian War of 161–166
Date	163
Location	Edessa, Osroene (modern-day Şanlıurfa, Turkey)
Result	Parthian victory

Belligerents
Roman Empire	Parthian Empire

Commanders and leaders
Lucius Verus	Vologases IV

The siege of Edessa took place in 163 when the Parthian Empire, under Vologases IV, besieged the city of Edessa, held by the Roman Empire.

The Parthians captured Edessa and installed Wa'el (son of Sahru) as puppet king. Ma'nu VIII (son of Ma'nu VII), the legitimate king, was forced to flee to the Romans.

Wa'el would rule Edessa/Osroene as a Parthian subject from 163 to 165, when the Romans regained possession of the city and reinstalled Ma'nu VIII on the throne. During his short tenure, Wa'el issued coins with the portrait of the Parthian king.

== Sources ==
- Drijvers, H. J. W. (1980). Cults and Beliefs at Edessa. Brill. ISBN 978-9004060500.
- Sartre, Maurice (2005). Porter, Catherine; Rawlings, Elizabeth (eds.). The Middle East Under Rome. Harvard University Press. ISBN 978-0674016835.
- Segal, J.B. (1982). "ABGAR". Encyclopaedia Iranica, Vol. I, Fasc. 2. pp. 210–213.
