= Marwanids =

Marwanids may refer to:

- The Marwanid dynasty, a branch of the Umayyad dynasty, which ruled as caliphs from 684 to 750
- Marwanids (Diyar Bakr), a Kurdish dynasty that ruled in Diyar Bakr in the 10th–11th centuries
