= Kanishka's war with Parthia =

2nd-century war in Northwest Kushan region

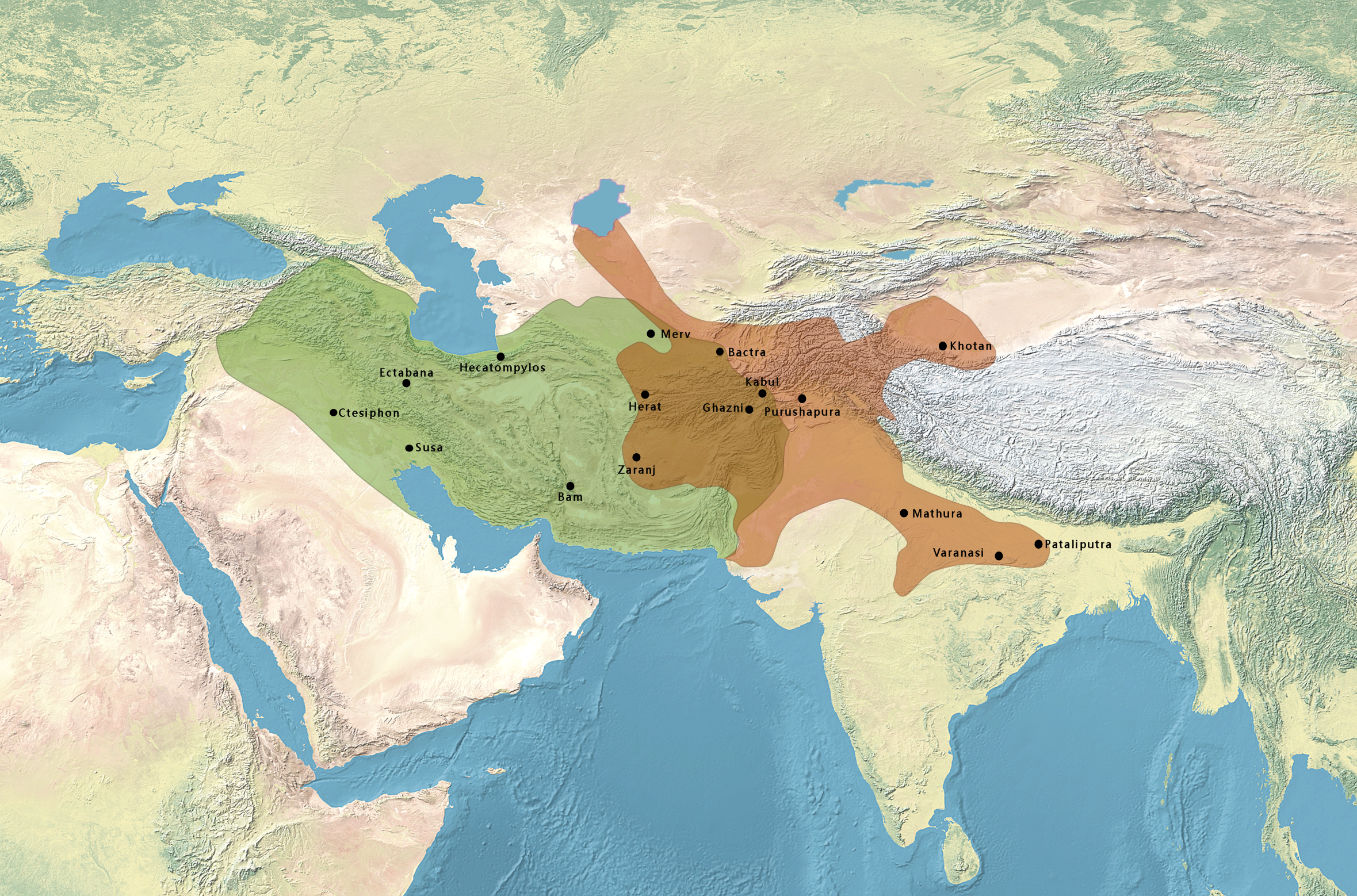
- The Parthian Empire ( ) with the Kushan Empire ( ) and zones of territorial contention.
Date	Possibly between c. 130 CE to c. 140 CE
Location	Possibly west of Kushan territory
Result	Kushan victory

Belligerents
Kushan Empire	Parthian Empire

Commanders and leaders
Kanishka I	Vologases III

Casualties and losses
Unknown	Unknown

Kanishka's war with Parthia was a war that may have taken place between Kanishka I of the Kushan Empire and the Parthians. The king of Parthia is said to have attacked Kanishka I and been defeated in battle.

== Campaign ==
A Buddhist text translated into Chinese in 470 under the title Fu fazang yinyuan zhuan (付法藏因緣傳, A History of the Buddha's Successors) carried in the Historical Tales section of the Tripiṭaka as number 2058, is the solitary source attesting this conflict. It is possible that the Kushans fought an earlier war against Parthia in conjunction with Trajan's Parthian campaign in 115 CE.

The text recounts a war between Kanishka I and the Eastern Parthian King, not named in the original, but determined by later scholars to have been Vologases III. As the war commenced, the Parthian king attacked the Kushan Empire with an army consisting of mounted bowmen, armoured soldiers, archers on foot and spearmen. This seemingly took place around the middle of the 2nd century. The Parthians may have been seeking to reclaim lands previously conquered by the Kushans. Kanishka responded with a counteroffensive, ending in a brutal melee. The text records the patently inflated figure of 900,000 Parthian deaths, described as "slaughter". It is mentioned that both sides attacked each other incessantly in the battle until Kanishka won. This tale emphasises that Kanishka's actions were mitigated by the cruelty and stubbornness of the Parthian king.

== Aftermath ==
Kanishka was victorious but was shocked to see the sufferings that he had caused. He decided to repent and seek guidance from religious leaders.

After that Kanishka decided to launch the second expedition on China. The expedition turned out to be successful as the Chinese were defeated and Kanishka I annexed the provinces of Kashgar, Yarkhand, and Khotan from the Han Empire. His empire then stretched from Central Asia to central India including Gandhara, Kashmir, and the Pamir region.
