= Siege of Edessa (165) =

Siege of Parthian-held Edessa by Roman forces (165)

Roman–Parthian War of 161–166
- Part of the Roman–Parthian War of 161–166
Date	165
Location	Edessa, Osroene (modern-day Şanlıurfa, Turkey)
Result	Roman victory: Citizens of Edessa massacre its Parthian garrison and submit the city to the Romans

Belligerents
Roman Empire; Pro-Roman Edessans	Parthian Empire; Pro-Parthian Edessans

Commanders and leaders
Lucius Verus; Avidius Cassius; Ma'nu VIII, son of Ma'nu VII	Vologases IV; Wa'el, son of Sahru

The siege of Edessa took place in 165 when the Roman Empire, under Emperor Lucius Verus, besieged the city of Edessa, held by the Parthian Empire.

Wa'el (son of Sahru), then ruler of Edessa and Osroene, had been installed by the Parthians in 163 and issued coins with the portrait of the Parthian king. As a result, Ma'nu VIII (son of Ma'nu VII) was forced to flee to the Romans.

During the 165 siege, the citizens of Edessa massacred the Parthian garrison of Edessa and opened its gates to the Romans. The Romans entered the city and Ma'nu VIII was reinstated by the Romans as ruler of Edessa/Osroene; he also received the epithet Philorhomaios ("Friend of the Romans").

As a result of the 165 siege, Edessa/Osroene repudiated its allegiance to the Parthians, and resubmitted itself to the Romans.

== Sources ==
- Bivar, A.D.H. (1983). Yarshater, Ehsan (ed.). The Cambridge History of Iran, Volume 3: The Seleucid, Parthian and Sasanid Periods (part 1 of 2). Cambridge University Press. ISBN 978-0521200929.
- Drijvers, H. J. W. (1980). Cults and Beliefs at Edessa. Brill. ISBN 978-9004060500.
- Sartre, Maurice (2005). "The Arabs and the desert peoples". In Bowman, Alan K.; Garnsey, Peter; Cameron, Averil (eds.). The Cambridge Ancient History: Volume 12, The Crisis of Empire, AD 193-337. Cambridge University Press. ISBN 978-0521301992.
- Segal, J.B. (1982). "ABGAR". Encyclopaedia Iranica, Vol. I, Fasc. 2. pp. 210–213.
