= Kanishka =

Kushan emperor from 127 to 150

Kaniṣka, Kanishka
- King of Kings
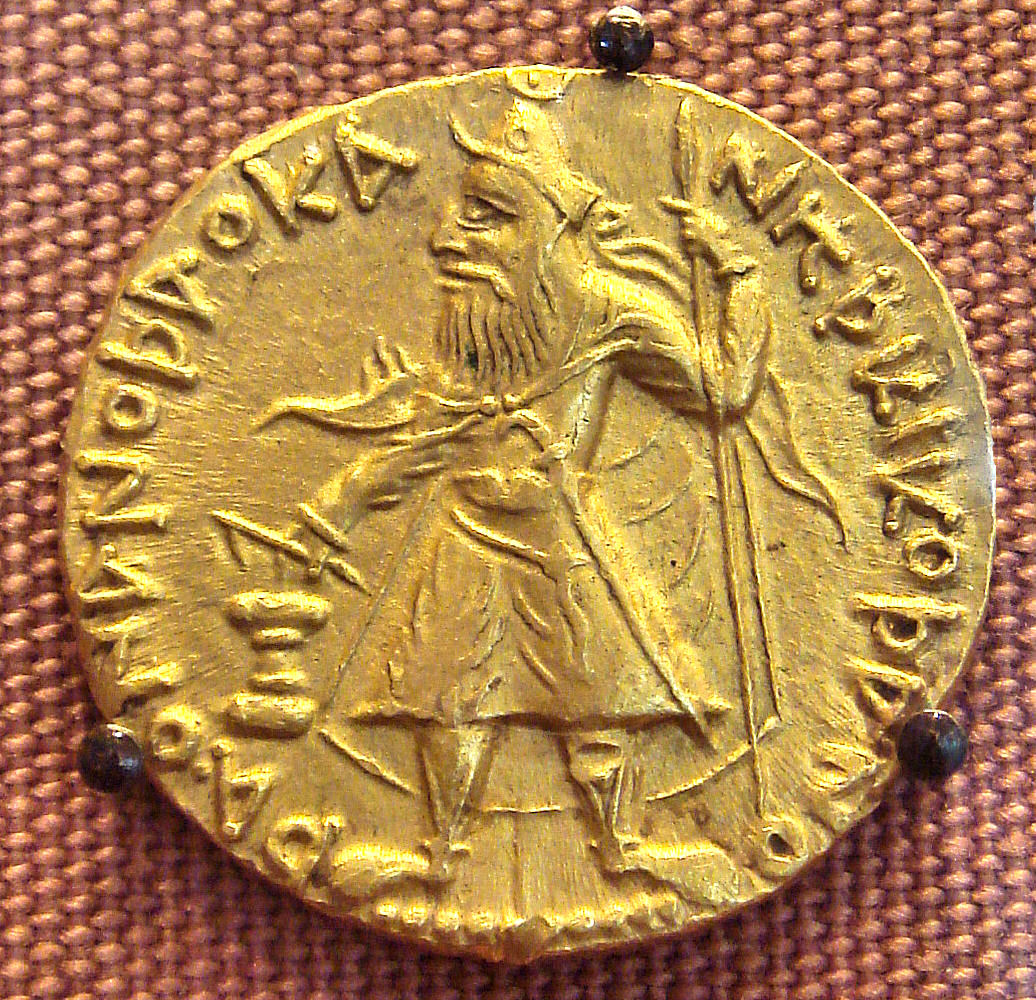
- Gold coin of Kanishka. Greco-Bactrian legend: ϷΑΟΝΑΝΟϷΑΟ ΚΑΝΗϷΚΙ ΚΟϷΑΝΟ; Shaonanoshao Kanishki Koshano "King of Kings, Kanishka the Kushan". British Museum.

Kushan emperor
- Reign: 127–150 CE
- Predecessor: Vima Kadphises
- Successor: Huvishka
- Born: Possibly Khotan, present-day Xinjiang, China (per Chinese chronicles) or Kashmir
- Dynasty: Kushan

Kanishka I, (Note: Sanskrit: कनिष्क, IAST: Kaniṣka; Bactrian: Κανηϸκε, Kanēške; Kharosthi: 𐨐𐨞𐨁𐨮𐨿𐨐 Ka-ṇi-ṣka; Brahmi: 𑀓𑀸𑀡𑀺𑀱𑁆𑀓 Kā-ṇi-ṣka) also known as Kanishka the Great, was an emperor of the Kushan dynasty, under whose reign (c. 127–150 CE) the empire reached its zenith. He is famous for his military, political, and spiritual achievements. A descendant of Kujula Kadphises, founder of the Kushan Empire, Kanishka came to rule an empire extending from Central Asia and Gandhara to Pataliputra in the Gangetic plains. The main capital of his empire was located at Puruṣapura (Peshawar) in Gandhara, with another major capital at Mathura. Coins of Kanishka were found at Tripuri (present-day Jabalpur).

Although he never converted to the religion, his conquests and patronage of Buddhism played an important role in the development of the Silk Road, and in the transmission of Mahayana Buddhism from Gandhara across the Karakoram range to China. Around 127 CE, he replaced Greek with Bactrian as the official language of administration in the empire.

Earlier scholars believed that Kanishka ascended the Kushan throne in 78 CE, and that this date was used as the beginning of the Saka calendar era. However, historians no longer regard this date as that of Kanishka's accession. Falk estimates that Kanishka came to the throne in 127 CE.

== Genealogy ==
Mathura statue of Kanishka

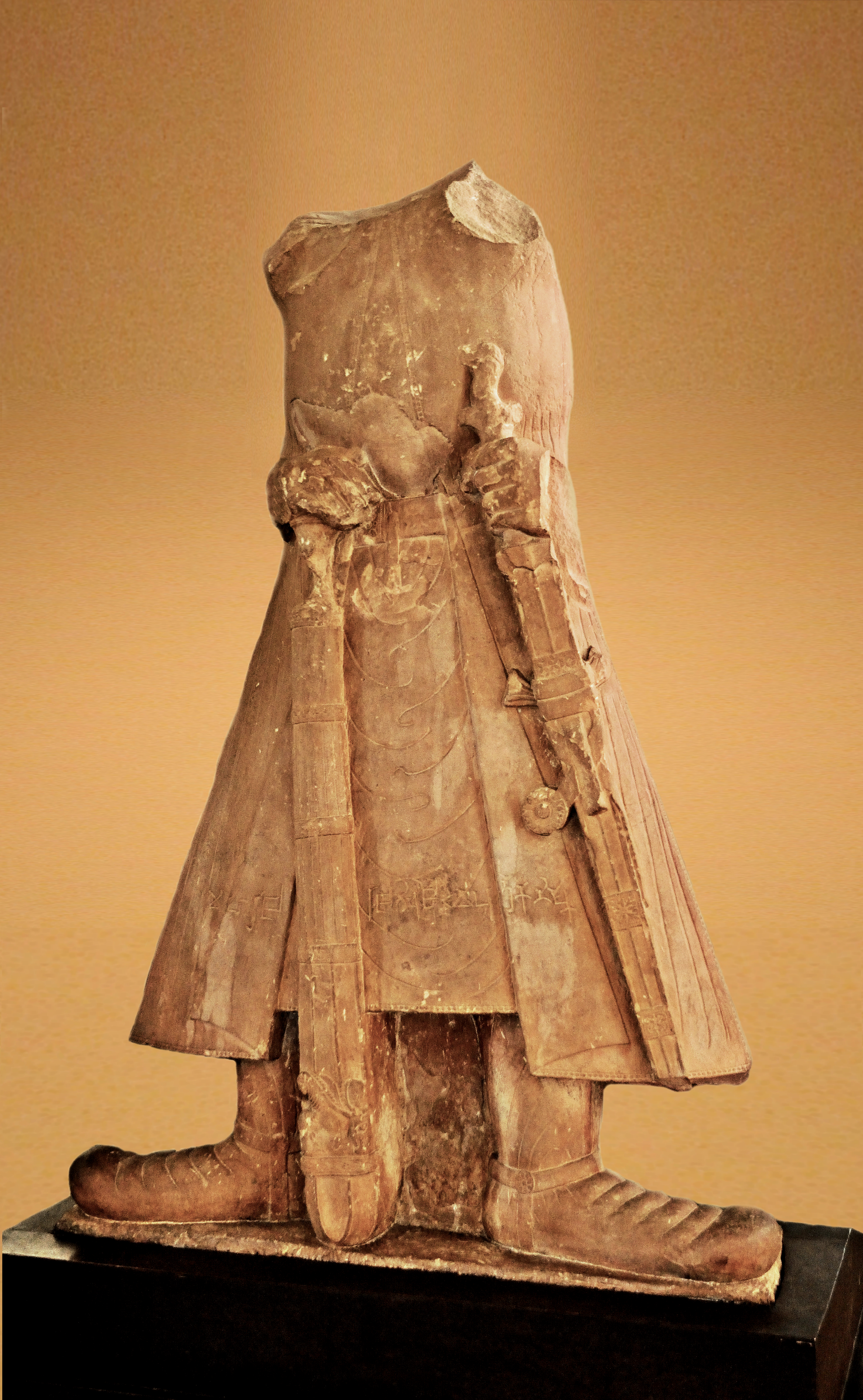
The Kanishka statue in the Mathura Museum.Founded from Mant, Mathura. There is a dedicatory inscription along the bottom of the coat.

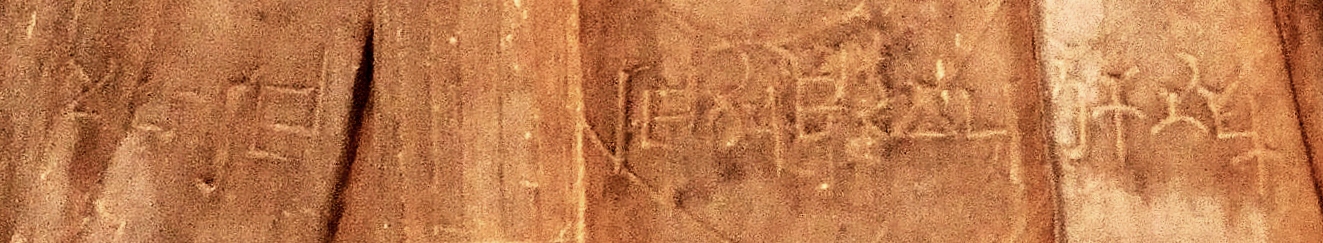
The inscription is in middle Brahmi script:

Mahārāja Rājadhirāja Devaputra Kāṇiṣka
"The Great King, King of Kings, Son of God, Kanishka".
Mathura art, Mathura Museum

There are two theories about Kanisha's origins, both based on the supposition of a separate Kanishka dynasty. The earlier Sten Konow's is that Kanishka came from Khotan, having been summoned as an ethnic ally at the time of troubles after Vima Kadphises's reign. Konow supports this theory by citing a Tibetan tradition that a Khotanese expedition to India of about A.D. 120 was commanded by a King Vijayakirti along with a King Kanika and the king of Guzan.

Roman Ghirshman's similar theory is that Kanishka was originally king of Kashmir before becoming suzerain of the dynasty as a whole. He cites the above-mentioned Khalatse epigraph, which may allude to Kushan power reaching the northeast corner of Kashmir, and also the Rajatarangini, in which the list of Kushan kings of Kashmir gave Kanishka's name as the third of a sequence, along with the names of Hushka and Jushka. Finally, testimony of Kanishka's activity in Kashmir in favor of the Buddhist faith suggests that he favored the region above others and that he founded Puruṣapura as his capital to be close to Kashmir.

He was of Yuezhi ethnicity and his native language was probably Tocharian. Kanishka was the successor of Vima Kadphises, as demonstrated by an impressive genealogy of the Kushan kings, known as the Rabatak inscription. The connection of Kanishka with other Kushan rulers is described in the Rabatak inscription as Kanishka makes the list of the kings who ruled up to his time: Kujula Kadphises as his great-grandfather, Vima Taktu as his grandfather, Vima Kadphises as his father, and himself Kanishka: "for King Kujula Kadphises (his) great grandfather, and for King Vima Taktu (his) grandfather, and for King Vima Kadphises (his) father, and *also for himself, King Kanishka".

== Conquests in India and Central Asia ==
Kanishka's empire was certainly vast. It extended from southern Uzbekistan and Tajikistan, north of the Amu Darya (Oxus) in the north west to Northern India, as far as Mathura in the south east (the Rabatak inscription even claims he held Pataliputra and Sri Champa), and his territory also included Kashmir, where there was a town Kanishkapur (modern day Kanispora), named after him not far from the Baramulla Pass and which still contains the base of a large stupa. The Buddhist text Śrīdharmapiṭakanidānasūtra—known via a Chinese translation made in AD 472—refers to the conquest of Pataliputra by Kanishka.

Knowledge of his hold over Central Asia is less well established. The Hou Hanshu, states that general Ban Chao fought battles near Khotan with a Kushan army of 70,000 men led by an otherwise unknown Kushan viceroy named Xie (Chinese: 謝) in 90 AD. Ban Chao claimed to be victorious, forcing the Kushans to retreat by use of a scorched-earth policy. The territories of Kashgar, Khotan and Yarkand were Chinese dependencies in the Tarim Basin, modern Xinjiang. Several coins of Kanishka have been found in the Tarim Basin.

Kanishka possibly fought off an invasion by the Parthian Empire in his reign. The war is attested in a single source, a Chinese translation of a lost Sanskrit original, A History of the Buddha's Successors.

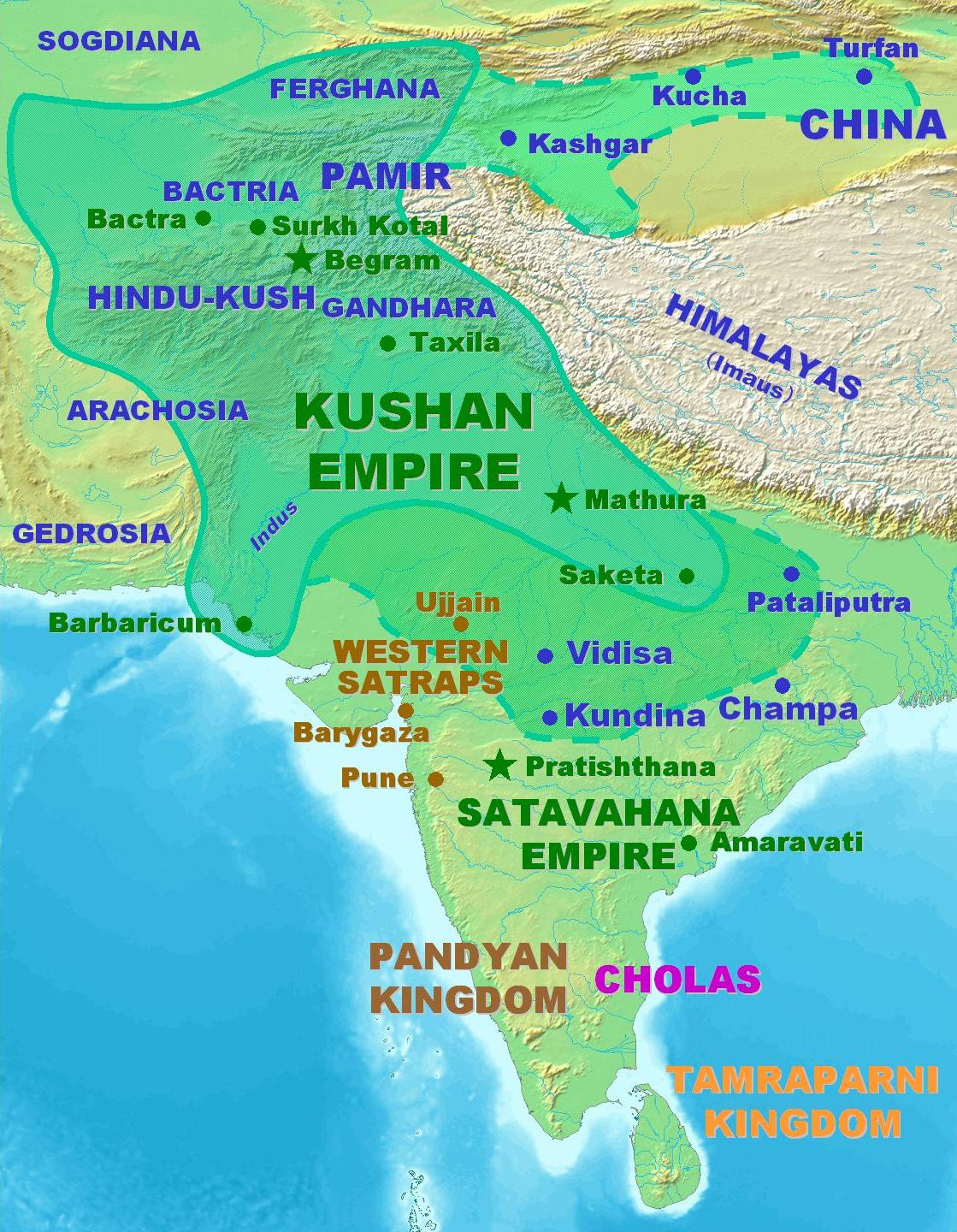
Kushan territories (full line) and maximum extent of Kushan dominions under Kanishka (dotted line). The conquests in India are according to the Rabatak inscription, the northern expansion into the Tarim Basin is mainly suggested by coin finds and Chinese chronicles.

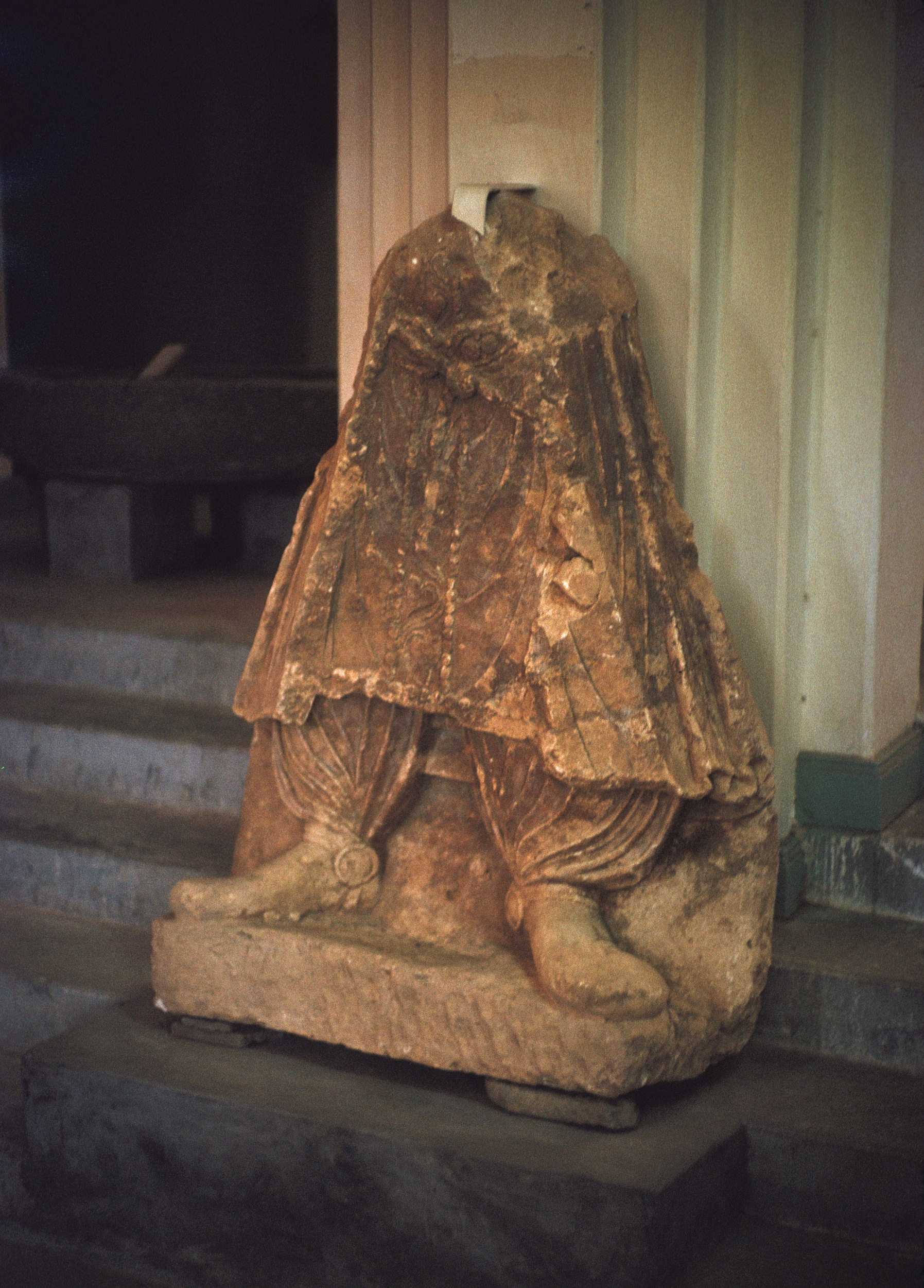
Probable statue of Kanishka, Surkh Kotal, 2nd century CE. Kabul Museum.

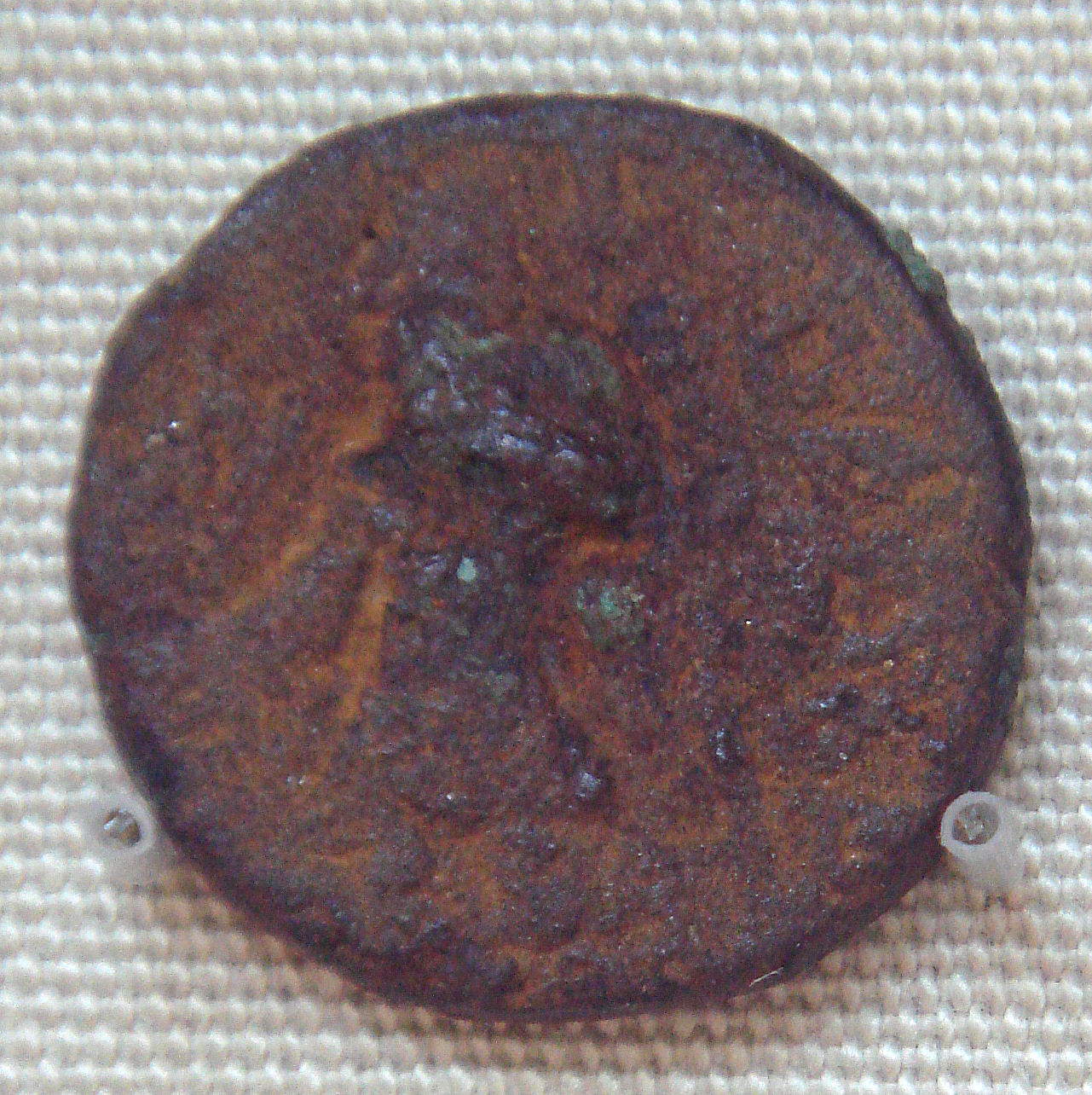
Bronze coin of Kanishka, found in Khotan, modern China.

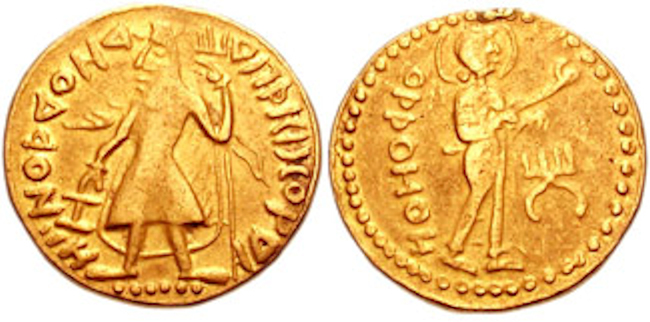
Samatata coinage of king Vira Jadamarah, in imitation of the Kushan coinage of Kanishka I. Bengal, c. 2nd–3rd century CE.

== Kanishka's coins ==
Kanishka's coins portray images of Indian, Greek, Iranian and even Sumero-Elamite divinities, demonstrating the religious syncretism in his beliefs. Kanishka's coins from the beginning of his reign bear legends in Greek language and script and depict Greek divinities. Later coins bear legends in Bactrian, the Iranian language that the Kushans evidently spoke, and Greek divinities were replaced by corresponding Iranian ones. All of Kanishka's coins – even ones with a legend in the Bactrian language – were written in a modified Greek script that had one additional glyph (Ϸ) to represent /š/ (sh), as in the word 'Kushan' and 'Kanishka'.

On his coins, the king is typically depicted as a bearded man in a long coat and trousers gathered at the ankle, with flames emanating from his shoulders. He wears large rounded boots, and is armed with a long sword as well as a lance. He is frequently seen to be making a sacrifice on a small altar. The lower half of a lifesize limestone relief of Kanishka similarly attired, with a stiff embroidered surplice beneath his coat and spurs attached to his boots under the light gathered folds of his trousers, survived in the Kabul Museum until it was destroyed by the Taliban.

=== Hellenistic phase ===
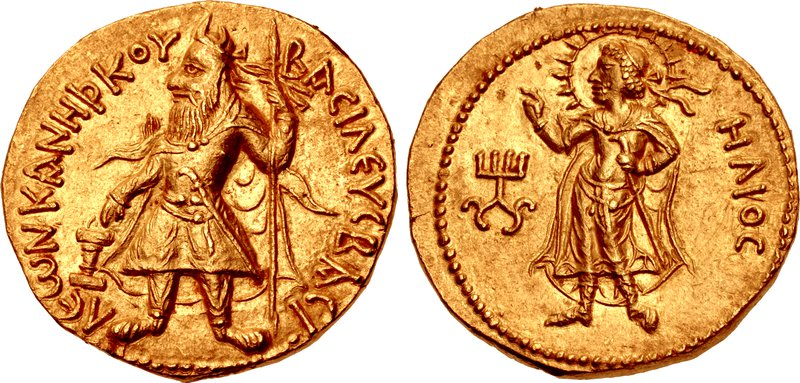
Gold coin of Kanishka I with Greek legend and Hellenistic divinity Helios. (c. 120 AD). Obverse: Kanishka standing, clad in heavy Kushan coat and long boots, flames emanating from shoulders, holding a standard in his left hand, and making a sacrifice over an altar. Greek legend ΒΑΣΙΛΕΥΣ ΒΑΣΙΛΕΩΝ ΚΑΝΗϷΚΟΥ "[coin] of Kanishka, king of kings". Reverse: Standing Helios in Hellenistic style, forming a benediction gesture with the right hand. Legend in Greek script: ΗΛΙΟΣ Helios. Kanishka monogram (tamgha) to the left.

A few coins at the beginning of his reign have a legend in the Greek language and script: ΒΑΣΙΛΕΥΣ ΒΑΣΙΛΕΩΝ ΚΑΝΗϷΚΟΥ, basileus basileon kaneshkou "[coin] of Kanishka, king of kings."
Greek deities, with Greek names are represented on these early coins:

- ΗΛΙΟΣ (ēlios, Hēlios), ΗΦΑΗΣΤΟΣ (ēphaēstos, Hephaistos), ΣΑΛΗΝΗ (salēnē, Selene), ΑΝΗΜΟΣ (anēmos, Anemos)

The inscriptions in Greek are full of spelling and syntactical errors.

=== Iranian / Indic phase ===
Following the transition to the Bactrian language on coins, Iranian and Indic divinities replace the Greek ones:

- ΑΡΔΟΧϷΟ (ardoxsho, Ashi Vanghuhi)
- ΛΡΟΟΑΣΠΟ (lrooaspo, Drvaspa)
- ΑΘϷΟ (adsho, Atar)
- ΦΑΡΡΟ (pharro, personified khwarenah)
- ΜΑΟ (mao, Mah)
- ΜΙΘΡΟ, ΜΙΙΡΟ, ΜΙΟΡΟ, ΜΙΥΡΟ (mithro, miiro, mioro, miuro, variants of Mithra)
- ΜΟΖΔΟΟΑΝΟ (mozdaooano, "Mazda the victorious?")
- ΝΑΝΑ, ΝΑΝΑΙΑ, ΝΑΝΑϷΑΟ (variants of pan-Asiatic Nana, Sogdian nny, in a Zoroastrian context Aredvi Sura Anahita)
- ΜΑΝΑΟΒΑΓΟ (manaobago, Vohu Manah )
- ΟΑΔΟ (oado, Vata)
- ΟΡΑΛΑΓΝΟ (orlagno, Verethragna)

Only a few Buddhist divinities were used as well:

- ΒΟΔΔΟ (boddo, Buddha),
- ϷΑΚΑΜΑΝΟ ΒΟΔΔΟ (shakamano boddho, Shakyamuni Buddha)
- ΜΕΤΡΑΓΟ ΒΟΔΔΟ (metrago boddo, the bodhisattava Maitreya)

Only a few Hindu divinities were used as well:

- ΟΗϷΟ (oesho, Shiva). A recent study indicate that oesho may be Avestan Vayu conflated with Shiva.

== Kanishka and Buddhism ==
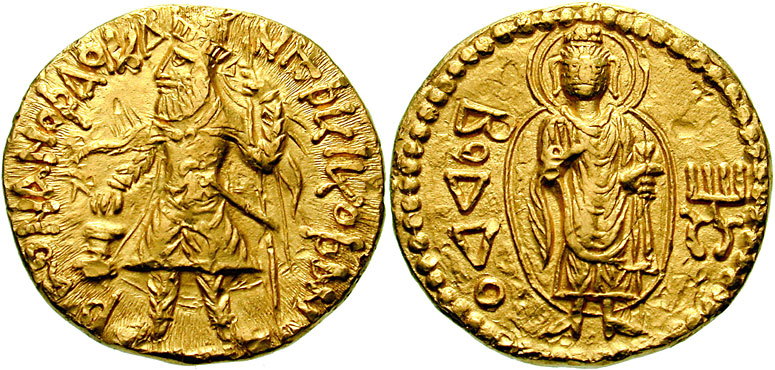
Gold coin of Kanishka I with a representation of the Buddha (c. 120 AD). Obv: Kanishka standing.., clad in heavy Kushan coat and long boots, flames emanating from shoulders, holding standard in his left hand, and making a sacrifice over an altar. Kushan-language legend in Greek script (with the addition of the Kushan Ϸ "sh" letter): ϷΑΟΝΑΝΟϷΑΟ ΚΑΝΗϷΚΙ ΚΟϷΑΝΟ ("Shaonanoshao Kanishki Koshano"): "King of Kings, Kanishka the Kushan". Rev: Standing Buddha in Hellenistic style, forming the gesture of "no fear" (abhaya mudra) with his right hand, and holding a pleat of his robe in his left hand. Legend in Greek script: ΒΟΔΔΟ "Boddo", for the Buddha. Kanishka monogram (tamgha) to the right.

In Buddhist tradition Kanishka is regarded as of utmost importance. Although he never converted to Buddhism, he encouraged its teachings and provided royal sponsorship. Notably, he administered the 4th Buddhist Council in Kashmir as the head of the council. It was presided by Vasumitra and Ashwaghosha. Images of the Buddha based on 32 physical signs were made during his time.

He encouraged both the Gandhara school of Greco-Buddhist art and the Mathura art (an inescapable religious syncretism pervades Kushana rule). Kanishka personally seems to have embraced both Buddhism and the Persian attributes but he favored Buddhism, proven by his devotion to Buddhist teachings and prayer styles depicted in various books related to kushan empire.

His greatest contribution to Buddhist architecture was the Kanishka Stupa at Puruṣapura, modern day Peshawar. Archaeologists who rediscovered the base of it in 1908–1909 estimated that this stupa had a diameter of 286 feet (87 metres). Reports of Chinese pilgrims such as Xuanzang indicate that its height was 600 to 700 (Chinese) "feet" (= roughly 180–210 metres or 591–689 ft.) and it was covered with jewels.

Kanishka is said to have been particularly close to the Buddhist scholar Ashvaghosha, who became his religious advisor in his later years.

=== Buddhist coinage ===
The Buddhist coins of Kanishka are comparatively rare (well under one percent of all known coins of Kanishka). Several show Kanishka on the obverse and the Buddha standing on the reverse. A few also show the Shakyamuni Buddha and Maitreya. Like all coins of Kanishka, the design is rather rough and proportions tend to be imprecise; the image of the Buddha is often slightly overdone, with oversize ears and feet spread apart in the same fashion as the Kushan king.

Three types of Kanishka's Buddhist coins are known:

==== Standing Buddha ====
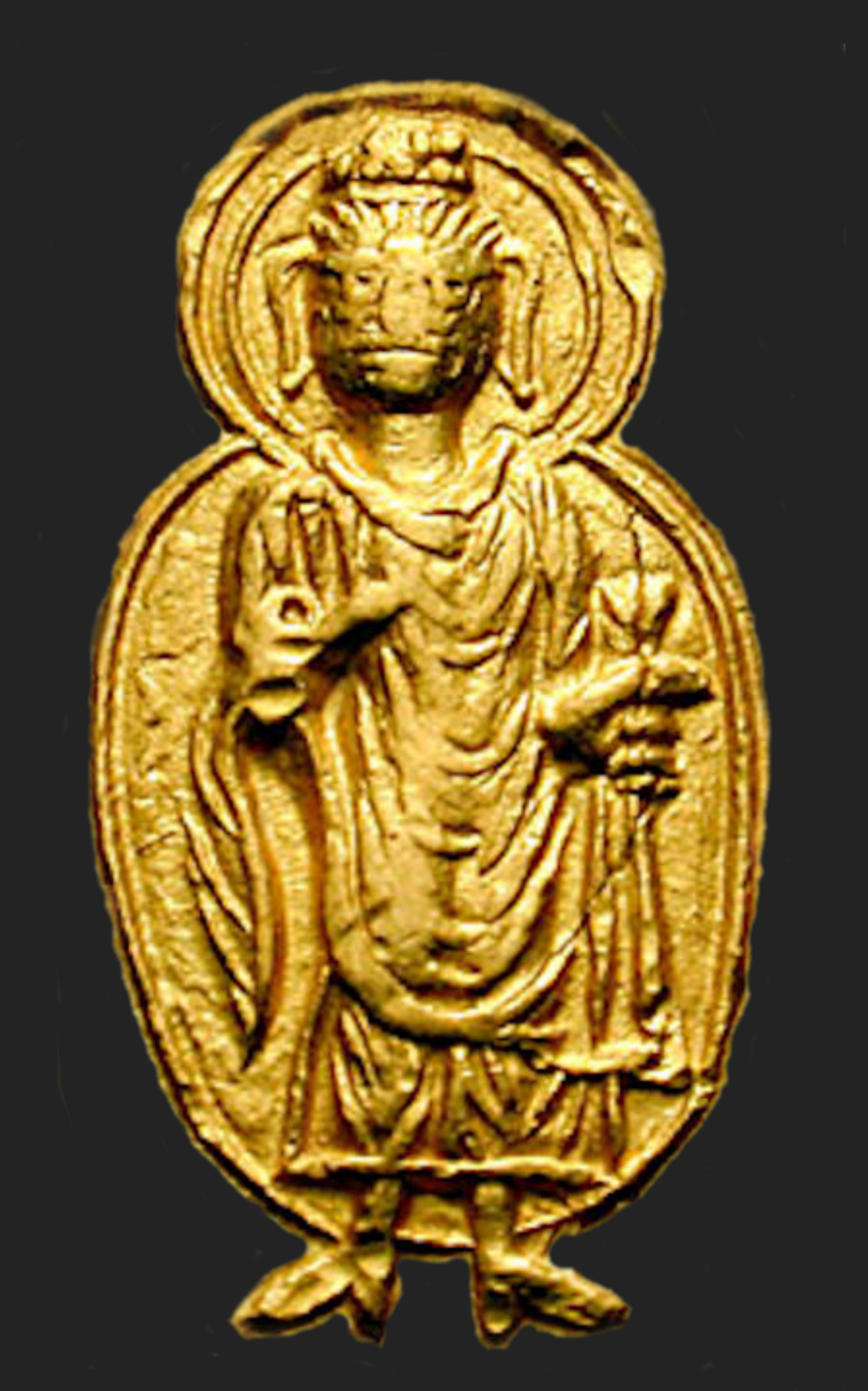
Depiction of the Buddha envelopped in a mandorla in Kanishka's coinage. The mandorla is normally considered as a late evolution in Gandhara art.

Only six Kushan coins of the Buddha are known in gold (the sixth one is the centerpiece of an ancient piece of jewellery, consisting of a Kanishka Buddha coin decorated with a ring of heart-shaped ruby stones). All these coins were minted in gold under Kanishka I, and are in two different denominations: a dinar of about 8 gm, roughly similar to a Roman aureus, and a quarter dinar of about 2 gm. (about the size of an obol).

The Buddha is represented wearing the monastic robe, the antaravasaka, the uttarasanga, and the overcoat sanghati.

The ears are extremely large and long, a symbolic exaggeration possibly rendered necessary by the small size of the coins, but otherwise visible in some later Gandharan statues of the Buddha typically dated to the 3rd–4th century CE (illustration, left). He has an abundant topknot covering the usnisha, often highly stylised in a curly or often globular manner, also visible on later Buddha statues of Gandhara.

In general, the representation of the Buddha on these coins is already highly symbolic, and quite distinct from the more naturalistic and Hellenistic images seen in early Gandhara sculptures. On several designs a mustache is apparent. The palm of his right hand bears the Chakra mark, and his brow bear the urna. An aureola, formed by one, two or three lines, surrounds him.

The full gown worn by the Buddha on the coins, covering both shoulders, suggests a Gandharan model rather than a Mathuran one.

==== "Shakyamuni Buddha" ====
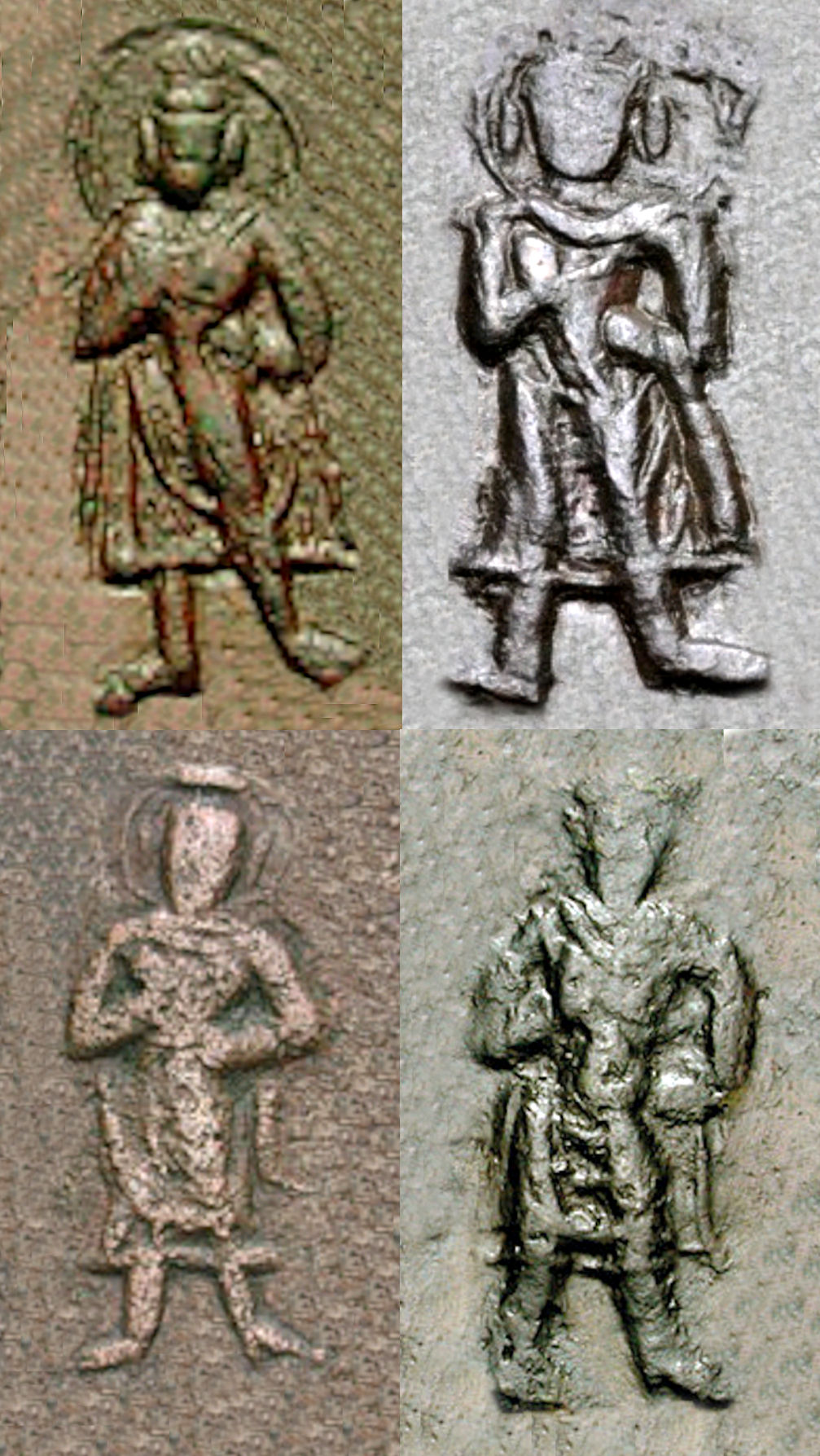
Depictions of the "Shakyamuni Buddha" (with legend ϷΑΚΑΜΑΝΟ ΒΟΔΔΟ "Shakamano Boddo") in Kanishka's coinage.

The Shakyamuni Buddha (with the legend "Sakamano Boudo", i.e. Shakamuni Buddha, another name for the historic Buddha Siddharta Gautama), standing to front, with left hand on hip and forming the abhaya mudra with the right hand. All these coins are in copper only, and usually rather worn.

The gown of the Shakyamuni Buddha is quite light compared to that on the coins in the name of Buddha, clearly showing the outline of the body, in a nearly transparent way. These are probably the first two layers of monastic clothing the antaravasaka and the uttarasanga. Also, his gown is folded over the left arm (rather than being held in the left hand as above), a feature only otherwise known in the Bimaran casket and suggestive of a scarf-like uttariya. He has an abundant topknot covering the ushnisha, and a simple or double halo, sometimes radiating, surrounds his head.

==== "Maitreya Buddha" ====
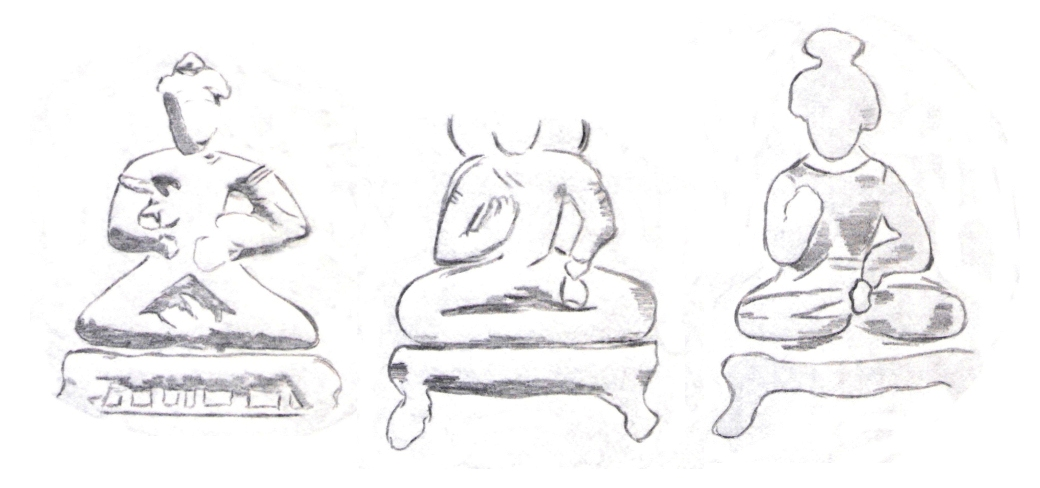
Depictions of "Maitreya" (with legend ΜΕΤΡΑΓΟ ΒΟΔΔΟ "Metrago Boddo") in Kanishka's coinage.

The Bodhisattva Maitreya (with the legend "Metrago Boudo") cross-legged on a throne, holding a water pot, and also forming the Abhaya mudra. These coins are only known in copper and are quite worn out . On the clearest coins, Maitreya seems to be wearing the armbands of an Indian prince, a feature often seen on the statuary of Maitreya. The throne is decorated with small columns, suggesting that the coin representation of Maitreya was directly copied from pre-existing statuary with such well-known features.

The qualification of "Buddha" for Maitreya is inaccurate, as he is instead a Bodhisattva (he is the Buddha of the future).

The iconography of these three types is very different from that of the other deities depicted in Kanishka's coinage. Whether Kanishka's deities are all shown from the side, the Buddhas only are shown frontally, indicating that they were copied from contemporary frontal representations of the standing and seated Buddhas in statuary. Both representations of the Buddha and Shakyamuni have both shoulders covered by their monastic gown, indicating that the statues used as models were from the Gandhara school of art, rather than Mathura.

=== Buddhist statuary under Kanishka ===
Several Buddhist statues are directly connected to the reign of Kanishka, such as several Bodhisattva statues from the art of Mathura, while a few other from Gandhara are inscribed with a date in an era which is now thought to be the Yavana era, starting in 186 to 175 BCE.

Dated statuary under Kanishka
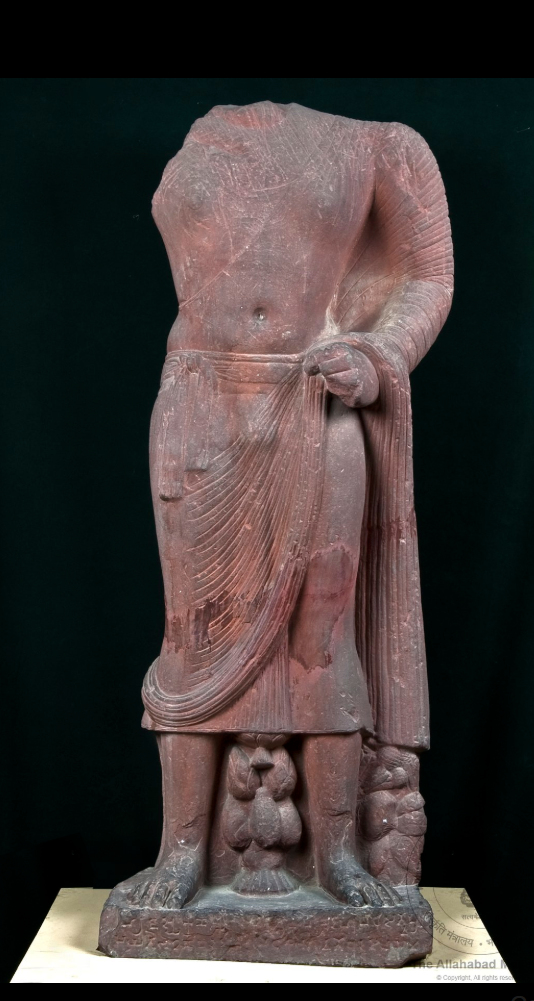
Kosambi Bodhisattva, inscribed "Year 2 of Kanishka".

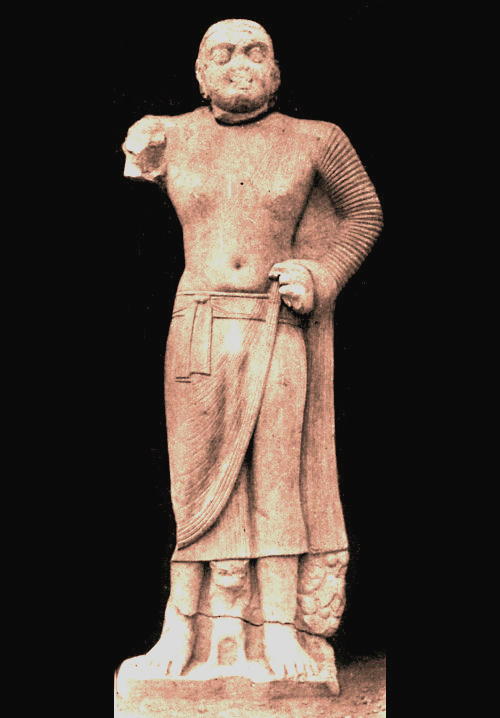
Bala Bodhisattva, Sarnath, inscribed "Year 3 of Kanishka".

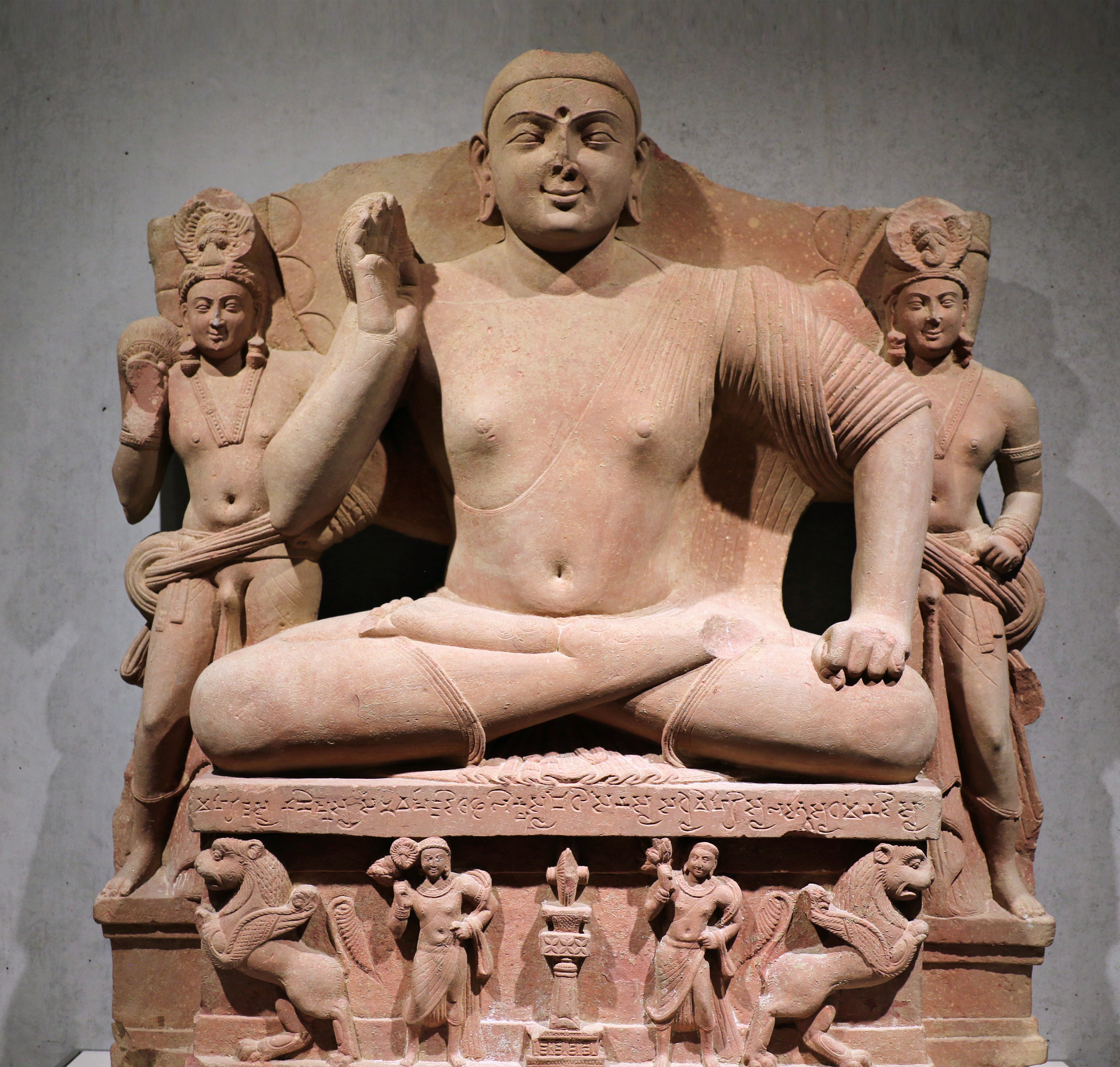
"Kimbell seated Buddha", with inscription "year 4 of Kanishka" (131 CE). Another similar statue has "Year 32 of Kanishka".

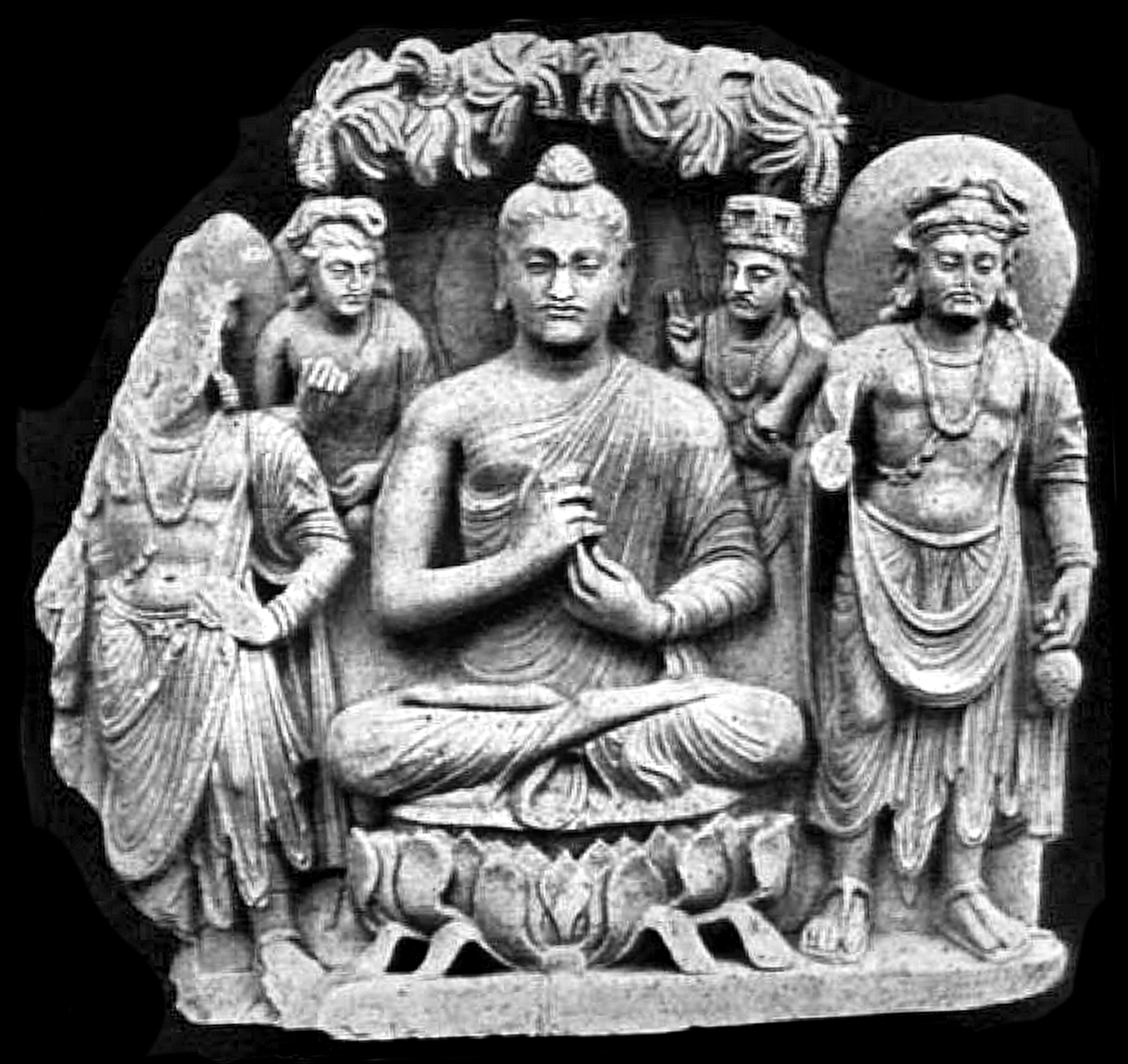
Gandhara Buddhist Triad from Sahr-i-Bahlol, c. 132 CE, similar to the dated Brussels Buddha. Peshawar Museum.

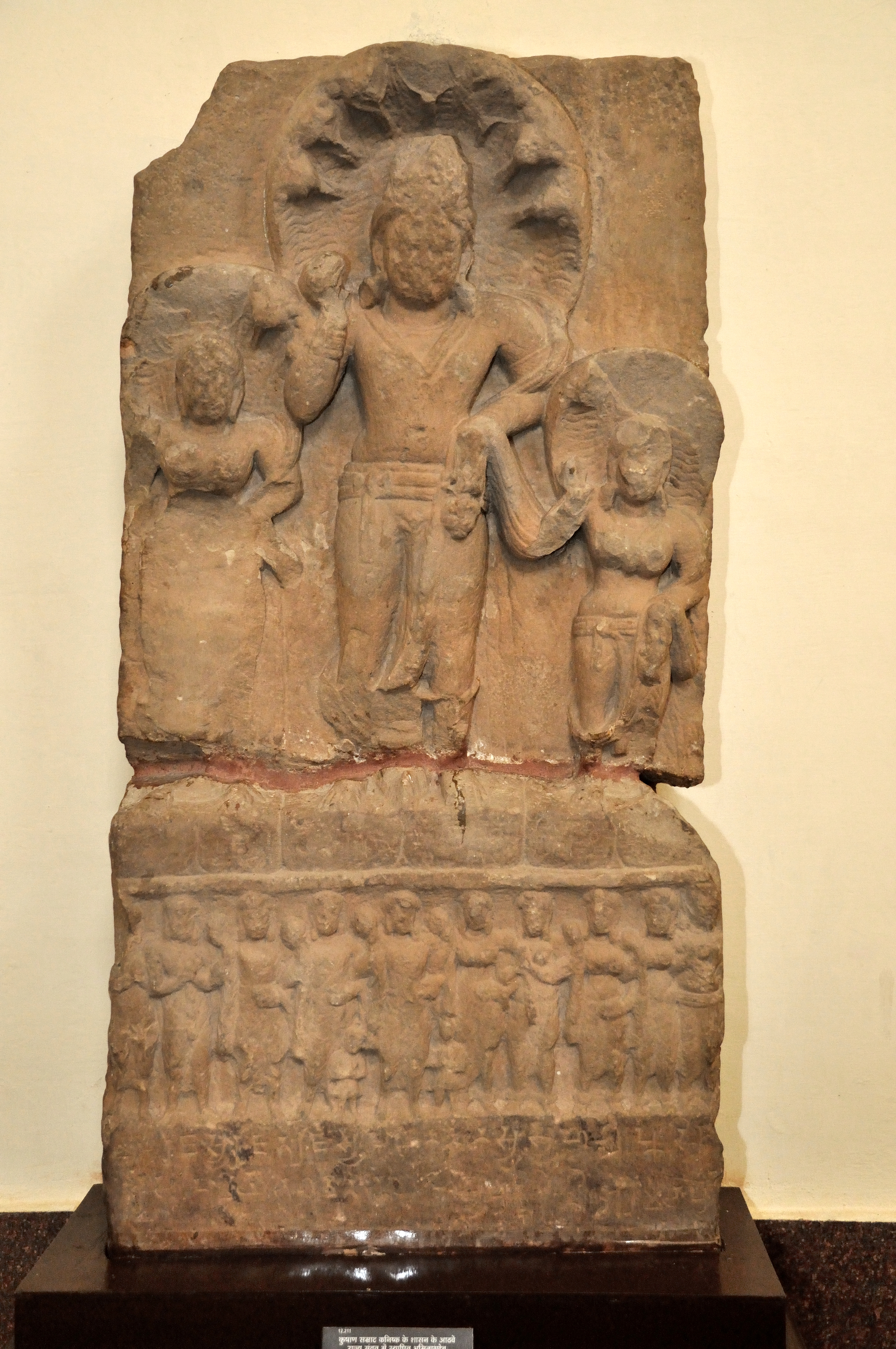
Image of a Nāga between two Nāgīs, inscribed in "the year 8 of Emperor Kanishka". 135 CE.

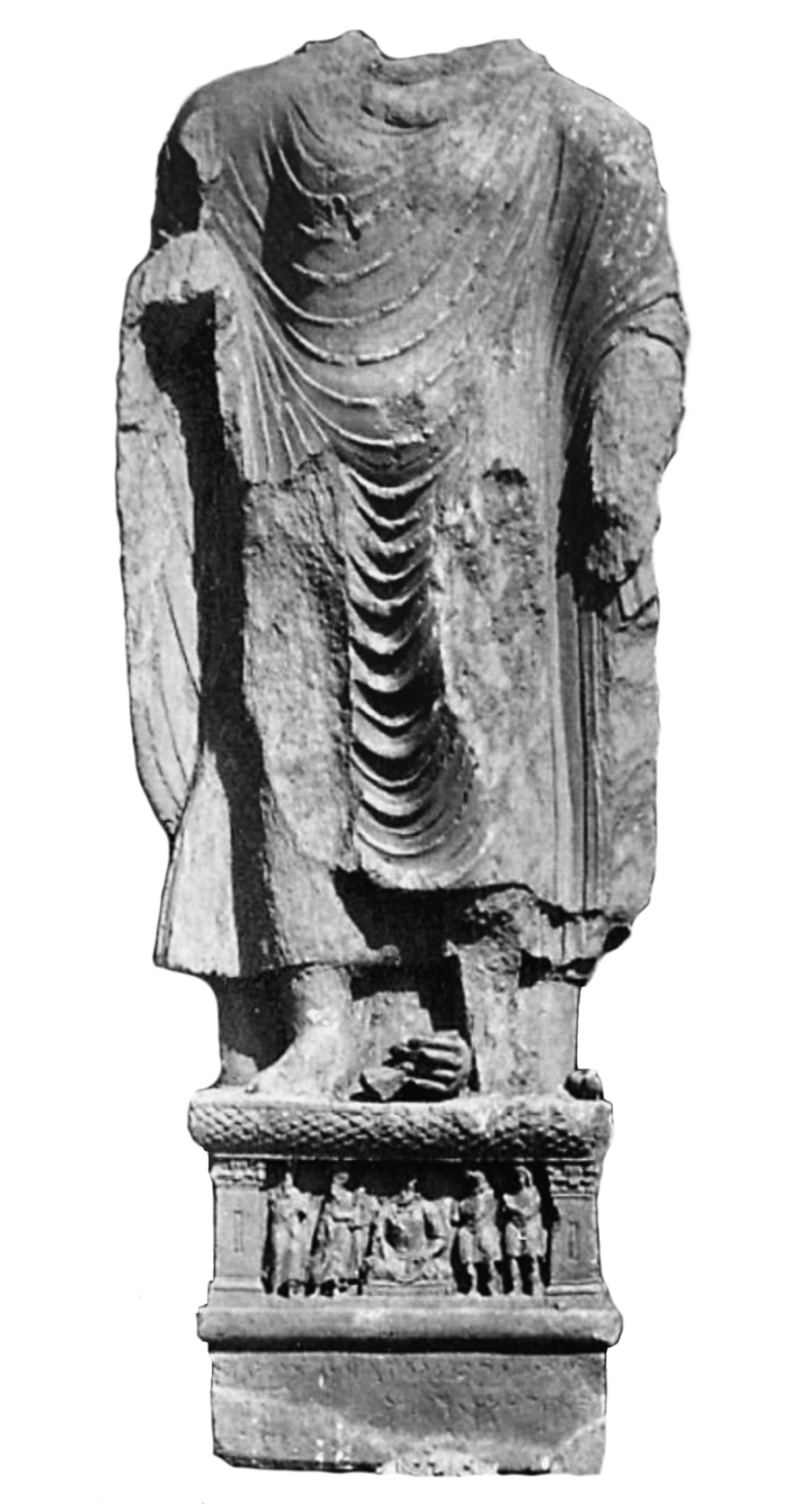
Buddha from Loriyan Tangai with inscription mentioning the "year 318", thought to be 143 CE.

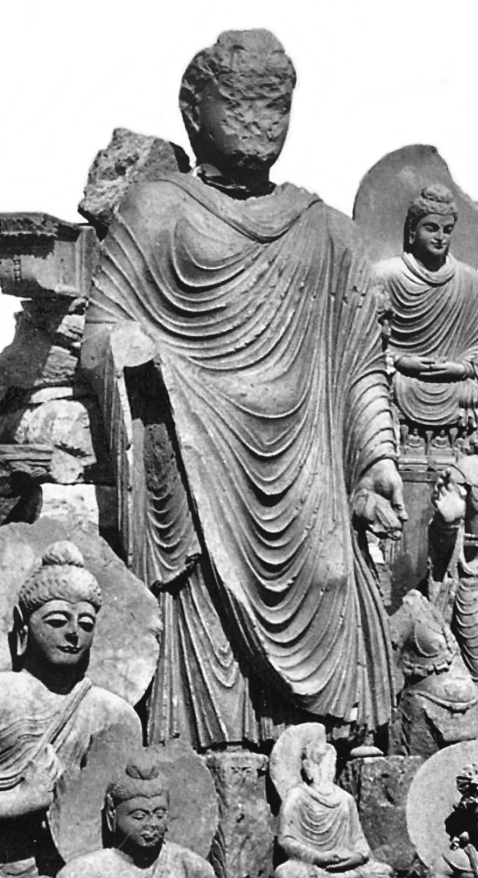
A Buddha from Loriyan Tangai from the same period.

=== Kanishka stupa ===
Kanishka casket

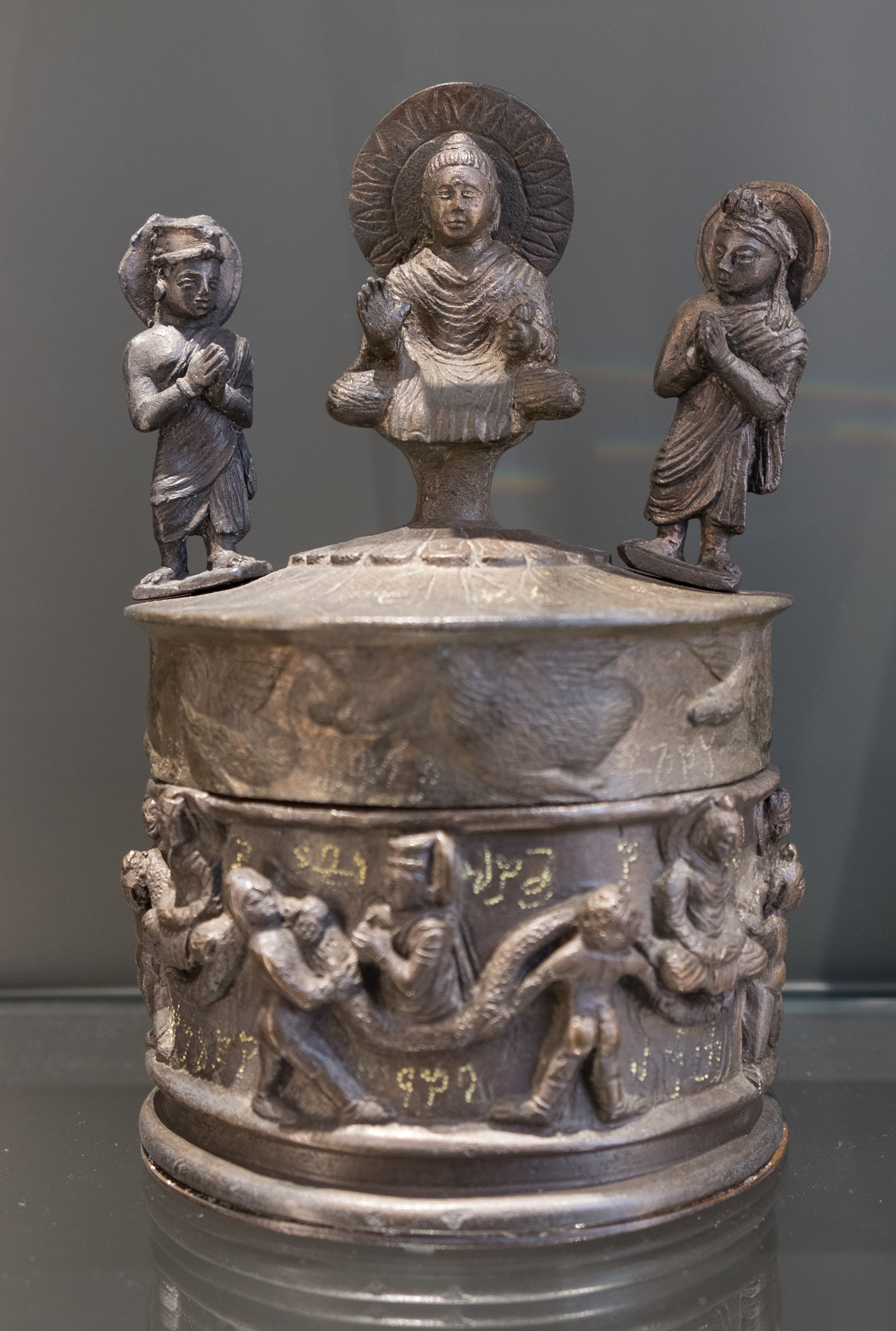
Kanishka casket

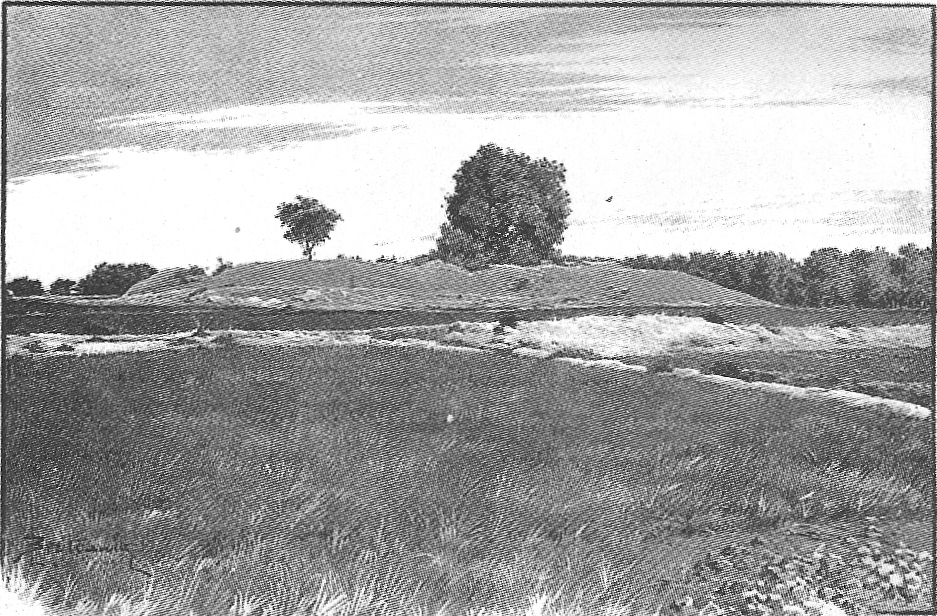
Remnants of the Kanishka stupa.

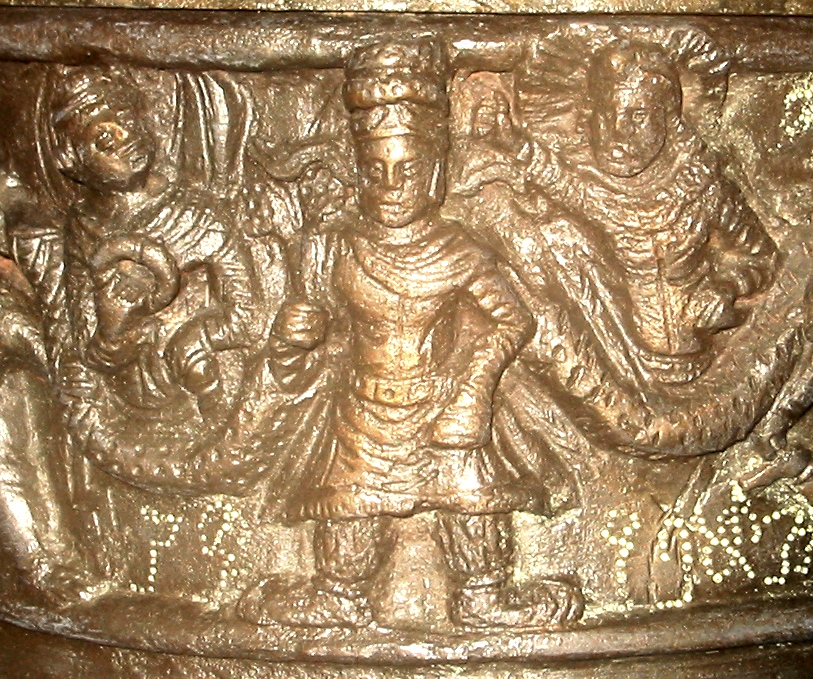
Kanishka, surrounded by the Iranian Sun-God and Moon-God (detail)

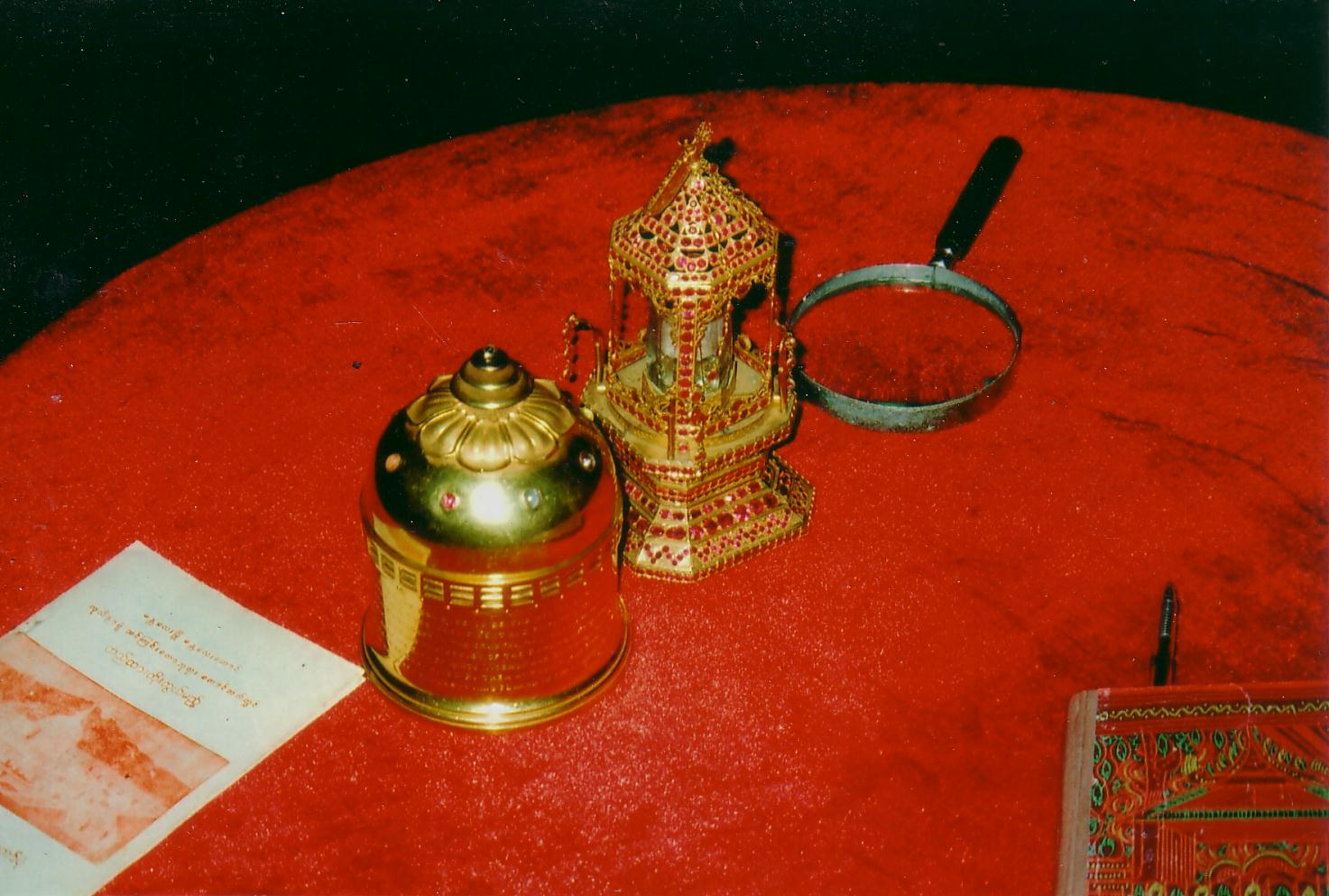
Relics from Kanishka's stupa in Peshawar, sent by the British to Mandalay, Burma in 1910.

The "Kanishka casket", dated to 127 CE, with the Buddha surrounded by Brahma and Indra, and Kanishka standing at the center of the lower part, British Museum.

The Kanishka Casket or "Kanishka reliquary", dated to the first year of Kanishka's reign in 127 CE, was discovered in a deposit chamber under Kanishka stupa, during the archaeological excavations in 1908–1909 in Shah-Ji-Ki-Dheri, just outside the present-day Ganj Gate of the old city of Peshawar. It is today at the Peshawar Museum, and a copy is in the British Museum. It is said to have contained three bone fragments of the Buddha, which are now housed in Mandalay, Burma.

The casket is dedicated in Kharosthi. The inscription reads:

"(*mahara)jasa kanishkasa kanishka-pure nagare aya gadha-karae deya-dharme sarva-satvana hita-suhartha bhavatu mahasenasa sagharaki dasa agisala nava-karmi ana*kanishkasa vihare mahasenasa sangharame"

The text is signed by the maker, a Greek artist named Agesilas, who oversaw work at Kanishka's stupas (caitya), confirming the direct involvement of Greeks with Buddhist realisations at such a late date: "The servant Agisalaos, the superintendent of works at the vihara of Kanishka in the monastery of Mahasena" ("dasa agisala nava-karmi ana*kaniskasa vihara mahasenasa sangharame").

The lid of the casket shows the Buddha on a lotus pedestal, and worshipped by Brahma and Indra. The edge of the lid is decorated by a frieze of flying geese. The body of the casket represents a Kushan monarch, probably Kanishka in person, with the Iranian sun and moon gods on his side. On the sides are two images of a seated Buddha, worshiped by royal figures, can be assumed as Kanishka. A garland, supported by cherubs goes around the scene in typical Hellenistic style.

The attribution of the casket to Kanishka has been recently disputed, essentially on stylistic ground (for example the ruler shown on the casket is not bearded, to the contrary of Kanishka). Instead, the casket is often attributed to Kanishka's successor Huvishka.

=== Kanishka in Buddhist tradition ===
In Buddhist tradition, Kanishka is often described as an aggressive, hot tempered, rigid, strict, and a bit harsh kind of King before he got converted to Buddhism of which he was very fond, and after his conversion to Buddhism, he became an openhearted, benevolent, and faithful ruler. As in the Sri-dharma-pitaka-nidana sutra:

"At this time the King of Ngan-si (Pahlava) was very aggressive and of a violent nature....There was a bhikshu (monk) arhat who seeing the harsh deeds done by the king wished to make him repent. So by his supernatural force he caused the king to see the torments of hell. The king was terrified and repented and cried terribly and hence dissolved all his negatives within him and got self realised for the first time in life ." Śri-dharma-piṭaka-nidāna sūtra

Additionally, the arrival of Kanishka was reportedly foretold or was predicted by the Buddha, as well as the construction of his stupa:

". . . the Buddha, pointing to a small boy making a mud tope....[said] that on that spot Kaṇiṣka would erect a tope by his name." Vinaya sutra

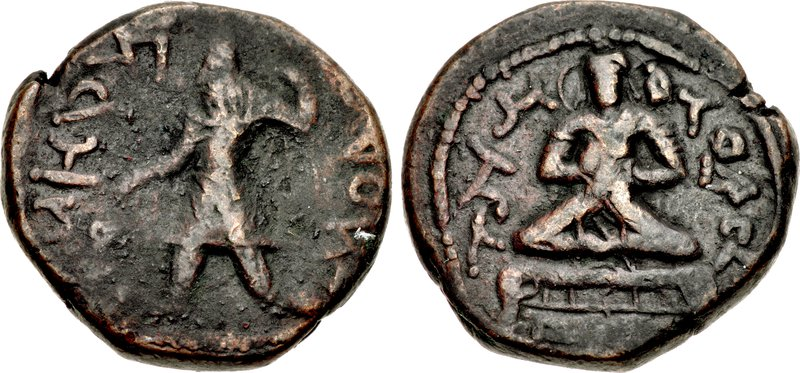
Coin of Kanishka with the Bodhisattva Maitreya "Metrago Boudo".

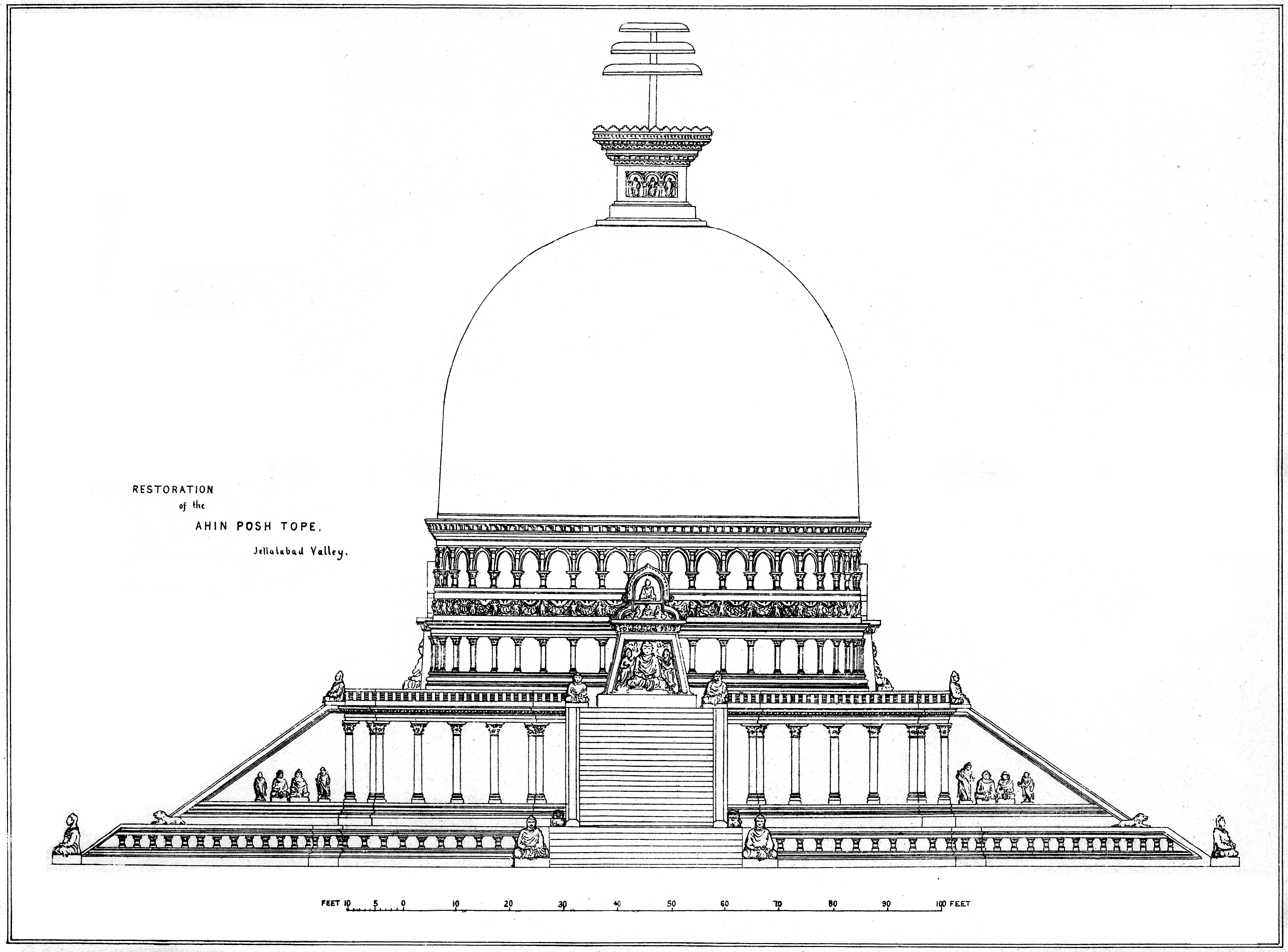
The Ahin Posh stupa was dedicated in the 2nd century CE and contained coins of Kaniska

The same story is repeated in a Khotanese scroll found at Dunhuang, which first described how Kanishka would arrive 400 years after the death of the Buddha. The account also describes how Kanishka came to raise his stupa:

"A desire thus arose in [Kanishka to build a vast stupa]....at that time the four world-regents learnt the mind of the king. So for his sake they took the form of young boys....[and] began a stūpa of mud....the boys said to [Kanishka] 'We are making the Kaṇiṣka-stūpa.'....At that time the boys changed their form....[and] said to him, 'Great king, by you according to the Buddha's prophecy is a Saṅghārāma to be built wholly (?) with a large stūpa and hither relics must be invited which the meritorious good beings...will bring."

Chinese pilgrims to India, such as Xuanzang, who travelled there around 630 CE also relays the story:

"Kaṇiṣka became sovereign of all Jambudvīpa (Indian subcontinent) but he did not believe in Karma, but he treated Buddhism with honor and respect as he himself converted to Buddhism intrigued by the teachings and scriptures of it. When he was hunting in the wild country a white hare appeared; the king gave a chase and the hare suddenly disappeared at [the site of the future stupa]....[when the construction of the stūpa was not going as planned] the king lost his patience and took the matter in his own hands and started resurrecting the plans precisely, thus completing the stupas with utmost perfection and perseverance. These two stupas are still in existence and were resorted to for cures by people afflicted with diseases."

King Kanishka because of his deeds was highly respected, regarded, honored by all the people he ruled and governed and was regarded the greatest king who ever lived because of his kindness, humbleness and sense of equality and self-righteousness among all aspects. Thus such great deeds and character of the king Kanishka made his name immortal and thus he was regarded "THE KING OF KINGS"

=== Transmission of Buddhism to China ===
Buddhist monks from the region of Gandhara played a key role in the development and the transmission of Buddhist ideas in the direction of northern Asia from the middle of the 2nd century CE. The Kushan monk, Lokaksema (c. 178 CE), became the first translator of Mahayana Buddhist scriptures into Chinese and established a translation bureau at the Chinese capital Loyang. Central Asian and East Asian Buddhist monks appear to have maintained strong exchanges for the following centuries.

Kanishka was probably succeeded by Huvishka. How and when this came about is still uncertain. The inscription on The Sacred Rock of Hunza also shows the signs of Kanishka.

== See also ==
- Menander I
- Greco-Buddhism

== Footnotes ==
Territories/ dates	Western India	Western Pakistan Balochistan	Paropamisadae Arachosia	Bajaur	Gandhara	Western Punjab	Eastern Punjab	Mathura	Pataliputra
				INDO-SCYTHIAN KINGDOM			INDO-GREEK KINGDOM	INDO-SCYTHIAN Northern Satraps	
25 BCE – 10 CE				Indo-Scythian dynasty of the APRACHARAJAS; Vijayamitra (ruled 12 BCE – 15 CE) (Note: From the dated inscription on the Rukhana reliquary)	Liaka Kusulaka; Patika Kusulaka; Zeionises	Kharahostes (ruled 10 BCE– 10 CE); Mujatria	Strato II and Strato III	Hagana	
10-20CE		INDO-PARTHIAN KINGDOM; Gondophares		Indravasu	INDO-PARTHIAN KINGDOM; Gondophares		Rajuvula		
20–30 CE			Ubouzanes; Pakores	Vispavarma (ruled c. 0–20 CE)	Sarpedones		Bhadayasa	Sodasa	
30-40 CE			KUSHAN EMPIRE; Kujula Kadphises (c. 50–90)	Indravarma	Abdagases		...	...	
40–45 CE				Aspavarma	Gadana		...	...	
45–50 CE				Sasan	Sases		...	...	
50–75 CE							...	...	
75–100 CE	Indo-Scythian dynasty of the WESTERN SATRAPS; Chastana		Vima Takto (c. 90–113)				...	...	
100–120 CE	Abhiraka		Vima Kadphises (c. 113–127)						
120 CE	Bhumaka; Nahapana	PARATARAJAS; Yolamira	Kanishka I (c. 127–151)				Great Satrap Kharapallana and Satrap Vanaspara for Kanishka I		
130–230 CE	Jayadaman; Rudradaman I Damajadasri I Jivadaman; Rudrasimha I Isvaradatta; Rudrasimha I Jivadaman; Rudrasena I	Bagamira; Arjuna; Hvaramira; Mirahvara	Huvishka (c. 151 – c. 190); Vasudeva I (c. 190 – 230)						
230–250 CE	Samghadaman; Damasena; Damajadasri II; Viradaman; Yasodaman I Vijayasena; Damajadasri III; Rudrasena II; Visvasimha	Miratakhma; Kozana; Bhimarjuna; Koziya; Datarvharna; Datarvharna	KUSHANO-SASANIANS; Ardashir I (c. 230 – 250); Ardashir II (?-245)	Kanishka II (c. 230 – 247)					
250–280	Samghadaman; Damasena; Damajadasri II; Viradaman; Yasodaman I Vijayasena; Damajadasri III; Rudrasena II; Visvasimha	Miratakhma; Kozana; Bhimarjuna; Koziya; Datarvharna; Datarvharna	Peroz I, "Kushanshah" (c. 250 – 265); Hormizd I, "Kushanshah" (c. 265 – 295)			Vāsishka (c. 247 – 267); Kanishka III (c. 267 – 270)			
280–300	Bhratadarman	Datayola II	Hormizd II, "Kushanshah" (c. 295 – 300)			Vasudeva II (c. 267 – 300)		GUPTA EMPIRE; Chandragupta I Samudragupta; Chandragupta II	
300–320 CE	Visvasena; Rudrasimha II; Jivadaman		Peroz II, "Kushanshah" (c. 300 – 325)			Mahi (c. 300–305); Shaka (c. 305 – 335)		GUPTA EMPIRE; Chandragupta I Samudragupta; Chandragupta II	
320–388 CE	Yasodaman II; Rudradaman II; Rudrasena III; Simhasena; Rudrasena IV		Varahran I (325–350); Shapur II Sassanid king and "Kushanshah" (c. 350)			Kipunada (c. 335 – 350)		GUPTA EMPIRE; Chandragupta I Samudragupta; Chandragupta II	
388–396 CE	Rudrasimha III		KIDARITES invasion					GUPTA EMPIRE; Chandragupta I Samudragupta; Chandragupta II	
