= Family tree of the Arsacids =

Family tree of the Arsacids.

The solid lines show parent-to-child lineage and dashed lines indicate a questionable blood relationship or adopted siblings. Official monarchs have their names in bold to distinguish them from pretenders or rival claimants.

**Arsaces I** (247-217 B.C.)	Tiridates Ι
**Arsaces II** (217-191 B.C.)	□
**Phriapatius** (191-176 B.C.)
**Phraates I** (176-165 B.C.)	**Mithridates I** (165-132 B.C.)	**Artabanus Ι** (127-124 B.C.)
**Sanatruces** (75-69 B.C.)	**Phraates II** (132-127 B.C.	**Mithridates II** (124-91 B.C.)
**Phraates III** (69-57 B.C.)	**Gotarzes I** (91-80 B.C.)	**Mithridates III** (87-80 B.C.)
**Orodes II** (57-38 B.C.)	**Orodes I** (80-75 B.C.)
**Phraates IV** (38-2 B.C.)	Pacorus I (39 B.C.)	Tiridates II (29-26 B.C.)	Mithridates (10 B.C.)
**Phraates V** (2 B.C.-A.D. 4)	**Vonones I** (8-12)	□	□	Phraates (35)
**Orodes III** (6)	**Artabanus II** (10-38)	Cinnamus (37)	**Vonones II** (51)	Tiridates III (35-36)	Mehardates (49)
**Vardanes I** (40-47)	(adopted); **Gotarzes II** (40-51)	**Vologases I** (51-78)	Sanabares (50-65)
Vardanes II (54-58)	Vologases II (77-80)	**Pacorus II** (78-105)	Artabanus III (79/80-81)
**Vologases III** (105-147)	Parthamasiris	Axidares	Mithridates V (129-140)	Osroes I (109-129)
Tiridates IV (224-228)	**Vologases IV** (147-191)	Sinatruces II (116)	Parthamaspates (116)	Osroes II (190)
**Vologases V** (192-208)
Rev I of Iberia	**Vologases VI** (208-228)	**Artabanus IV** (216-224)	Khosrov I of Armenia
Arsacids of Iberia	**Ardashir I** Founder of the Sasanian Empire	Murrod	(unnamed)	Arsacids of Armenia

== See also ==
- List of rulers of Parthian sub-kingdoms
