= Alan raids of 135 =

Invasion of the Alans into Parthia and Rome

Date	135 AD
Location	Caucasian Albania, Atropatene, Armenia, Cappadocia
Result	Iberian-Alan victory
Territorial changes	Albania, Atropatene, Armenia plundered

Belligerents
Kingdom of Iberia: Alans	Parthian Empire; Caucasian Albania; Atropatene; Armenia; Roman Empire; Armenia; Cappadocia

Commanders and leaders
Pharasmanes II	Hadrian; Flavius Arrianus; Vologases III

The Alan raids of 135 were a series of military campaigns conducted by the Alans into the Parthian and Roman vassal states and Roman province of Cappadocia. The overall campaign was instigated by Pharasmanes II of Iberia, who opened the Darial Pass for the Alans to attack Parthian territories.

== Background ==
=== The Alans ===
The Alans were an ancient Iranian nomadic pastoral people of the North Caucasus, generally regarded as part of the Sarmatians and possibly related to the Massagetae. In the first century, Alans moved from their homeland in the lower reaches of the Oxus river to the lower Don basin and Azov sea, displacing previous Sarmatian inhabitants, Aorsi and Sindaces. Their army consisted mostly of mailed cavalry.

The Alans are first mentioned in connection with the Caucasus in the 1st century AD. They were frequently hired as mercenaries and instigated to conduct raids by the interested powers. The Jewish historian Josephus records a major Alanian raid in 72 AD, when they crossed the Iron Gates (the Darial Pass) with the permission of the king of Hyrcania, plundered Media and Armenia, and defeated the armies of Pacorus, king of Media, and Tiridates, king of Armenia. Josephus notes that only a large ransom saved the Parthian king's family from captivity. This raid was part of a pattern of Alanian incursions into Transcaucasia, with documented attacks in 35 AD (during the Iberian–Parthian war), 72 AD, and finally 135 AD. Scholars suggest that Alanian military-political presence in the region, beginning in the second half of the 1st century AD, was more or less continuous, manifesting itself either as open invasions or as more subtle forms of influence.

=== Iberia ===
In the second century, the Kingdom of Iberia held a crucial strategic position in the Caucasus. Iberia, along with the neighboring Kingdom of Albania, became Roman vassals after the Roman invasions in 65 and 36 BC, however, they managed to retain a substantial autonomy. The control of the Darlian Pass allowed Iberia to exercise the crucial advantage, enabling the control over the movement of the nomads through the Caucasus Mountains.

Following the eastern conquests by Trajan, the Roman Empire strengthened its positions in the Caucasus, but under the subsequent emperors Hadrian and Antoninus Pius, they decided to relax the Roman rule in the East and redirect the imperial resources elsewhere, thereby allowing various vassal kings to pursue more autonomous policies, with the Roman rule resembling a protectorate.

=== Prelude to the 135 invasion ===
In the early 130s, Iberian king Pharasmanes II sought to assert full independence from the Rome, and in 131 rejected Hadrian's invitation to his conference with the Western Asian subject monarchs, which would have emphasized dependent status of Pharasmanes. There was an exchange of gifts between Romans and Iberians after Romans sent their gifts to Pharasmanes. When Pharasmanes sent to Hadrian a number of cloaks made of cloth-of-gold, Hadrian insulted Pharsmanus by employing his gifts as adornment for 300 prisoners.

Relations between Romans and Iberians became strained, and Rome concentrated five auxiliary cohorts at Apsarus, on border with Iberia, which was by far the largest Roman troop concentration at the Black Sea coast. The Romans were unhappy about the expansion of Iberian territory after Zydretae tribe submitted to Pharasmanes II, concentrating their troops at the border in response.

== The raid ==
In 135 AD, Pharasmanes II, the king of Iberia (modern Georgia), opened the Darial Pass (also known as the Alan Gates or Caspian Gates) for the Alans living north of the Caucasus. His goal was to instigate their raids into the Roman and Parthian territories.

Pharasmanes II first unleashed the nomads against the Albanians, another Roman vassal with which Iberians had an intermittent hostility. Albanians most likely asked for assistance to Media Atropatene, a Parthian vassal, and Pharasmanes unleashed the nomads against them as well.

Alans raided Media Atropenate, and then moved to Armenia, ruled by Parthian king Parthamaspates. King of Parthia, Vologases III bought off the invaders, saving Armenia from plunder. After that, Alans moved westwards, reaching Roman province of Cappadocia. However, they were met by Flavius Arrianus, a Roman consular legate of Cappadocia between 131 and 137, who assembled 18,000 troops against the nomads. The Alans, having already plundered many territories, decided not to take risks and not to engage in a battle. A direct confrontation never happened. The demonstration of force by Arrianus diverted the nomads back to the north in the Caucasus.

== Aftermath ==
Vologases, King of Parthia, complained about the actions of Pharasmanes to the Romans, however, instead of holding Pharasmanes accountable, Hadrian invited him to Rome and enlarged his territory. Hadrian was not strong enough to hold Pharsmanus responsible for instigating the nomadic invasion. Vologases was not happy about this, but was forced to endure not to stir up relations with Rome. Parsmanes was compelled to arrive to Rome, where Antoninus Pius allowed him to sacrifice on the Capitoline Hill – an unprecedented honor for a non-Roman ruler, a statue of Parsmanes was erected in the Temple of Bellona, and he was granted the augmentation of territory. Despite this, Pharsmanus did not manage to gain full independence from Rome. He was still compelled to accept Roman suzerainty by travelling to Rome, a Roman auxiliary cohort was stationed in Iberia and a Roman officer was installed at Iberian court by Arrian.

== See also ==
- Flavius Arrianus
- Pharasmanes II
- Alans

== Sources ==
- Alemany, Agustí. Sources on the Alans: A Critical Compilation. Brill, 2000. ISBN 978-90-04-11442-5.
- Cassius Dio. Roman History. Translated by Earnest Cary. Loeb Classical Library, 1927. (Book LXVIII, chapter 15)
- Chronicle of Arbela. Edited and translated by P. Kawerau. CSCO 467–68 / Syr. 199–200. Louvain, 1985.
- Josephus. The Jewish War. Translated by H. St. J. Thackeray. Loeb Classical Library, 1928. (Book VII, chapter 7)
- Austin, N.J.E.; Rankov, N.B. Exploratio: Military & Political Intelligence in the Roman World. Routledge, 2002.
- Rawlinson, George (1885). The Seven Great Monarchies of the Ancient Eastern World. J. W. Lovell Company.
- Bury, John Bagnell (1893). The Student's Roman Empire: A History of the Roman Empire from Its Foundation to the Death of Marcus Aurelius. Harper.
- Bosworth, Brian (1977). "Arrian and the Alani". Harvard Studies in Classical Philology. 81. Department of the Classics, Harvard University.
- Mommsen, Theodor (1899). The Provinces of the Roman Empire: From Caesar to Diocletian. Vol. 2. Charles Scribner's Sons.
- მელიქიშვილი, გიორგი (1970). საქართველოს ისტორიის ნარკვევები. Vol. 1. საბჭოთა საქართველო.
- Нефёдкин, Александр (1999). "КАМПАНИЯ АРРИАНА ПО ОТРАЖЕНИЮ АЛАНСКОГО НАБЕГА НА КАППАДОКИЮ В 135 Г." Stratum plus (in Russian). 3: 174.
