= Sanabares of Parthia =

Sanabares
- King of Kings
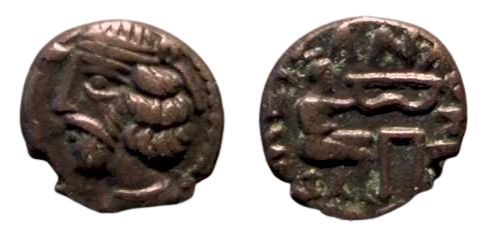
- Obv: bareheaded crowned bust left, tapering beard, hair close to head in three waves Rev: archer seated right with bow, below bow Π; inscription: [ΒΑΣΙΛΕ]ΥΣ ΣΑΝΑΒ[ΑΡΗΣ] (Note: Translation:[KING] SANAB[ARES])

King of Parthia
- Reign: c.50–c.65
- Predecessor: Gotarzes II
- Successor: Vologases I
- Contenders: Gotarzes II (50–51); Vonones II (51); Vologases I (51-65); Vardanes II (55-58)
- Died: c.65 Merv (?)
- Dynasty: Arsacid (?) (Note: Unlike the other rival kings of Parthia who had known family links to the dynasty, his (if he had any) are unknown)
- Religion: Zoroastrianism

Sanabares of Parthia was a rival king of the Parthian Empire from ca. 50 to 65.

There is not much known about Sanabares, except from a few coins witnessing to his rule as a Parthian king, with his capital in the city of Merv for about fifteen years. This much we owe to the dates known from certain coins of Sanabares. He was rival to Gotarzes II of Parthia (reigned 40–51), Vonones II of Parthia (reigned 51), Vologases I of Parthia (reigned 51–78) and Vardanes II of Parthia (reigned 55–58).

His known mints were:

- Margiane (modern day Merv, Turkmenistan)
- Mithradatkart (modern day Ashgabat, Turkmenistan).

His fate after 65 AD is unknown but it can be assumed that he likely passed away or was eliminated.

== Sources ==
- (in Italian) F. Chiesa: Osservazione sulla monetazione Indo-Partica. Sanabares I e Sanabares II incertezze ed ipotesie in Festschrift Herbert A. Cahn zum 70. Geburtstag, München 1982, S. 15-22
- David Sellwood: An Introduction to the Coinage of Parthia (1980, 2nd edition), (attribution of the coins)
