= Roman–Parthian War of 58–63 =

Roman/Parthian war over control of Armenia (AD 58-63)

- Part of the Roman–Parthian Wars
Date	58–63 AD
Location	Armenia
Result	Stalemate; Treaty of Rhandeia; Arsacids established on Armenian throne

Belligerents
Roman Empire; Roman clients • Sophene • Lesser Armenia • Iberia • Commagene • Pontus	Kingdom of Armenia; Parthian Empire

Commanders and leaders
Gnaeus Domitius Corbulo; Tiberius Julius Alexander; Tigranes VI of Armenia; Lucius Caesennius Paetus	Tiridates I of Armenia; Vologases I of Parthia

Units involved
30,000 legionaries (6 legions)	18,000 cavalry

Casualties and losses
11,000 killed or surrendered	12,000 killed

The Roman–Parthian War of 58–63 or the War of the Armenian Succession was fought between the Roman Empire and the Parthian Empire over control of Armenia, an important buffer state between the two realms. Armenia had been a Roman client state since the days of Emperor Augustus, but in 52/53, the Parthians succeeded in installing their own candidate, Tiridates, on the Armenian throne.

These events coincided with the accession of Nero to the imperial throne in Rome, and the young emperor decided to react vigorously. The war, which was the only major foreign campaign of his reign, began with rapid success for the Roman forces, led by the able general Gnaeus Domitius Corbulo. They overcame the forces loyal to Tiridates, installed their own candidate, Tigranes VI, on the Armenian throne, and left the country. The Romans were aided by the fact that the Parthian king Vologases was embroiled in the suppression of a series of revolts in his own country. As soon as these had been dealt with, however, the Parthians turned their attention to Armenia, and after a couple of years of inconclusive campaigning, inflicted a heavy defeat on the Romans in the Battle of Rhandeia.

The conflict ended soon after, in an effective stalemate and a formal compromise: a Parthian prince of the Arsacid line would henceforth sit on the Armenian throne, but his nomination had to be approved by the Roman emperor. This conflict was the first direct confrontation between Parthia and the Romans since Crassus' disastrous expedition and Mark Antony's campaigns a century earlier, and would be the first of a long series of wars between Rome and Iranian Empires over Armenia (see Roman–Persian Wars).

== Background ==
Ever since the expanding Roman Republic and the Parthian Empire had come into contact in the mid-1st century BC, there had been friction between the two great powers of the Near East over the control of the various states lying between them. The largest and most important of these was the Kingdom of Armenia. In 20 BC, Augustus succeeded in establishing a Roman protectorate over the country, when Tigranes III was enthroned as king of Armenia. Roman influence was secured through a series of Roman-sponsored kings until 37 AD, when a Parthian-supported candidate, Orodes, assumed the throne. The Roman-supported king, Mithridates, recovered his throne with the support of Emperor Claudius in 42 AD, but was deposed in 51 AD by his nephew Rhadamistus of Iberia. His rule quickly became unpopular, however, and this gave the newly crowned king Vologases I of Parthia the opportunity to intervene. His forces quickly seized the two capitals of Armenia, Artaxata and Tigranocerta, and put his younger brother Tiridates on the throne. The onset of a bitter winter and the outbreak of an epidemic forced the Parthian forces to withdraw, allowing Rhadamistus to retake control of the country. His behavior towards his subjects, however, was even worse than before, and they rose in rebellion against him. Thus, in 54 AD Rhadamistus fled to his father's court in Iberia, and Tiridates re-established himself in Armenia.

In the same year, in Rome, Emperor Claudius died and was succeeded by his stepson Nero. The Parthian encroachment in an area regarded as lying within the Roman sphere of influence worried the Roman leadership, and was widely seen as a major test of the new emperor's ability. Nero reacted vigorously, appointing Gnaeus Domitius Corbulo, a general who had distinguished himself in Germania and now served as governor of Asia, to supreme command in the East.

== Diplomatic maneuvers and preparations ==
Armenia and the Roman East in ca. 50 AD, before the outbreak of the war.

Corbulo was given control over two provinces, Cappadocia and Galatia (modern-day central Turkey), with propraetorial and later proconsular authority or imperium. Although Galatia was considered a good recruiting-ground and Cappadocia had a few units of auxiliaries, the bulk of his army came from Syria, where half the garrison of four legions and several units of auxiliaries was transferred to his command.

Initially, the Romans hoped to resolve the situation by diplomatic means: Corbulo and Ummidius Quadratus, the governor of Syria, both sent embassies to Vologases, proposing that he give up hostages, as was customary during negotiations, to ensure good faith. Vologases, himself preoccupied by the revolt of his son Vardanes which forced him to withdraw his troops from Armenia, readily complied. A period of inactivity ensued, while the Armenian issue remained in limbo. Corbulo used this lull to restore his troops' discipline and combat readiness, which had diminished in the peaceful garrisons of the East. According to Tacitus, Corbulo discharged all who were old or in ill health, kept the entire army under canvas in the harsh winters of the Anatolian plateau to acclimatize them to the snows of Armenia, and enforced a strict discipline, punishing deserters by death. At the same time, however, he took care to be constantly present amongst his men, sharing their hardships.

In the meantime, Tiridates, backed by his brother, refused to go to Rome, and even engaged in operations against those Armenians whom he deemed were loyal to Rome. Tension mounted and finally, in the early spring of 58, war broke out.

== Outbreak of the war — The Roman offensive ==
Corbulo had placed a large number of his auxiliaries in a line of forts near the Armenian frontier under a former primus pilus, Paccius Orfitus. Disobeying Corbulo's orders, he used some newly arrived auxiliary cavalry alae to stage a raid against the Armenians, who appeared to be unprepared. In the event, his raid failed, and the retreating troops even spread their panic amongst the garrisons of the other forts. It was an inauspicious start for a campaign, and Corbulo severely punished the survivors and their commanders.

Having drilled his army for two years, Corbulo, despite this misadventure, was ready. He had three legions at his disposal (III Gallica and VI Ferrata from Syria and IV Scythica), to which were added a large number of auxiliaries and allied contingents from Eastern client kings like Aristobulus of Lesser Armenia and Polemon II of Pontus. The situation was furthermore favorable to the Romans: Vologases faced a serious revolt by the Hyrcanians in the region of the Caspian Sea as well as incursions of Dahae and Sacae nomads from Central Asia, and was unable to support his brother.

The war thus far had featured mostly skirmishing along the Roman–Armenian border. Corbulo tried to protect the pro-Roman Armenian settlements from attack, and simultaneously retaliated against the Parthians' supporters. Given that Tiridates avoided confrontation in a pitched battle, Corbulo divided his force, so that they could attack several places simultaneously, and instructed his allies, Kings Antiochus IV of Commagene and Pharasmanes I of Iberia, to raid Armenia from their own territories. In addition, an alliance was concluded with the Moschoi, a tribe living in northwestern Armenia.

Tiridates reacted by sending envoys to ask why he was under attack, since hostages had been given. To this, Corbulo reiterated the demand to seek the recognition of his crown from Nero. Eventually, the two sides agreed on a meeting. Tiridates announced that he would bring 1,000 men to the meeting, implying that Corbulo should bring the same number of men "in peaceful fashion, without breastplates and helmets". Tacitus suggests that Tiridates intended to overwhelm the Romans, as the Parthian cavalry would be superior to an equal number of Roman infantry in any case. At any rate, in a show of force, Corbulo decided to take with him the larger part of his force, not only IV Ferrata, but also 3,000 men from III Gallica plus the auxiliaries. Tiridates also appeared at the agreed site, but, seeing the Romans in full battle array, and in turn distrusting their intentions, he did not come closer and withdrew during the night. Tiridates then resorted to a tactic that had worked well a century earlier against Mark Antony: he sent forces to raid the Roman army's supply route, which stretched over the mountains back to Trapezus in the Black Sea. They failed, however, since the Romans had taken care to secure the mountain routes by a series of forts.

=== Fall of Artaxata ===
Operations during the first two years of the war: Corbulo's invasion and conquest of Armenia.

Corbulo now resolved to directly attack Tiridates' fortified strongholds. Not only were they instrumental in controlling the surrounding country and sources of revenue and soldiers, but in addition, a threat to them might force Tiridates to risk a pitched battle, since, in the words of historian A. Goldsworthy, "a king who could not defend communities loyal to him [...] lost prestige." Corbulo and his subordinates successfully stormed three of these forts, including Volandum (possibly modern Iğdır), "the strongest of all in that province" according to Tacitus, within a day with minimal casualties, and massacred their garrisons. Terrified by this display of Roman might, several towns and villages surrendered, and the Romans prepared to move against the northern Armenian capital, Artaxata.

This forced Tiridates to confront the Romans with his army, as they approached Artaxata. The Roman force, reinforced by a vexillatio of X Fretensis, marched in a hollow square, with the legions supported by auxiliary horsemen and foot archers. The Roman soldiers were under strict orders not to break formation, and despite repeated probing attacks and feigned retreats by the Parthian horse archers, they held together until nightfall. During the night, Tiridates withdrew his army, abandoning his capital; its inhabitants promptly surrendered and were allowed to leave unmolested, but the city was torched, since the Romans could not spare sufficient men for garrisoning it.

=== Fall of Tigranocerta ===
In 59, the Romans marched to the south, towards Tigranocerta, Armenia's second capital city. On their way, Corbulo's men punished those who withstood or hid from them, while leniency was shown to those who surrendered. In the harsh, dry terrain of northern Mesopotamia, the army suffered from lack of provisions, especially water, until they reached the more fertile areas near Tigranocerta. During that time, a plot to murder Corbulo was uncovered and suppressed. Several Armenian nobles who had joined the Roman camp were implicated and executed. According to a story provided by Frontinus, when the Roman army arrived at Tigranocerta, they launched the severed head of one of the conspirators into the city. By chance, it landed right where the city council was assembled; they immediately decided to surrender the city, which was consequently spared. Shortly after, an attempt by the Parthian army under king Vologases to enter Armenia was blocked by Verulanus Severus, the commander of the auxiliaries.

The Romans were now in control of Armenia, and they promptly installed its new king, Tigranes VI, the last descendant of the Cappadocian royal house, in Tigranocerta. Some outlying western parts of Armenia were also ceded to the Roman vassals. Corbulo left 1,000 legionaries, three auxiliary cohorts and two cavalry alae (ca. 3-4,000 men) behind to support the new monarch, and retired with the rest of his army to Syria, the governorship of which he now (in 60 AD) assumed as a reward for his success.

== Parthian counterattack ==
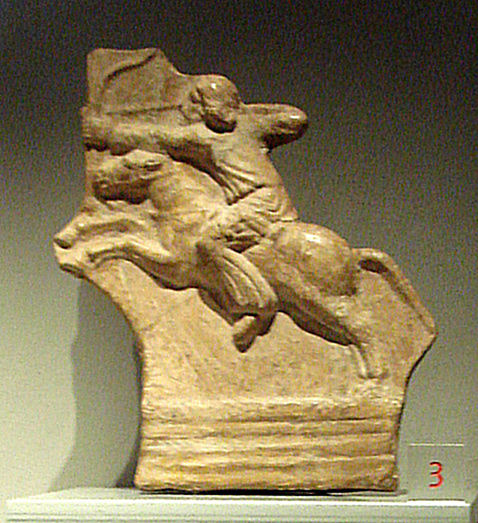
Relief depicting a Parthian horse-archer. Highly skilled and mobile, they formed the backbone of the Parthian army. In combination with the heavy cataphract cavalry they formed a very effective force that had already annihilated a Roman army at Carrhae.

The Romans were well aware that their victory was still fragile, and that as soon as the Parthian king had dealt with the Hyrcanian rebellion, he would turn his attention to Armenia. Despite Vologases' reluctance to risk an all-out conflict with Rome, in the end, he was forced to act when Tigranes raided the Parthian province of Adiabene in 61. The enraged protests of its governor Monobazus, and his pleas for protection, could not be ignored by Vologases, whose prestige and royal authority were at stake. Vologases therefore hastily concluded a treaty with the Hyrcanians so as to be free to campaign against Rome, and called an assembly of the grandees of his realm. There he publicly reaffirmed Tiridates' position as king of Armenia by crowning him with a diadem. In order to reinstall his brother on the Armenian throne, the Parthian king assembled a force of picked cavalry under Monaeses, complemented by infantry from Adiabene.

In response, Corbulo sent the legions IV Scythica and XII Fulminata to Armenia, while he detailed the three other legions under his command (III Gallica, VI Ferrata and XV Apollinaris) to fortify the line of the river Euphrates, fearing that the Parthians might invade Syria. At the same time, he petitioned Nero to appoint a separate legate for Cappadocia, with the responsibility for conducting the war in Armenia.

=== Parthian siege of Tigranocerta ===
Monaeses meanwhile entered Armenia and approached Tigranocerta. Tigranes had taken care to gather supplies, and the city was well-fortified and garrisoned with Romans and Armenians alike. The siege was largely undertaken by the Adiabenian contingent, since the Parthians, being cavalrymen, were unskilled and unwilling to engage in siegework. The Parthian assault failed, and was driven back with losses by a successful Roman sally. At this point, Corbulo sent an envoy to Vologases, who had encamped with his court at Nisibis, near Tigranocerta and the Roman–Parthian border. The failed siege and a shortage of fodder for his cavalry forced Vologases to agree to withdraw Monaeses from Armenia. At the same time, however, the Romans also left Armenia, which, according to Tacitus, raised suspicions as to Corbulo's motives: some whispered that he had reached an agreement of mutual withdrawal with the Parthians, and that he was unwilling to risk his reputation by renewing hostilities against them. At any rate, a truce was arranged and a Parthian embassy was dispatched to Rome. The negotiations failed to reach an agreement, and war was resumed in the spring of 62.

In the meantime, the new governor (proconsul) of Cappadocia had arrived, in the person of Lucius Caesennius Paetus, the consul of the previous year (61 AD). The army was divided between him and Corbulo, with IV Scythica, XII Fulminata, the newly arrived V Macedonica and the auxiliaries from Pontus, Galatia, and Cappadocia going to Paetus, while Corbulo retained III Gallica, VI Ferrata and X Fretensis. Because of their competition for glory, the relations between the two Roman commanders were strained from the beginning. It is notable that Corbulo kept the legions with which he had spent the past few years campaigning, and gave his colleague--who, after all, was expected to conduct the main campaign--the more inexperienced units. The total Roman force arrayed against the Parthians was nevertheless considerable: the six legions alone totaled some 30,000 men. The exact number and disposition of auxiliary units is unclear, but there were seven cavalry alae and seven infantry cohorts in Syria alone, comprising a force of 7-9,000 troops.

=== Battle of Rhandeia ===
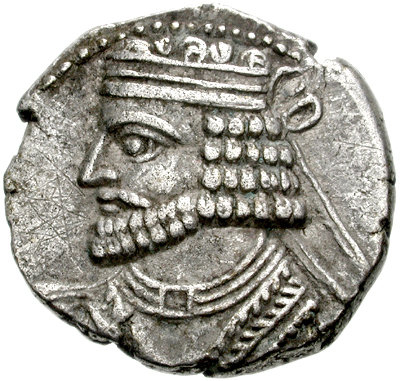
Silver coin of Vologases I, King of Parthia.

Paetus nonetheless appeared confident of victory, and followed the Parthian declaration of war and capture of Tigranocerta with his own invasion of Armenia, while Corbulo remained at Syria, further strengthening the fortifications in the Euphrates frontier. Paetus had only two legions with him, IV Scythica and XII Fulminata, and advanced towards Tigranocerta. A few minor forts were taken, but a lack of supplies forced him to withdraw westwards for the winter.

The Parthians had originally intended to invade Syria, but Corbulo put on a convincing display of military might, building a strong flotilla of ships equipped with catapults and a bridge over the Euphrates, which allowed him to establish a foothold on the Parthian shore. Therefore, the Parthians abandoned their plans for Syria, and turned their attention towards Armenia. There, Paetus had dispersed his forces and granted extended leaves to his officers, so that he was taken unawares at the Parthian advance. Upon learning of it, he initially advanced to meet Vologases, but after a reconnaissance detachment was defeated, he panicked and withdrew hastily. Paetus sent his wife and son to safety in the fortress of Arsamosata, and tried to block the Parthian advance by occupying the passes of the Taurus Mountains with detachments from his army. In so doing, however, he further dispersed his forces, which were then defeated in detail by the Parthians. Roman morale plunged and panic set in among the army, which was now besieged in a series of hastily erected camps near Rhandeia. Paetus, who appears to have fallen into desperate inactivity, sent urgent messages to Corbulo to come to his rescue.

Operations during the final years of the war: the raids of Tigranes into Parthian territory provoked a Parthian counterattack, which culminated in the surrender of the Roman army of L. Caesennius Paetus.

Corbulo in the meantime had been aware of the danger faced by his colleague, and put part of his forces on standby, but he did not march to join Paetus, and some accused him of delaying in order to reap more glory from rescuing him. Nevertheless, when the calls for assistance arrived, he responded quickly and marched forth with half of the Syrian army, carrying many provisions laden on camels. He soon met dispersed men of Paetus' army, and managed to rally them around his force. But before he could arrive to the rescue, Paetus had capitulated: the Parthians, aware that relief was nearing, increasingly harassed the Romans, until Paetus was forced to send a letter to Vologases to seek terms. The subsequent treaty was humiliating: not only would the Romans leave Armenia and surrender all forts they held, but they also agreed to build a bridge over the nearby Arsanias river over which Vologases could pass in triumph, sitting atop an elephant. In addition, the Roman army was liberally plundered by the Armenians, who took even the Romans' weapons and clothes without facing any resistance. Still worse, according to rumors reported by Tacitus, the Romans were made to pass under the yoke, a gesture of ultimate humiliation in Roman eyes.

The two Roman forces met on the banks of the Euphrates near Melitene, amidst scenes of mutual grief; while Corbulo lamented the undoing of his achievements, Paetus tried to convince him to attempt to reverse the situation by invading Armenia. Corbulo, however, refused, claiming that he did not have the authority to do so, and that either way the army was too worn out to be able to campaign effectively. In the end, Paetus retired to Cappadocia and Corbulo to Syria, where he received envoys from Vologases, who demanded that he evacuate his bridgehead over the Euphrates. In turn, Corbulo demanded the Parthian evacuation of Armenia. Vologases agreed to this, and both sides withdrew their forces, leaving Armenia once again masterless but de facto under Parthian control, until a Parthian delegation could travel to Rome.

== Corbulo's return and peace settlement ==
Rome, meanwhile, appears to have been largely unaware of the real situation in Armenia. Tacitus acidly records that "trophies for the Parthian war and arches were erected in the center of the Capitoline hill" by decree of the Senate, even while the war was not yet decided. Whatever illusions the Roman leadership had, they were shattered by the arrival of the Parthian delegation to Rome in the spring of 63. Their demands, and the subsequent interrogation of the centurion who accompanied them, revealed to Nero and the Senate the true extent of the disaster, which Paetus had concealed in his dispatches. Nevertheless, in the words of Tacitus, the Romans decided to "accept a dangerous war over a disgraceful peace"; Paetus was recalled, and Corbulo placed again in charge of the campaign into Armenia, with extraordinary imperium which placed him above all other governors and client rulers in the East. Corbulo's post as governor of Syria was entrusted to Gaius Cestius Gallus.

Corbulo reordered his forces, withdrawing the defeated and demoralized IV Scythica and XII Fulminata legions to Syria, leaving X Fretensis to guard Cappadocia, and leading his veteran III Gallica and VI Ferrata to Melitene, where the invasion army was to be assembled. To these he also added V Macedonica, which had remained in Pontus throughout the previous year and not been tainted by the defeat, the newly arrived XV Apollinaris, and large numbers of auxiliaries and contingents of the client kings.

After his army crossed the Euphrates, following a route opened up by Lucullus over a hundred years before, he received envoys from Tiridates and Vologases. At the approach of such a large force, and aware of Corbulo's ability as a general, the two Arsacids were anxious to negotiate. Indeed, Corbulo, no doubt on instructions from Nero, reiterated the old Roman position: if Tiridates would accept his crown from Rome, then renewed war could be averted. Tiridates readily agreed to negotiations, and Rhandeia, the scene of last year's Roman defeat, was agreed upon as a meeting place. To the Armenians, this place was intended as a reminder of their strength, while Corbulo agreed to it because there he hoped to expunge the earlier disgrace, by peace or war. Once there, Corbulo put Paetus' son, who served under him as a legate, in charge of a party that was to gather the remains of the Roman soldiers and ensure them a proper burial. On the agreed day, both Tiridates and Corbulo, each accompanied by 20 horsemen, met between the two camps. Tiridates agreed to travel to Rome and seek confirmation of his crown from Nero. In sign of this agreement, a few days later, both armies put on a display, arrayed in full parade gear. Tiridates approached the Roman camp, where a statue of the Emperor Nero had been erected upon a raised platform, and placed his royal diadem at its feet in submission.

== Aftermath ==
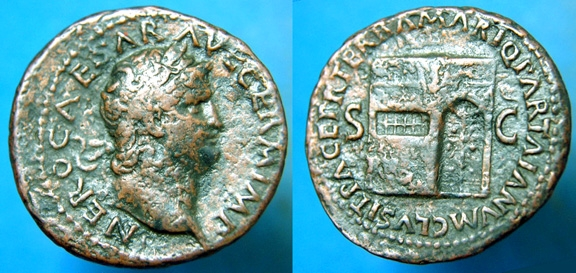
Celebratory as struck in 66, showing the gates of the Temple of Janus closed as a symbol of universal peace. It would not last long: in the same year, the Jewish Revolt broke out, and many of the units involved in the Armenian War would be deployed against the Jewish rebels.

In 66, Tiridates visited Rome to receive his crown and was lavishly received by Nero, who used the occasion to boost his own popularity. He ordered the gates of the Temple of Janus to be shut, thus declaring that peace reigned throughout the Roman Empire.

Nero celebrated this peace as a major achievement: he was hailed as imperator and held a triumph, although no new territory had been won, and the peace reflected a compromise rather than a true victory. For although Rome could prevail militarily in Armenia, politically, she had no genuine alternatives to the Arsacid candidacy on offer for the Armenian throne. Armenia would henceforth be ruled by an Iranian dynasty, and despite its nominal allegiance to Rome, it would come under increasing Parthian influence. In the judgment of later generations, "Nero had lost Armenia", and although the Peace of Rhandeia ushered in a period of relatively peaceful relations that would last for 50 years, Armenia would continue to be a constant bone of contention between the Romans, the Parthians, and their Sassanid successors. For the short term however, the peace that Nero secured was kept by both sides, even while the bulk of Rome's eastern forces was involved in the suppression of the Jewish Revolt.

As for Corbulo, he was honoured by Nero as the man who had brought this "triumph" to be, but his popularity and influence with the army made him a potential rival. Together with the involvement of his son-in-law Lucius Annius Vinicianus in a foiled plot against Nero in 66, Corbulo became suspect in the eyes of the emperor. In 67, while journeying in Greece, Nero ordered him to be executed; upon hearing of this, Corbulo committed suicide.

The war had also demonstrated to the Romans that the defensive system in the East, as put in place by Augustus, was no longer adequate. Thus the following years saw a major reorganization of the Roman East: the client kingdoms of Pontus and Colchis (in 64 AD), Cilicia, Commagene and Lesser Armenia (in 72 AD) were made into Roman provinces, the number of legions in the area increased, and Roman presence in the Caucasian client states of Iberia and Albania strengthened, with the aim of strategically encircling Armenia. Direct Roman control was extended to the entire line of the Euphrates, marking the beginning of the Eastern limes that would survive until the Muslim conquests of the 7th century.

== Sources ==
=== Primary sources ===
- Tacitus, Annales. Translation based on Alfred John Church and William Jackson Brodribb (1876).
- Cassius Dio, Historia Romana. Loeb Classical Library edition (1925)

=== Secondary sources ===
- Bivar, A.D.H. (1983). "The Political History of Iran Under the Arsacids". In Yarshater, Ehsan (ed.). The Cambridge History of Iran: The Seleucid, Parthian and Sasanian Periods. Vol. 3(1). Cambridge: Cambridge University Press. pp. 21–99. ISBN 0-521-20092-X.
- Bournoutian, George A. (2006). A Concise History of the Armenian People: From Ancient Times to the Present (5 ed.). Costa Mesa, California: Mazda Publishers, Inc. ISBN 978-1568591414.
- Farrokh, Kaveh; Frye, Richard Nelson (2007). "Parthia from Mark Antony to the Alan Invasions". Shadows in the Desert: Ancient Persia at War. Bloomsbury USA. ISBN 978-1-84603-108-3.
- Goldsworthy, Adrian (2007). "Imperial legate: Corbulo and Armenia". In the Name of Rome: The Men Who Won the Roman Empire. Phoenix. ISBN 978-0-7538-1789-6.
- Marciak, Michał (2017). Sophene, Gordyene, and Adiabene: Three Regna Minora of Northern Mesopotamia Between East and West. BRILL. pp. 359–360. ISBN 978-90-04-35072-4.
- Sartre, Maurice (2005). The Middle East Under Rome. Translated by Porter, Catherine; Rawlings, Elizabeth. Harvard University Press. ISBN 978-0-674-01683-5.
- Shotter, David Colin Arthur (2005). Nero. Lancaster pamphlets in ancient history (2nd ed.). London: Routledge. ISBN 978-0-415-31942-3.
- Southern, Pat (2007). The Roman army: a social and institutional history. Oxford: Oxford university press. ISBN 978-0-19-532878-3.
- Wheeler, Everett L. (2007). "The Army and the Limes in the East". In Erdkamp, Paul (ed.). A Companion to the Roman Army. Blackwell companions to the ancient world (1 ed.). Malden (MA): Wiley. pp. 235–266. doi:10.1002/9780470996577.ch15. ISBN 978-1-4051-2153-8. OCLC 65197913.
