= Tiridates I of Armenia =

King of Armenia from 52 to 58 and 62 to 88

Tiridates I
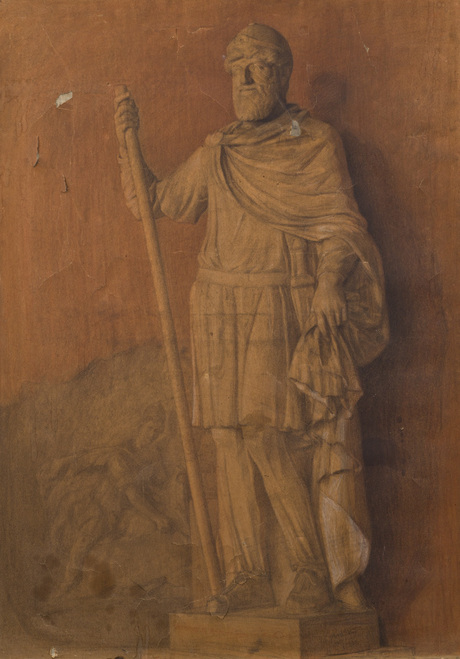
- A painting of the statue of Tiridates I in the Louvre Museum by Panos Terlemezian

King of Armenia
- 1st Reign: 52–58
- Predecessor: Rhadamistus
- Successor: Tigranes VI
- 2nd Reign: 62–88
- Coronation: 66, in Rome by Nero
- Predecessor: Tigranes VI
- Successor: Sanatruk
- Died: 88
- Dynasty: Arsacid dynasty
- Father: Vonones II
- Religion: Zoroastrianism

Tiridates I (Parthian: 𐭕𐭉𐭓𐭉𐭃𐭕, Tīridāt; Ancient Greek: Τιριδάτης, Tiridátes) was King of Armenia beginning in 53 AD and the founder of the Arsacid dynasty of Armenia. The dates of his birth and death are unknown. His early reign was marked by a brief interruption towards the end of the year 54 and a much longer one from 58 to 63. In an agreement to resolve the Roman–Parthian conflict in and over Armenia, Tiridates I, who was one of the brothers of Vologases I of Parthia, was crowned king of Armenia by the Roman emperor Nero in 66; in the future, the king of Armenia was to be a Parthian prince, but his appointment required approval from the Romans. Even though this made Armenia a client kingdom, various contemporary Roman sources thought that Nero had de facto ceded Armenia to the Parthian Empire.

In addition to being king, Tiridates I was also a Zoroastrian priest and was accompanied by other magi on his journey to Rome in 66. In the early 20th century, Franz Cumont speculated that Tiridates was instrumental in the development of Mithraism which ultimately became the main religion of the Roman Army and spread across the whole empire. Furthermore, during his reign, he started reforming the administrative structure of Armenia, a reform which was continued by his successors, and which brought many Iranian customs and offices into it.

== Background ==
Tiridates was the youngest son of Vonones II, who was king of Media Atropatene, and then later the Parthian Empire. Tiridates had two elder brothers named Pacorus (the eldest) and Vologases. Tiridates' name means "given by Tir". Tir is the Zoroastrian angel (Yazad) of literature, science and art based on the Avestan Tishtrya and was equated with the Greek Apollo by way of the process of interpretatio graeca.

== Accession ==
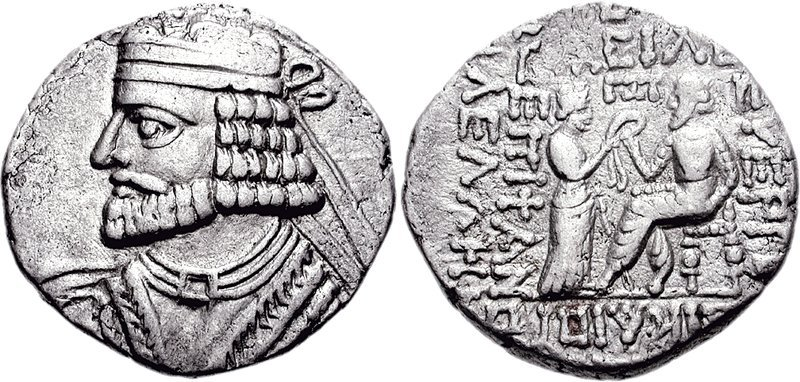
Coin of Tiridates' brother Vologases I

In 51 the Roman procurator of Cappadocia, Julius Paelignus, invaded Armenia and ravaged the country, then under an Iberian usurper Rhadamistus. Rhadamistus had killed his uncle Mithridates, the legitimate king of Armenia, by luring the Roman garrison that was protecting him outside of the fortress of Gornea. Acting without instruction, Paelignus recognized Rhadamistus as the new king of Armenia. Syrian governor Ummidius Quadratus sent Helvidius Priscus with a legion to repair these outrages, but he was recalled so as not to provoke a war with Parthia.

Vonones II died in the same year, and was succeeded by Vologases I. Vologases I sought to continue the policies of the prominent former Parthian king Artabanus II (r. 12–38/41), and thus, one of his first objectives was to bolster the Parthian position in strategically and politically unstable regions that had served for decades as the source of war with the Romans. Thus he gave the kingship of Media Atropatene to Pacorus, and in 52 took the opportunity to invade Armenia, conquering Artaxata and proclaiming Tiridates I as king. Vologases felt his invasion was justified due to the recent usurpation of the Armenian throne by the Iberian prince Rhadamistus, which he saw as a violation of the former settlement made between the Parthians and Romans regarding Armenia.

A winter epidemic as well as an insurrection initiated by his son Vardanes forced him to withdraw his troops from Armenia, allowing Rhadamistus to come back and punish locals as traitors; they eventually revolted and replaced him with the prince Tiridates I in early 55. Rhadamistus escaped along with his wife Zenobia who was pregnant. Unable to continue fleeing, she asked her husband to end her life rather than be captured. Rhadamistus stabbed her with a Median dagger and flung her body into the river Araxes. Zenobia was not fatally injured and was recovered by shepherds who sent her to Tiridates. Tiridates I received her kindly and treated her as a member of the monarchy. Rhadamistus himself returned to Iberia and was soon put to death by his father Pharasmanes I of Iberia for having plotted against the royal power.

== War with Rome ==
Armenia and the Roman East in ca. 50 AD, before the outbreak of the war.

Unhappy with the growing Parthian influence at their doorstep, Nero sent the Roman general Gnaeus Domitius Corbulo with a large army to the east in order to restore Roman client kings. A Hasmonean named Aristobulus was given Lesser Armenia (Nicopolis and Satala) and Sohaemus of Emesa received Armenia Sophene. In the spring of 58, Corbulo entered Greater Armenia from Cappadocia and advanced towards Artaxata, while Parasmanes I of Iberia attacked from the north, and Antiochus IV of Commagene attacked from the southwest. Supported by his brother, Tiridates I sent flying columns to raid the Romans far and wide. Corbulo retaliated using the same tactics and the use of the Moschoi tribes who raided outlying regions of Armenia. Tiridates I fled from the capital, and Corbulo burned Artaxata to the ground. In the summer, Corbulo began moving towards Tigranocerta through rough terrain and passing through the Taronitida (Taron), where several of his commanders died in an ambush by the Armenian resistance; however, the city opened its doors, with the exception of one of the citadels, which was destroyed in the ensuing assault. By this time the majority of Armenians had abandoned resistance and accepted the prince favored by Rome.

Nero gave the crown to the last royal descendant of the kings of Cappadocia, the grandson of Glaphyra (daughter of Archelaus of Cappadocia) and Alexander of Judea (the brother of Herod Archelaus and the son of Herod the Great), who assumed the Armenian name Tigranes (his uncle was Tigranes V). His son, named Gaius Julius Alexander, married Iotapa, the daughter of Antiochus IV of Commagene and was made King of Cilicia. Nero was hailed vigorously in public for this initial victory and Corbulo was appointed governor of Syria as a reward. A guard of 1000 legionary soldiers, three auxiliary cohorts and two wings of horses were allotted to Tigranes in order to defend the country. Border districts were bestowed to Roman allies that assisted Corbulo including Polemon, Parasmanes, Aristobolus and Antiochus.

Vologases I was infuriated by the fact that an alien now sat on the Armenian throne, but hesitated to reinstate his brother as he was engaged in a conflict with the Hyrcanians who were revolting. Tigranes invaded the Kingdom of Adiabene and deposed its King Monobazes in 61, who was a vassal of Parthians.

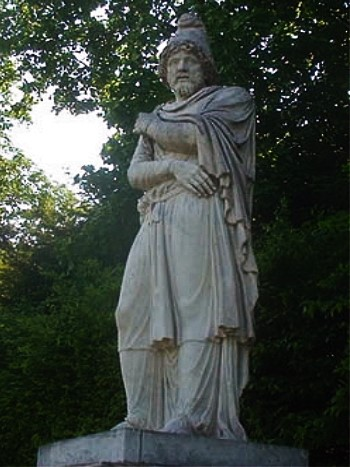
Statue of Tiridates I

Vologases I considered this an act of aggression from Rome and started a campaign to restore Tiridates I to the Armenian throne. He placed a well-disciplined force of cataphracts along with Adiabenian auxiliaries under the command of spahbod Moneses and ordered him to expel Tigranes from Armenia. Having quelled the Hyrcanian revolt, Vologases I gathered the strength of his dominions and embarked toward Armenia. Corbulo, having been informed of the impending attack, sent two legions under the commands of Verulanus Severus and Marcus Vettius Bolanus to the assistance of Tigranes with secret directions that they should act with caution rather than vigour. He also dispatched a message to Nero, urging him to send a second commander with the explicit purpose of defending Armenia as Syria was now also in peril. Corbulo placed the remainder of the legions on the banks of the Euphrates and armed irregular troops of the nearby provinces. Since the region was deficient in water, he erected forts over the fountains and concealed the rivulets by heaping sand over them.

Moneses marched towards Tigranocerta but failed to break the defense of the city walls as his troops were unfit for a long siege. Corbulo, although eminently successful thought it prudent to use his good fortune with moderation. He sent a Roman centurion by the name of Casperius to the camp of Vologases I in Nisibis located 60 kilometres (37 mi) from Tigranocerta with the demand to raise the siege. Because of a recent locust storm and the scarcity of fodder for his horses Vologases I agreed to raise the siege of Tigranocerta and petitioned to be granted Armenia in order to achieve a firm peace. Vologases I demanded that both the Roman and Parthian troops should evacuate Armenia, that Tigranes should be dethroned, and that the position of Tiridates I be recognized. The Roman government declined to accede to these arrangements and sent Lucius Caesennius Paetus, governor of Cappadocia, to settle the question by bringing Armenia under direct Roman administration.

Paetus was an incapable commander and suffered a humiliating defeat at the Battle of Rhandeia in 62, losing the legions of XII Fulminata commanded by Calvisius Sabinus and IV Scythica commanded by Lucius Funisulanus Vettonianus. The command of the troops was returned to Corbulo, who the following year led a strong army into Melitene and beyond into Armenia, eliminating all of the regional governors he suspected were pro-Parthian. Finally in Rhandeia, Corbulo and Tiridates I met to make a peace agreement. The location of Rhandeia suited both Tiridates I and Corbulo. It appealed to Tiridates I because that is where his army had beaten the Romans and sent them away under a capitulation; on the other hand, it appealed to Corbulo because he was about to wipe out the ill repute earned before in the same location. When Tiridates I arrived at the Roman camp he took off his royal diadem and placed it on the ground near a statue of Nero, agreeing to receive it back only from Nero in Rome. Tiridates I was recognized as the vassal king of Armenia; a Roman garrison would remain in the country permanently, in Sophene while Artaxata would be reconstructed. Corbulo left his son-in-law Lucius Annius Vinicianus to accompany Tiridates I to Rome in order to attest his own fidelity to Nero.

== Visiting Rome ==
Prior to embarking for Rome in 66 AD, Tiridates I visited his mother and two brothers in Media Atropatene and Parthia. On his long trek he was accompanied by his wife and children and two of his brothers. His escort included an imposing retinue, comprising many feudal lords, several sages, 3,000 Parthian horsemen, and also a large number of Romans. Tiridates did not travel through sea, as he did not wish to pollute water, one of the seven Zoroastrian holy aspects. His route lay across Thrace, through Illyria, on the eastern shores of the Adriatic and Picenum, in northeastern Italy. The journey took nine months, and Tiridates I rode on horseback, with his children and queen at his side. The children of Vologases, Monobazes and Pacorus also accompanied Tiridates I.

Cassius Dio, a second-century Roman historian, described Tiridates I favorably at the time of his arrival: "Tiridates himself was in the prime of his life, a notable figure by reason of his youth, beauty, family, and intelligence." Nero greeted Tiridates I at Neapolis (Naples) in October, sending a state chariot to carry the visitor over the last few kilometres.

According to Dio's account, Tiridates I refused to remove his sword as he approached the ruler of the Roman Empire (though as a compromise, he agreed to have his sword firmly fastened in the sheath, so that it could not be drawn). Nero was reportedly so impressed by this act that he ordered a gladiatorial games be staged in honor of his guest at Puteolis (present day Pozzuoli, near Naples). According to Cassius Dio, the Armenian king himself had an opportunity to display his ability as a marksman by shooting an arrow through the bodies of two buffaloes. Ethiopian women, men and children fought as gladiators and gladiatrices at the games to impress the Armenian king.

The climax of the ceremonies was reserved for the capital. Rome was decorated with flags, torches, garlands and bunting, and was illuminated at night with crowds of people seen everywhere.

Ancient Roman statue formerly identified with Tiridates I. Louvre Museum

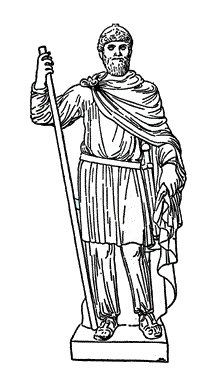
A drawing of the statue

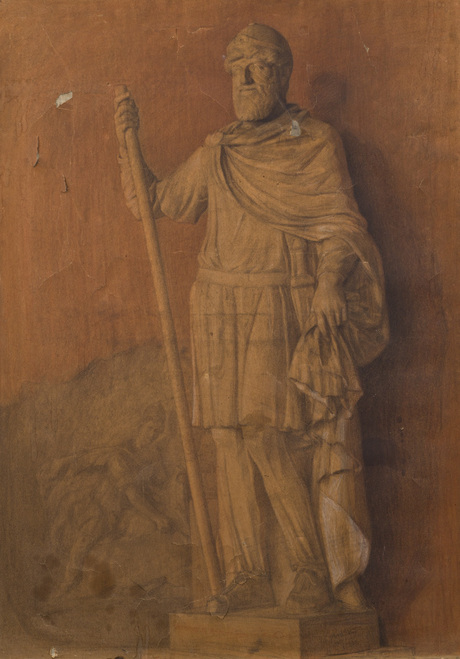
A painting of the statue by Panos Terlemezian

On the day after Tiridates I's arrival, Nero came to the Forum clothed in triumphal vestments and surrounded by dignitaries and soldiers, all resplendent in expensive attire and glittering armor. While Nero sat on the imperial throne, Tiridates I and his retinue advanced between two lines of soldiers. Arriving in front of the dais, Tiridates I knelt, with hands clasped on his breast. After the thundering shouts and acclamations excited by this spectacle had subsided, Tiridates I addressed the emperor:

My Lord, I am a descendant of Arsakes and the brother of the Kings Vologases and Pacorus. I have come to you who are my god; I have worshipped you as the [sun]; (Note: Edward Champlin notes: "When Nero entered with the senators and the guard, he ascended the Rostra and sat in his chair of state, looking back down the Forum in an east-southeasterly direction. That is, as Tiridates I approached him through the ranks of soldiers, the rising sun would have hit Nero full on the face, in all his triumphal splendor. The prince then addressed the emperor from the ground, looking up to him on the Rostra: "I have come to you, my god, worshipping you as I do Mithra." The important point—something Nero would know as an initiate, whether others did or not—is that for Zoroastrians the sun was the eye of Mithra, and Mithra was often so closely associated with the sun as to be identified with it: "the Sun whom they call Mithres," as Strabo puts it. Moreover, when Zoroastrians prayed in the open air, they turned toward the sun, since their religion bound them to pray facing fire. Thus, when Tiridates I stood in the open Roman Forum facing the sunlit emperor, and worshipping him as he did Mithra, he was in essence worshipping the sun. An ex-praetor translated his words and proclaimed them to the crowd. At this stage in Rome's history, very few of those present would have known who Mithra was, but there is a good likelihood that the interpreter relayed Tiridates' words as "I have come to you, my god, worshipping you as I do the Sun." For Nero, the marriage of Roman triumph and Parthian ceremony culminated in a splendid theatrical affirmation of his role as the new god of the Sun.") I shall be whatever you would order me to be, because you are my destiny and fortune.

To which Nero replied:

You have done well by coming here to enjoy my presence in person. What your father has not left to you and what your brothers did not preserve for you, I do accord to you, and I make you King of Armenia, so that you, as well as they, may know that I have the power to take away and to grant kingdoms.

Tiridates I then mounted the steps of the platform and knelt, while Nero placed the royal diadem on his head. As the young king was about to kneel a second time, Nero lifted him by his right hand and after kissing him, made him sit at his side on a chair a little lower than his own. Meanwhile, the populace gave tumultuous ovations to both rulers. A Praetor, speaking to the audience, interpreted and explained the words of Tiridates, who spoke in Greek. According to Pliny the Elder, Tiridates I then introduced Nero to magian feasts (magicis cenis). Tacitus claimed that Tiridates I was also interested in all things Roman.

Public festivities continued for some time after the coronation ceremony. The interior of the Theatre of Pompey and every piece of its furniture was entirely gilded for the occasion; for this reason, Rome thenceforth recalled that date as "the Golden Day." Daytime festivities were on a scale no less lavish than those of the night: Royal purple awnings stretched as protection against the heat of the sun. Nero, clad in green and wearing a chariot driver's headdress, took part in a chariot race. At the evening banquets, Nero, in gold-embroidered vestments, sang and played the lyre with zither accompaniment. Tiridates I was amazed and disgusted by Nero's extravagance, but he had only praise for Corbulo and expressed to Corbulo his surprise at his serving such a master. He made no concealment of his views to Nero's face and said to him sarcastically: "Sire, you have a wonderful servant in the person of Corbulo."

In memory of these events, the Senate honored Nero with the laurel wreath and the title of Imperator, or commander-in-chief of the armies. No reception comparable to this in magnitude and splendor is recorded in the history of Rome. Besides the enormous sum spent in festivities, the Roman Government bore the entire cost of the journey of Tiridates I and his retinue, both from and to their homeland. Nero also made a gift to Tiridates I of fifty million sesterces.

=== Three Magi theory ===
It has been suggested that the visit of Tiridates I, an event that greatly impressed contemporaries, was adapted by Christians to become the story of the adoration of the Christ Child by the Three Magi. The Christian legend changed Rome into Bethlehem, the birthplace of the Ruler of the coming Kingdom of God, and replaced Tiridates I with that contemporary king who was already connected with Christianity through the Acts of St. Thomas: Gondophares, otherwise known as Kaspar.

== Peace with Rome ==
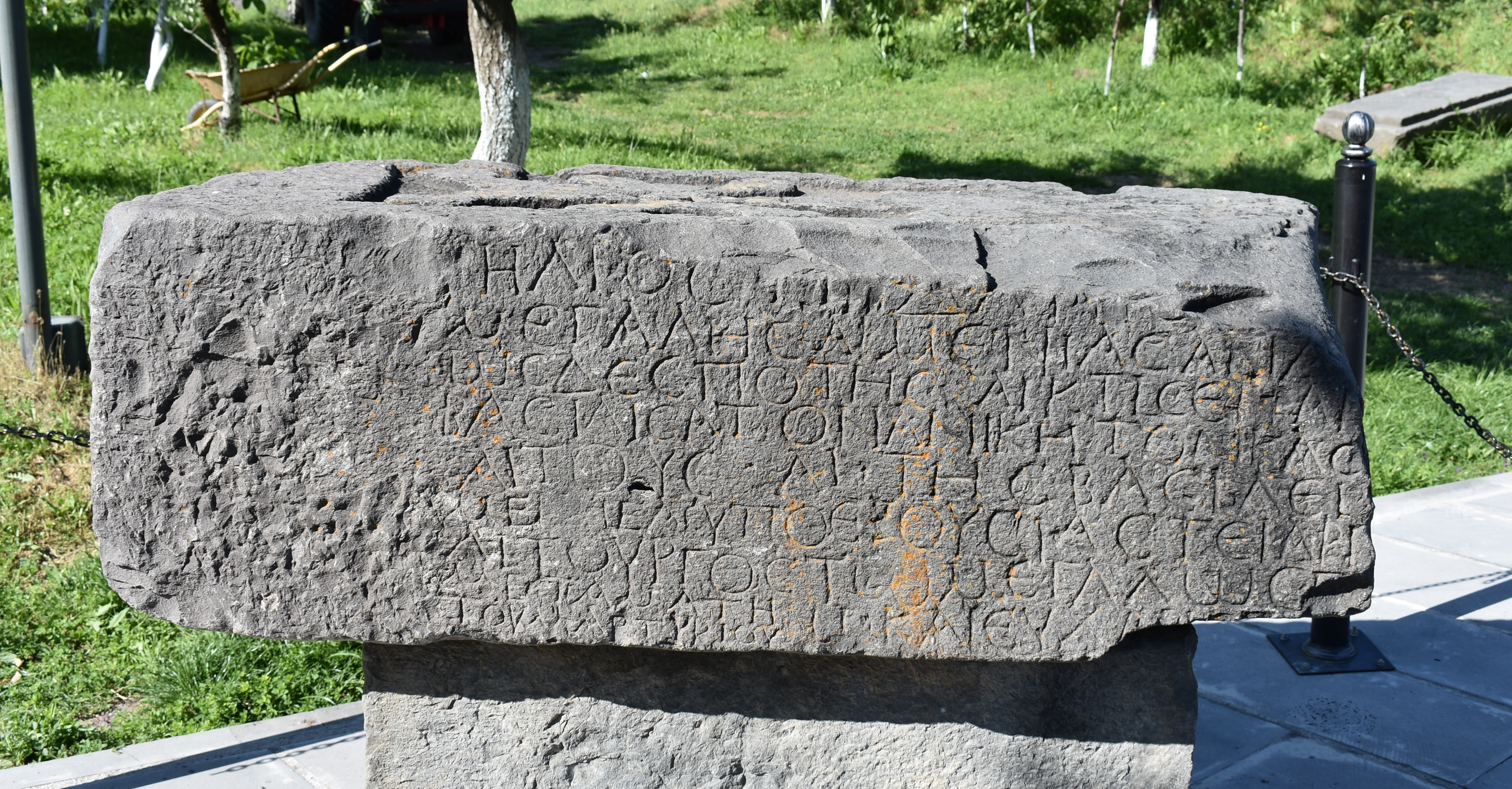
Greek inscription attributed to Tiridates I on basalt rock from the fortress of Garni, within the grounds of the Garni Temple complex.

Nero closed the gates of the Temple of Janus in the Roman Forum, which were never shut save in times of universal peace, claiming that peace prevailed at the time throughout the Roman world. This was a considerable victory for Nero politically, and he became very popular in the eastern provinces of Rome and with the Armenians and Parthians. The immediate dividend of the peace was Rome's ability to divert legions from Syria to Judea, which broke into open warfare culminating in the First Jewish–Roman War just one year after Tiridates' coronation. The peace between Parthia and Rome lasted 50 years, until the emperor Trajan invaded Armenia in 114.

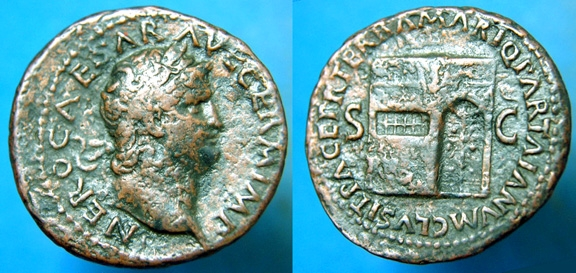
Roman coin struck in 66 under Nero's reign depicting the gates of the Temple of Janus closed.

When Tiridates I returned to Armenia, he took with him a great number of skilled artisans for the reconstruction of Artaxata which he renamed "Neronia" in honor of the emperor. He also embellished the royal residence at nearby Garni with colonnades and monuments of dazzling richness, and added a new temple. Trade between the two continents also grew, allowing Armenia to secure its independence from Rome. Rome now counted upon Armenia as a loyal ally, even after Nero's death and through the entire duration of Vespasian's rule in the East.

== Armenian-Alanian war (72) ==
In 72 the Alans raid, a warlike nomadic Sarmatian tribe, made an incursion into Media Atropatene as well as various districts of northern Armenia. Tiridates I and his brother Pacorus, King of Media Atropatene, faced them at a number of battles, during one of which Tiridates I was briefly captured, narrowly escaping being taken alive. He was lassoed from a distance and caught, but he quickly managed to whip out his sword and slash the rope in time. The Alans withdrew with a lot of booty after plundering Armenia and Media Atropatene. The King of Iberia asked for protection against the Alans from Vespasian, who helped reconstruct the fortress of Harmozica around the Iberian capital Mtskheta, near modern Tbilisi. An Aramaic inscription found near Tbilisi indicates that Tiridates I also warred with Iberia during his final years. The exact date of the end of Tiridates I's reign is unknown; various sources name Sanatruk as his successor.

The name of Legio XII Fulminata discovered carved on a mountain in Gobustan (in modern Azerbaijan), attests to the presence of Roman soldiers by the shores of the Caspian Sea in 89, farther east than any previously known Roman inscription.

It is known that Tiridates' great-nephew, Axidares, the son of Pacorus II, was King of Armenia by 110.

== Cultural depictions ==
Tiridates I is one of the principal characters in George Frideric Handel's opera Radamisto and Reinhard Keiser's opera Octavia.

== Bibliography ==
=== Ancient works ===
- Cassius Dio, Roman History
- Tacitus, Annals

=== Modern works ===
- Alemany, Agustí (2000). Sources on the Alans: A Critical Compilation. Brill. ISBN 978-9004114425.
- Bivar, A.D.H. (1983). "The Political History of Iran Under the Arsacids". In Yarshater, Ehsan (ed.). The Cambridge History of Iran: The Seleucid, Parthian and Sasanian Periods. Vol. 3(1). Cambridge: Cambridge University Press. pp. 21–99. ISBN 0-521-20092-X..
- Boyce, Mary (1984). Zoroastrians: Their Religious Beliefs and Practices. Psychology Press. pp. 1–252. ISBN 978-0415239028.
- Curtis, Vesta Sarkhosh (2016). "Ancient Iranian Motifs and Zoroastrian Iconography". In Williams, Markus; Stewart, Sarah; Hintze, Almut (eds.). The Zoroastrian Flame Exploring Religion, History and Tradition. I.B. Tauris. pp. 179–203. ISBN 978-0857728159.
- Dąbrowa, Edward (2007). "The Parthian Kingship". In Lanfranchi, Giovanni B.; Rollinger, Robert (eds.). Concepts of Kingship in Antiquity. Padova: S.A.R.G.O.N. Editrice e Libreria. pp. 123–134. ISBN 978-88-95672-01-4.
- Dąbrowa, Edward (2012). "The Arsacid Empire". In Daryaee, Touraj (ed.). The Oxford Handbook of Iranian History. Oxford University Press. pp. 1–432. ISBN 978-0-19-987575-7. Archived from the original on 2019-01-01.
- Olbrycht, Marek Jan (2016). "The Sacral Kingship of the early Arsacids I. Fire Cult and Kingly Glory". Anabasis. 7: 91–106.
- Chahin, Mark (2001). The Kingdom of Armenia. London: Routledge. ISBN 0-7007-1452-9.
- Grant, Michael (1956). The Annals of Imperial Rome. Penguin Classics. pp. 354–360. ISBN 0-14-044060-7.
- Gregoratti, Leonardo (2018). "Vologases I". In Bagnall, Roger (ed.). The Encyclopedia of Ancient History. Leiden: John Wiley & Sons.
- Henderson, Bernard W. (1901). "The Chronology of the Wars in Armenia, A.D. 51–63". Classical Review. 15 (3). Cambridge University Press: 159–165. doi:10.1017/S0009840X00029887. ISSN 0009-840X. S2CID 222639800.
- Hovannisian, Richard G. (1997). The Armenian people from ancient to modern times: from antiquity to the fourteenth century. Palgrave Macmillan. pp. 64–66. ISBN 0-312-10168-6.
- Khachatrian, Hayk (1998). All the 141 Armenian Kings. Yerevan: Amaras.
- Lynam, Robert (1850). The History of the Roman Emperors: From Augustus to the Death of Marcus Antoninus. London: Simpkin, Marshall & Co. pp. 422–428, 468–470.
- Cumont, F. (1905). Les religions orientales dans le paganisme romain. Turnhout: Brepols Publishers. ISBN 978-88-8419-289-9.
- Chaumont, M. L. (1986). "Armenia and Iran ii. The pre-Islamic period". Encyclopaedia Iranica, Vol. II, Fasc. 4. pp. 418–438.
- Chaumont, M. L.; Schippmann, K. (1988). "Balāš". Encyclopaedia Iranica, Vol. III, Fasc. 6. pp. 574–580.
- Girolamo Cardano Nero: An Exemplary Life Inkstone 2012.
- Russell, James R. (1987). Zoroastrianism in Armenia. Harvard University Press. ISBN 978-0674968509.

Tiridates I of Armenia Arsacid dynasty
Preceded by -	Tiridates I 52-58, 62-88	Succeeded by Sanatruk 91–109
