= Publius Cornelius Dexter =

Publius Cornelius Dexter was a Roman senator and general active during the middle of the second century AD. He was suffect consul for the nundinium July-September 159; the name of his colleague is not known. Dexter is known only from non-literary sources.

Older authors, such as Géza Alföldy and Ronald Syme, had thought Dexter's gentilicium was "Cassius", due to a second inscription, despite the fact that the inscription supplied a different praenomen for Dexter. Werner Eck and Peter Weiß have shown, based on further inscriptions in Greek from Cilicia, that Dexter's gentilicium was Cornelius. His name in full, as attested in an inscription from Kesmeburun, is Publius Cornelius Dexter Augus[tanus Alpin]us Bellicus Sollers Metilius [...]us Rutillianus. Olli Salomies, in his monograph on names of Early Imperial Rome, based on similarities with the full name of Marcus Sedatius Severianus, suggests the lacuna before "Rutillianus" may be Nepos Rufinus. Further, a series of elements in his name, "Augustanus Alpin]us Bellicus Sollers" is also duplicated in the names of the Pompeii Sosii. The simplest explanation for these shared names is to conclude Dexter and one of these other individuals were testamentary heirs where the testator required them to adopt his name.

== Life ==
Dexter's cursus honorum is known from an inscription found at Bodrum in Turkey. He began his career as one of the decemviri stlitibus judicandis, one of the four boards of the vigintiviri; membership in one of these four boards was a preliminary and required first step toward gaining entry into the Roman Senate. Then he was commissioned as a military tribune with Legio III Augusta, which at the time was stationed in Africa. He also served as sevir equitum Romanorum of the annual review of the equites at Rome prior to being quaestor, the office needed for Dexter to be enrolled into the Senate. His term as quaestor was followed by the Republican office plebeian tribune then praetor.

According to the order of offices in the Bodrum inscription, Dexter was admitted to the Septemviri epulonum, one of the four most prestigious collegia of ancient Roman priests, prior to acceding to the praetorship. After leaving that office, Dexter was commissioned as legatus legionis or commander of Legio IV Scythica; Alföldy dated his tenure from around 144 to 147 based on incorrect information about the date of his quaestorship; the date of Dexter's command of this legion thus must have been much later. Following the completion of his military service, he was appointed governor of the imperial province of Cilicia, which office he is attested as holding in 157. Due to the lack of information about his activities after his consulate, Alföldy assumed that Dexter died in office.

Political offices
Preceded by Marcus Pisibanius Lepidus, and Lucius Matuccius Fuscinus as suffect consuls	Consul of the Roman Empire; 159 with ignotus	Succeeded by Aulus Curtius Crispinus, and ignotus as suffect consuls
