= Gellius Maximus =

Roman usurper of the imperial throne (died 219)

Gellius Maximus was a Roman usurper, who, in 219 AD, revolted against Emperor Elagabalus. His rebellion was swiftly crushed, and he himself was executed.

== History ==
Gellius Maximus was the son of Lucius Gellius Maximus, who had served as Emperor Caracalla's doctor. For his services, Lucius Gellius Maximus received the rank of provincial procurator, making him the chief financial officer of his province. He himself did not achieve senatorial rank, but only the equestrian rank of procurator.

In the year of Gellius Maximus' revolt, 219 AD, several other usurpers arose as well, using a variety of justifications for their legitimacy. Among them were Seius Carus, by virtue of aristocratic heritage; Alexianus, and Castinus, by virtue of their relationship (or claimed relationship) to an imperial family; and Verus, by virtue of his military strength. Gellius Maximus likewise used his military strength as a justification for imperial legitimacy.

Before his revolt, Gellius Maximus was a senatorial tribune (second-in-command of the legion) of Legio IV Scythica legion. During his command of IV Scythica, his troops captured Diadumenian, the son of the previous emperor, Macrinus. After this success, an unnamed centurion in IV Scythica won the gratitude of Elagabalus for his command, whereas Gellius Maximus was ignored, and remained in his command at Zeugma. His being ignored by Elagabalus may have inspired his revolt.

He revolted in Coele-Syria, in 219 AD. His revolt was crushed rapidly due to the decisive action of the legate of the Legio XVI Flavia Firma, who had been stationed at the nearby city of Samosata, and whose name is only partially preserved, with the ending of his name being recorded as "atus". Gellius Maximus was then executed by Elagabalus.
