= Alan invasion of Parthia =

Invasion of the Alanians into Media and Armenia

Alan invasion of Parthia (72)
- Part of the Alan invasions of Parthia
Date	72
Location	Media Atropatene and Armenia (Parthian Empire)
Result	Alanian victory
Territorial changes	Temporary Alans captured of Media and Armenia

Belligerents
Alania; Durdzuks; Zygii	Parthian Empire; Armenia; Media Atropatene

Commanders and leaders
Prince Bazuk	Vologases I Pacorus I (AWOL); Tiridates I (AWOL)

Strength
Unknown	Unknown

Casualties and losses
Unknown	Heavy losses

The Alan invasion of Parthia (72) occurred in 72 when the Alans, a nomadic Sarmatian people, launched a major raid into the Parthian Empire and its vassals through the Caucasus Mountains. The invasion is one of the earliest recorded military encounters between the Alans and the settled kingdoms of Transcaucasia and is primarily described by the 1st-century Jewish historian Josephus in his work The Jewish War.

== Background ==
During the 1st century AD, the Alans had established themselves as a dominant force among the nomadic tribes of the Pontic–Caspian steppe, occupying lands northeast of the Sea of Azov along the Don River. They were an Iranian-speaking people of the Scythian-Sarmatian group, known to classical writers from the first centuries AD. They were known for their military prowess, particularly their heavy cavalry, and served at various times with the Romans, Parthians, and Sasanians. The Roman historian Ammianus Marcellinus later described their nomadic economy and warlike customs.

The Parthian Empire at this time was ruled by Vologases I (c. 51–78 AD), who had recently secured control over Armenia for his brother Tiridates I following the conclusion of the Roman–Parthian War of 58–63. The Alans' invasion route took them through the "Iron Gates" (likely the Darial Gorge), which they secured by negotiating with the king of Hyrcania, who controlled the strategic pass.

== The invasion ==
According to Josephus, the Alans, whom he describes as a "Scythian tribe" living around the Tanais (Don) and Lake Maeotis (Sea of Azov), planned a raid into Media for plunder. They advanced from their territory near Lake Maeotis, secured an alliance with the king of the now independent Hyrcania, and passed through the Caucasus.

=== Invasion of Media (72) ===
The Alans invaded Media in great numbers and caught the Medians completely by surprise. The Median satrap Pacorus I, a brother of Vologases I, fled in fear to inaccessible places, abandoning his country to be plundered. The Alans ravaged the land "which they found full of people, and replenished with abundance of cattle, while nobody dared make any resistance against them". Pacorus was only able to ransom his captured wife and concubines for 100 talents.

=== Invasion of Armenia (72) ===
After devastating Atropatene, the Alans proceeded into Armenia, laying waste to the country. King Tiridates I of Armenia confronted the invaders in battle but narrowly escaped capture. According to Josephus: "a certain man threw a noose over him and would soon have drawn him in, had he not immediately cut the cord with his sword and escaped".

The Alans, enraged by Tiridates escape, continued their devastation, carrying off large numbers of captives and massive amounts of booty from both kingdoms before retreating back to their own territory.

=== Role of Alan leadership ===
The medieval Georgian chronicles, compiled in the collection Kartlis Tskhovreba ("Life of Kartli"), preserve traditions about Alan rulers during this period. The chronicles specifically name Bazuk (ბაზუკი) as a king of the Alans (ovsTA mepe) during the 1st century AD. According to Georgian historical tradition, Bazuk led Alan forces in campaigns against the kingdoms of Transcaucasia, possibly including the invasion of 72 or 35 invasions in Armenia described by Flavius Josephus and Annals (Tacitus), though the Georgian sources do not provide an exact date for his reign. The Georgian chronicles also mention the Alans participating in Roman campaigns in Armenia, Media, and Parthia in the 1st and 2nd centuries AD.

The name "Bazuk" is of Iranian origin, consistent with the Alans' linguistic affiliation. Georgian sources also mention the "Alan Gates" (Darial Pass), which served as the main invasion route into Transcaucasia and was often controlled by Alan rulers.

== Aftermath ==
The invasion severely embarrassed the Parthian monarchy. Vologases I appealed to the Roman Empire for assistance against the Alans, requesting that the Roman emperor dispatch troops to fight the nomads. According to Suetonius, the future emperor Domitian actively sought to be placed in command of such an expedition, but the campaign never materialized.

The Roman emperor Vespasian, who had recently emerged victorious from the Year of the Four Emperors and was consolidating his rule, may have been reluctant to intervene. Some scholars suggest that Rome may have indirectly benefited from the Alan raid, as it weakened their Parthian rivals without requiring Roman military commitment.

Following the invasion, Vespasian strengthened Rome's eastern defenses. He was the first to station legions in Cappadocia. Two legions (the XII Fulminata and at least one other, probably the XVI Flavia) were stationed in Cappadocia. The small kingdom of Commagene was annexed in 72 AD, partly to prevent it from becoming a base for Parthian intrigue.

== Historical sources ==
The primary ancient sources for the 72 AD invasion are:

- Josephus, The Jewish War (Book VII, 244–251) – the most detailed account
- Suetonius, The Twelve Caesars (Domitian, 2.2) – mentions Vologases' appeal to Rome
- Cassius Dio, Roman History (LXV, 15.3) – a brief reference in the context of Vespasian's reign
- A Parthian inscription mentioning an earlier conflict between Vologases I and the Alan king Kuluk in 62 AD
- Kartlis Tskhovreba (Georgian Chronicles) – mentions Alan kings including Bazuk
- Moses of Khoren, History of the Armenians – contains accounts of Alan activities in the region

Modern historians have analyzed the invasion in the context of Roman–Parthian relations and the migration patterns of Iranian nomadic peoples. The dating of the event is generally accepted as 72 AD, though some scholars have proposed dates ranging from 72 to 74 AD based on chronological considerations

== See also ==
- Alans
- Vologases I of Parthia
- Roman–Parthian Wars
- Roman–Parthian War of 58–63
- Arrian's Ektaxis kata Alanoon (Battle Array against the Alans)
- Kartlis Tskhovreba
- Ossetians

== Sources ==
=== Primary sources ===
- Josephus, The Jewish War, Book VII.
- Suetonius, The Twelve Caesars, Life of Domitian.
- Cassius Dio, Roman History, Book LXIII.
- Tacitus, Annals, Book XV.

=== Secondary sources ===
- Alemany, Agustí (2000). Sources on the Alans: A Critical Compilation. Brill Academic Publishers. ISBN 978-90-04-11442-5.
- The Cambridge History of Iran, Volume 3(1): The Seleucid, Parthian and Sasanian Periods, ed. Ehsan Yarshater. Cambridge University Press, 1983. ISBN 978-0-521-20092-9.
- Melikishvili, G. (1959). On the History of Ancient Georgia. Tbilisi.
- Encyclopædia Iranica, "Alans", by Agustí Alemany. Available online.

=== Further reading ===
- Bachrach, Bernard S. (1973). A History of the Alans in the West. University of Minnesota Press. ISBN 0-8166-0678-1.
- Debevoise, Neilson C. (1938). A Political History of Parthia. University of Chicago Press.
- Täubler, E. (1909). "Zur Geschichte der Alanen". Klio. 9 (9): 14–28. doi:10.1524/klio.1909.9.9.14.
- Gutschmid, A. von (1888). Geschichte Irans und seiner Nachbarländer. Tübingen.
- Thomson, Robert W. (1996). Rewriting Caucasian History: The Medieval Armenian Adaptation of the Georgian Chronicles. Oxford University Press. ISBN 0-19-826373-2.
- Abaev, V. I. (1949). Ossetian Language and Folklore. Moscow-Leningrad: USSR Academy of Sciences.
- Abaev, V. I. (1985). "ALANS". Encyclopædia Iranica.
- Kulakovskiĭ, Yu. (1899). Alany po svedeniyam klassicheskikh i vizantiĭskikh pisateleĭ. Kiev.
- Miller, Vs. (1887). Osetinskiye etudy III. Moscow. pp. 39–116.
- Vernadsky, G. (1942–43). "Sur l'origine des Alains". Byzantion. 16: 81–86.
