= Lucius Annius Vinicianus =

1st century Roman senator and consul suffectus

Lucius Annius Vinicianus (died AD 42) was a Roman senator during the Principate. He is best known for his involvement in the assassination of Caligula and a rebellion against Claudius.

== Family ==
Vinicianus was probably the son of Gaius Annius Pollio, suffect consul 4 September of an unknown year, most likely AD 21 or 22, and Vinicia, making him a nephew of Marcus Vinicius. This Marcus Vinicius was married to Julia Livilla, the youngest daughter of Germanicus. Vinicianus was also the father of the Annius Vinicianus who married a daughter of Gnaeus Domitius Corbulo. He was also the father of another Annius Pollio.

== Career ==
Early in his career, AD 32, Vinicianus and his father were charged with treason during the aftermath of the downfall of Sejanus. However Tiberius intervened for them and they were not condemned. Vinicianus cultivated a friendship with Marcus Aemilius Lepidus, the husband of Caligula's favourite sister Julia Drusilla, who had been designated as Caligula's heir. This friendship was fruitful for Vinicianus' career as in 38 Vinicianus became one of the Arval Brethren. Vinicianus served as consul suffectus in either 39 or 40.

== Assassination of Caligula ==
In 41 Vinicianus and his uncle Marcus Vinicius both became involved in the successful plot of Cassius Chaerea to assassinate Caligula. Vinicianus was considered as a possible successor to Caligula and he opposed Decimus Valerius Asiaticus when he attempted to succeed instead. The discussion on the succession ended when it was announced to the Senate that the praetorian guard had declared Caligula's uncle Claudius the new emperor.

== Revolt against Claudius ==
In 42 Vinicianus supported Lucius Arruntius Camillus Scribonianus in his revolt against Claudius. Claudius considered abdicating in favor of Scribonianus, but was dissuaded after consulting leading men. After the revolt failed both Vinicianus and Scribonianus killed themselves.

== Aftermath ==
Vinicianus would not be the last of his family to conspire against the Caesars. Both his sons would be involved in conspiracies against Nero; Annius Pollio would be implicated in the Pisonian conspiracy in AD 65 and the younger Lucius Annius Vinicianus would be involved in a plot to overthrow Nero and make his father-in-law emperor.

== Bibliography ==
- Barrett, Anthony A. (1989). Caligula: The Corruption of Power. New Haven: Yale University Press. ISBN 0-300-04653-7.
- Lucius Cassius Dio Cocceianus (Cassius Dio), Roman History.
- Publius Cornelius Tacitus, Annales, Historiae.
- Gaius Suetonius Tranquillus, De Vita Caesarum (Lives of the Caesars, or The Twelve Caesars).
