= Battle of Rhandeia =

62 battle

- Part of the Roman–Parthian War of 58–63
- Map of the troop movements during the last years of the Roman-Parthian War over Armenia (58 to 63 AD).
| Date | Spring of 62 |
| Location | Rhandeia, Kingdom of Armenia 39°24′N 43°48′E |
| Result | Armenian-Parthian victory; Treaty of Rhandeia |

Belligerents
| Roman Empire | Arsacid Armenia; Parthian Empire |

Commanders and leaders
| Lucius Caesennius Paetus | Tiridates I |

Strength
| IV Scythica; XII Fulminata | Unknown |

The Battle of Rhandeia, fought in the spring of 62 AD, was a military confrontation between combined Armenian-Parthian forces and the Roman Empire. The clash took place near Rhandeia, northeast of Melitene (modern-day Malatya in Turkey), with the Armenian troops led by Tiridates I and the Parthian forces commanded by Vologases I. The Roman force was commanded by Lucius Caesennius Paetus. This battle marked a pivotal moment in the struggle for dominance in the region between the Roman Empire and the Parthian-Armenian alliance.

The Roman legions, defeated and humiliated, were forced to pass under a yoke of Armenian spears, a deeply symbolic and degrading punishment for any soldier. Following this act of submission, Paetus and his troops withdrew from the territory of Greater Armenia. Two years later, in 64 AD, the Treaty of Rhandeia was signed at the same site where the battle had taken place. This treaty formally recognized Tiridates I as the king of Armenia and established the Arsacid dynasty, which would rule Armenia for centuries. The agreement also marked a significant diplomatic compromise, as Tiridates I agreed to receive his crown from the Roman emperor Nero, symbolizing a fragile balance of power between Rome and Parthia in the region. This event solidified Armenia's position as a key player in the geopolitical struggles of the ancient world.

== Background ==
Armenia and the Roman East in 50 AD, before the outbreak of the war.

In AD 51 Mithridates, the Roman client-king of Armenia, was deposed by a Parthian campaign into the region, and the Parthians installed his brother Tiridates I on the throne as their place-man. This was unacceptable to Rome, as their eastern border was thereby weakened, and eventually Gnaeus Domitius Corbulo was sent into the region in AD 58 with three legions. After a short one-year campaign, the Romans in their turn installed Tigranes VI on the Armenian throne.

But the situation in the east was far from stable and after Tigranes made an inadvisable probing offensive into Parthia in AD 61, the Parthians under Vologases counter-attacked and laid siege to the Armenian city of Tigranocerta, which was garrisoned by Armenian and Roman forces. However, the city was well-supplied while the attackers were not, and a mutual disengagement and withdrawal was negotiated between the two armies.

== Battle ==
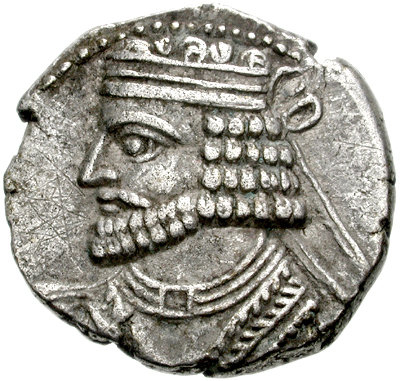
Silver coin of Vologases I, King of Parthia.

Paetus was the governor of the Roman province of Cappadocia, and followed a Parthian declaration of war and capture of Tigranocerta with his own invasion of Armenia in 62 AD. Corbulo at this time was in Roman Syria, strengthening the defenses on the Euphrates frontier. Paetus had only two legions with him, IV Scythica and XII Fulminata, and advanced towards Tigranocerta, desiring to establish a military reputation and confident of victory. However, only a few minor Armenian forts were taken, and a lack of supplies forced him to withdraw westwards for the winter.

Corbulo in the meantime was aware of the danger faced by his colleague, and put part of his forces on standby, but he did not march immediately to join Paetus, and some accused him of delaying in order to reap more glory from rescuing Paetus. Nevertheless, when the calls for assistance arrived, he responded quickly and marched north with half of the Syrian army, carrying many provisions laden on camels. But before he could reinforce them, Paetus had been defeated by the combined Armenian and Parthian army and forced to surrender.

The subsequent treaty was humiliating: not only were the Romans to leave Armenia and surrender all forts they held, but they also had to build a bridge over the nearby Arsanias river over which Vologases could pass in triumph, sitting atop an elephant. In addition, Paetus' army was liberally plundered by the Armenians, who took even the Romans' weapons and clothes without facing any resistance. Still worse, according to rumors reported by Tacitus, the Romans were made to pass under the yoke, a gesture of ultimate humiliation in Roman eyes.

The two Roman forces met on the banks of the Euphrates near Melitene, amidst scenes of mutual grief. While Corbulo lamented the undoing of his achievements, Paetus tried to convince him to attempt to reverse the situation by again invading Armenia. However, Corbulo refused, claiming that he did not have the authority to do so, and that in any case the combined Roman forces were too worn out to be able to campaign effectively. Paetus returned to Cappadocia and Corbulo to Syria, where he received envoys from Vologases, who demanded that he evacuate his bridgehead over the Euphrates. In turn, Corbulo demanded the Parthian evacuation of Armenia. Vologases agreed to this, and both sides withdrew their forces, leaving Armenia once again nominally independent but de facto under Parthian control, until a Parthian delegation could travel to Rome.
