= Legio IV Scythica =

Roman legion

Fourth Legion Scythica
- Legio IV Scythica; Legio IIII Scythica; Legio Quarta Scythica
- Map of the Roman Empire under the reign of Hadrian (125 AD), showing the Fourth Legion Scythica, stationed on the river Euphrates at Zeugma (near modern Gaziantep, Turkey), in the Roman province of Syria, from 68 AD until possibly the 4th century.
- Active: c. 42 BC until 219 AD (confirmed)
- Country: Roman Republic (closing years) and Roman Empire
- Type: Roman legion

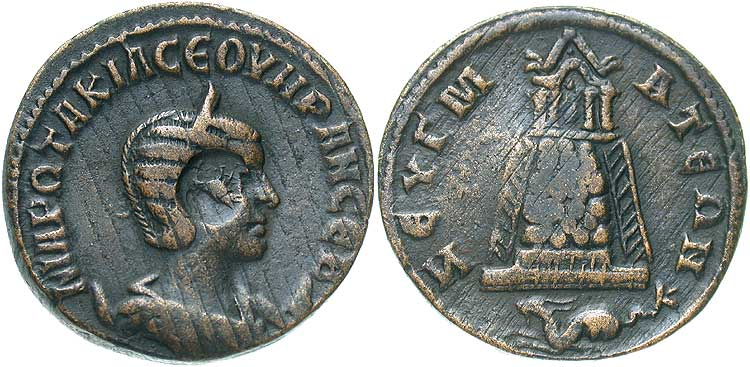
Coin issued by Philip the Arab for his wife Marcia Otacilia Severa. On the reverse in the exergue, a capricorn, in reference to IIII Scythica, beneath a tetrastyle temple; mint of Zeugma, Roman Syria, a legionary camp. BMC 34.

Legio IV Scythica ("Scythian Fourth Legion"), also written as Legio IIII Scythica, was a legion of the Imperial Roman army founded in c. 42 BC by the Roman general Mark Antony, for his campaign against the Parthian Empire, hence its other cognomen, Parthica. The legion was still active in the Roman province of Syria in the early 5th century.

== Origins and service during the Roman Republic ==
The Legio IV Scythica was founded by the Roman general Mark Antony after 42 BC. It is unknown where the legion was first stationed, although Syria is a possibility. If that is the case, the legion most likely took part in Mark Antony's campaign against the Parthians. The name Scythica implies that it fought the Scythians. The Scythians were a group of nomadic tribes located near a Roman city named Olbia. The Scythians also occasionally tried to cross the Danube. This makes it very likely the Legion defeated one of the Scythian tribes in a battle.

== Service under the Roman Empire ==
After the Battle of Actium (31 BC) and Mark Antony's suicide, Octavian transferred the Legio IV Scythica to the Roman province of Moesia, in the Danube area. The legion is reported to have taken part in civilian tasks, such as the building and keeping of roads. In his youth, future Roman Emperor Vespasian served in this legion. The legion's base was probably at Viminacium.

=== Tiberius's war against Illyria ===
Between 6 and 9 AD, the IV Scythica took part in Tiberius' wars against the Illyrians and Pannonians. The legion also constructed roads and other works of engineering in the Danube area.

=== Roman–Parthian War of 58–63 ===
King Vologases I of Parthia invaded Armenia, a client kingdom of Rome, in 58 AD, beginning the war against the Parthians (58–63 AD). Nero ordered Gnaeus Domitius Corbulo, the new legate of Cappadocia, to manage the matter. Corbulo brought the Legio IIII Scythica from Moesia, and with the legions III Gallica and VI Ferrata they defeated the Parthians, restoring Tigranes VI to the Armenian throne. In 62 AD, IIII Scythica and XII Fulminata, commanded by the new legate of Cappadocia, Lucius Caesennius Paetus, were defeated by the Parthians at the Battle of Rhandeia and forced to surrender. The legions were covered with shame and withdrawn from the war theatre to Zeugma. This city would be the base camp of IIII Scythica for the next century.

=== Year of the Four Emperors ===
In the Year of the Four Emperors, in 69 AD, the IV Scythica, alongside the rest of the Eastern legions, sided with Vespasian immediately. Despite the demonstrated loyalty, IV Scythica was not involved in actual fighting because it was not considered a high-quality legion. This was a consequence of an earlier defeat in the First Jewish–Roman War (66–73 AD). In 70 AD, the legion was used to stop a pogrom against the Jewish population of Antioch. The legion would also build a canal in Seleucia Pieria.

=== Roman–Parthian Wars and Roman–Sassanid Wars ===
The IV Scythica took part in the Parthian campaign of Trajan, As well as the war against the Parthians (161–166 AD). Between 181 and 183 AD, Septimius Severus acted as the commander of the Eastern legions, and he later relied on the power of said legions to become the next Roman Emperor. The legion's former commander, now Emperor, Semptimus Severus would lead another campaign against the Parthians. This campaign also used the IV Scythica. The legion was most likely involved in the eastern campaign of Caracalla in 219 AD.

=== Revolt and disappearance ===
The legion disappeared from Roman historiographical sources after 219 AD, when their commander, Gellius Maximus, rebelled against Emperor Elagabalus and proclaimed himself Emperor, but was defeated. However, according to Notitia Dignitatum (XXXIII), in the early 3rd century, the IV Scythica was still active in Roman Syria, camped in Orese. It is possible this legion participated in the campaigns of Severus Alexander and Odaenathus against the Sassanids.

== Attested members ==
Name	Rank	Time frame	Province	Source
Lucius Funisulanus Vettonianus	legatus legionis	c. 62	Armenia	CIL III, 4013, Tacitus, Annales, xv.7
Gnaeus Pompeius Collega	legatus legionis	69-c. 70	Syria	Josephus, Bell. Jud. vii.3, 4
Tiberius Julius Celsus Polemaeanus	legatus legionis	c. 80-82	Syria	AE 1905, 120, AE 1905, 121
Aulus Larcius Priscus	legatus legionis	c. 97	Syria	CIL VIII, 17891, AE 1908, 237
Gaius Julius Severus	legatus legionis	c. 132	Syria	CIG 4031, 4032 = IGR III 173, 174
Gaius Julius Scapula	legatus legionis	c. 135	Syria	CIG 4022, 4023
Quintus Voconius Saxa Fidus	legatus legionis	?138-?141	Syria	IGR III 173, 174
Publius Cornelius Dexter	legatus legionis	?144-?147	Syria	CIL III, 12116 = ILS 1050
Lucius Septimius Severus	legatus legionis	c. 181 - c. 183	Syria	Historia Augusta, "Vita Severi" 3.6
Aulus Vicirius A.f. Proculus	tribunus laticlavius	c. 50	Syria	
Quintus Paesidius Macedo	tribunus angusticlavius	between 40 and 54	Syria	AE 1923, 40
Lucius Julius Marinus Caecilius Simplex	tribunus laticlavius	c. 80	Syria	CIL IX, 4965
Gaius Julius Proculus	tribunus laticlavius	c. 100	Syria	CIL X, 6658 = ILS 1040
Publius Manilius Vopiscus Vicinillianus	tribunus laticlavius	c. 107	Syria	CIL XIV, 4242 = ILS 1044
Claudius Maximus	tribunus laticlavius	c. 115	Syria	CIL III, 10336
Tiberius Claudius Helius Secundus	tribunus angusticlavius	between 96 and 118	Syria	AE 1925, 44
Gnaeus Cornelius Pulcher	tribunus angusticlavius	between 96 and 118	Syria	IG 4.795
Tiberius Claudius Pius	tribunus angusticlavius	between 100 and 120	Syria	AE 1933, 270
T. Statilius [...]nus	tribunus angusticlavius	between 118 and 130	Syria	
C. Julius Juli Quadrati f. Severus	tribunus laticlavius	Before 134	Syria	AE 1923, 4
Gaius Arrius Antoninus	tribunus laticlavius	c. 150	Syria	CIL VIII, 7030
Gaius Sempronius Fidus	tribunus angusticlavius	between 70 and 150	Syria	CIL II, 4245
Publius Julius Geminius Marcianus	tribunus laticlavius	c. 155	Syria	
Julius Antoninus	tribunus angusticlavius	between 118 and 161	Syria	IGR 3.500
Lucius Egnatuleius Sabinus	tribunus angusticlavius	c. 175	Syria	CIL VIII, 10500 = ILS 1409
Tiberius Claudius Telemachus	tribunus angusticlavius	after 185	Syria	AE 1981, 844
Lucius Marius Perpetuus	tribunus laticlavius	late 2nd century	Syria	CIL III, 1178 = ILS 1165
Gellius Maximus	tribunus laticlavius	c. 219	Syria	Dio Cassius lxxix.7.1
Gaius Aemilius Berenicianus Maximus	tribunus laticlavius	first quarter 3rd century	Syria	CIL XII, 3163 = ILS 1168

== Epigraphic testimonies ==
- Caio Sempronio Marci filio Galeria (tribu) Fido Calagorritano / tribuno militum legionis IIII Scythicae tribuno militum (...).
- D(is) M(anibus) / Ael(ius) Verecundinus / (centurio) leg(ionis) IIII / Scy(thicae) hastatus (p)rior natus / in Dacia ad Vatabos mil(itavit) ann(os) XXI / primum exactus librarius / frum(entarius) speculator evocatus |(centurio) et |(centurio) frum(entarius) / vixit ann(os) XXXVI Ael(ius) Rufinus lib(ertus) ex bon/is eius fecit..

== Unit symbol ==
The legion's symbol was a capricorn.

== In popular culture ==
The legion appeared in Harry Sidebottom's series of historical novels Warrior of Rome.

== See also ==
- List of Roman legions
- Siege of Dura-Europos (256)
