= Pacorus of Media Atropatene =

1st century AD Parthian prince who ruled Media Atropatene

Pacorus of Media Atropatene (also spelled Pakorus) was a Parthian prince who ruled Media Atropatene in the mid 1st-century.

Pacorus was a son of Vonones II (r. 51). When Vonones II died in 51, his son Vologases I became the new Parthian king. Vologases I sought to continue the policies of the prominent former Parthian king Artabanus II (r. 12–38/41), and thus, one of his first objectives was to strengthen the bolster the Parthian position in strategically and politically unstable regions which had served for decades as the source of war with the Romans. He gave the kingship of Media Atropatene to Pacorus, while the even more politically important kingship of Armenia was given to Vologases I's brother Tiridates.

Little is known of Pacorus' rule in Media Atropatene, except that, in 72, a Alans invaded of Media Atropatene and forced him to flee into the mountains. Pacorus was forced to pay the Alans to have his wife and concubines released from captivity. The Alans also invaded Armenia, and nearly captured Tiridates in battle; he was lassoed from a distance and caught, but he quickly managed to whip out his sword and slash the rope in time. The Alans then withdrew with a lot of booty after plundering Armenia and Media Atropatene.

== Sources ==
- Alemany, Agustí (2000). Sources on the Alans: A Critical Compilation. BRILL. ISBN 9789004114425.
- Brosius, Maria (2000). "Women i. In Pre-Islamic Persia". Encyclopaedia Iranica, Vol. London et al.
- Chaumont, M. L. (1986). "Armenia and Iran ii. The pre-Islamic period". Encyclopaedia Iranica, Vol. II, Fasc. 4. pp. 418–438.
- Chaumont, M. L.; Schippmann, K. (1988). "Balāš". Encyclopaedia Iranica, Vol. III, Fasc. 6. pp. 574–580.
- Dąbrowa, Edward (2007). "The Parthian Kingship": 123–134.
- Dąbrowa, Edward (2012). "The Arsacid Empire". In Daryaee, Touraj (ed.). The Oxford Handbook of Iranian History. Oxford University Press. pp. 1–432. ISBN 978-0-19-987575-7. Archived from the original on 2019-01-01.
- Olbrycht, Marek Jan (2013). "Vologases I and Pakoros II in Parthia". 7: 280–286.
- Schippmann, K. (1987). "Azerbaijan iii. Pre-Islamic History". Encyclopaedia Iranica, Vol. III, Fasc. 2. pp. 221–224.
