= Gotarzes II =

1st-century AD king of the Parthian Empire

Gotarzes II 𐭂𐭅𐭕𐭓𐭆
- King of Kings
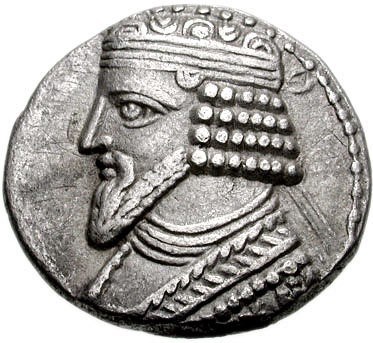
- Gotarzes II's portrait on the obverse of a tetradrachm, minted in 49

King of the Parthian Empire
- Reign: 40 – 51
- Predecessor: Vardanes I
- Successor: Vonones II
- Died: 51
- Dynasty: Arsacid dynasty
- Father: Gev (biological); Artabanus II (adoptive)
- Religion: Zoroastrianism

Gotarzes II (Parthian: 𐭂𐭅𐭕𐭓𐭆 Gōtarz) was king of the Parthian Empire from 40 to 51. He was an adopted son of Artabanus II. When his father died in 40, his brother Vardanes I was to succeed to the throne. However, the throne was seized by Gotarzes II. Gotarzes II eventually was able to gain control of most of Parthia forcing Vardanes to flee to Bactria. With the death of Vardanes in c. 46, Gotarzes II ruled the Parthian Empire until his death. Gotarzes II was succeeded by his uncle Vonones II.

== Origins ==
Little is known of the early life of Gotarzes II prior to his becoming King of Parthia. Although Gotarzes II was a son of Artabanus II, it is unknown whether he was a biological or adoptive son. Josephus calls Gotarzes II the brother of Vologases I. Tacitus, on the other hand, does not explicitly describe Gotarzes II as a son of Artabanus II. However, he refers to him as a Parthian usurper who was responsible for the murder of his brother, Artabanus, and his family.

The Roman sources are obscure on his background; however, other surviving evidence reveals a lot more about the origins of Gotarzes II. An inscription on a rock relief that was discovered by Rawlinson at Sarpul-I-Zohab on a main road in Iranian Kurdistan introduces him as Gotarzes, son of Gev. From this inscription, it has been surmised that Gotarzes II was the son of a Hyrcanian nobleman called Gev who served as satrap in that region. Later, he was adopted by Artabanus II during his exile in recognition of a debt that his father owed Artabanus. When Gotarzes II later took the throne, he referred to himself as a son of Artabanus II, as evidenced by a surviving coin bearing the legend: Arsaces, king of kings, called Gotarzes, son of Artabanos.

== Kingship ==
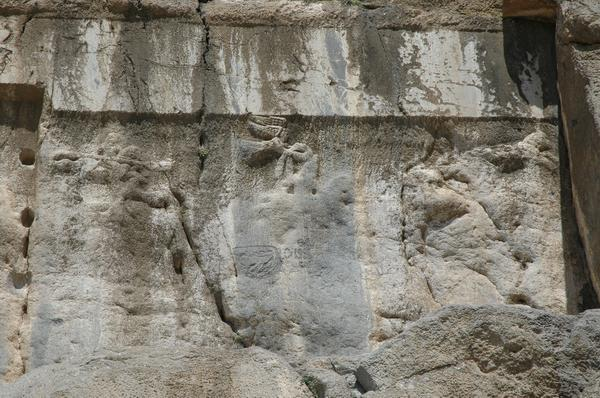
Damaged equestrian relief of Gotarzes II at Behistun.

In c. 40 AD, the reigning Parthian king Artabanus II (r. 12–40) died, entrusting his realm to his son Vardanes I. However, the throne was seized by Gotarzes II, an adopted son of Artabanus II. Gotarzes had another of his brothers, Artabanus, along with his wife and child, executed shortly after. An uproar against this execution shortly followed, with an appeal being sent to Vardanes, who took Gotarzes by surprise and defeated him, after travelling 375 miles in two days. Vardanes was applauded by the governors of the neighbouring Parthian provinces, and quickly gained control over most of the Parthian realm. The Mesopotamian city of Seleucia, which had been in rebellion since 35, did not acknowledge Vardanes, who soon besieged the city. However, the long siege of Seleucia resulted in Gotarzes gaining the upper hand in the conflict, allowing him to raise a new force and drive off Vardanes, who fled to Bactria in Central Asia.

At the same time, Armenia suffered turmoil, when its Arsacid king Orodes, the brother of Vardanes, was deposed by the Roman emperor Claudius (r. 41–54), who appointed the Pharnavazid prince Mithridates in his stead. Simultaneously, just before Vardanes and Gotarzes clashed in battle, they reached an accord after Gotarzes informed Vardanes of a conspiracy being planned against them by a prominent group. The accord was that Vardanes was to keep his crown, while Gotarzes withdrew to Hyrcania.

Encouraged by his other recent triumphs, Vardanes prepared to invade and reconquer Armenia, but ultimately abandoned his plans, due to threats of war from the Roman governor of Syria, Gaius Vibius Marsus, along with renewed conflict with Gotarzes, who terminated their accord. Vardanes defeated Gotarzes on the Erindes, a river situated on the Media-Hyrcania border. He then proceeded to conquer the remaining Parthian provinces, reaching as far as Aria. In c. 46 he was assassinated while hunting at the instigation of a party of Parthian nobles who feared that their status might become endangered.

Soon afterwards Gotarzes II died (according to Tacitus, of an illness, although Josephus stated that he was murdered). His last coin is dated from June 51. Gotarzes II was succeeded briefly by his uncle Vonones II and then by the latter's son, Vologases I.

== In fiction ==
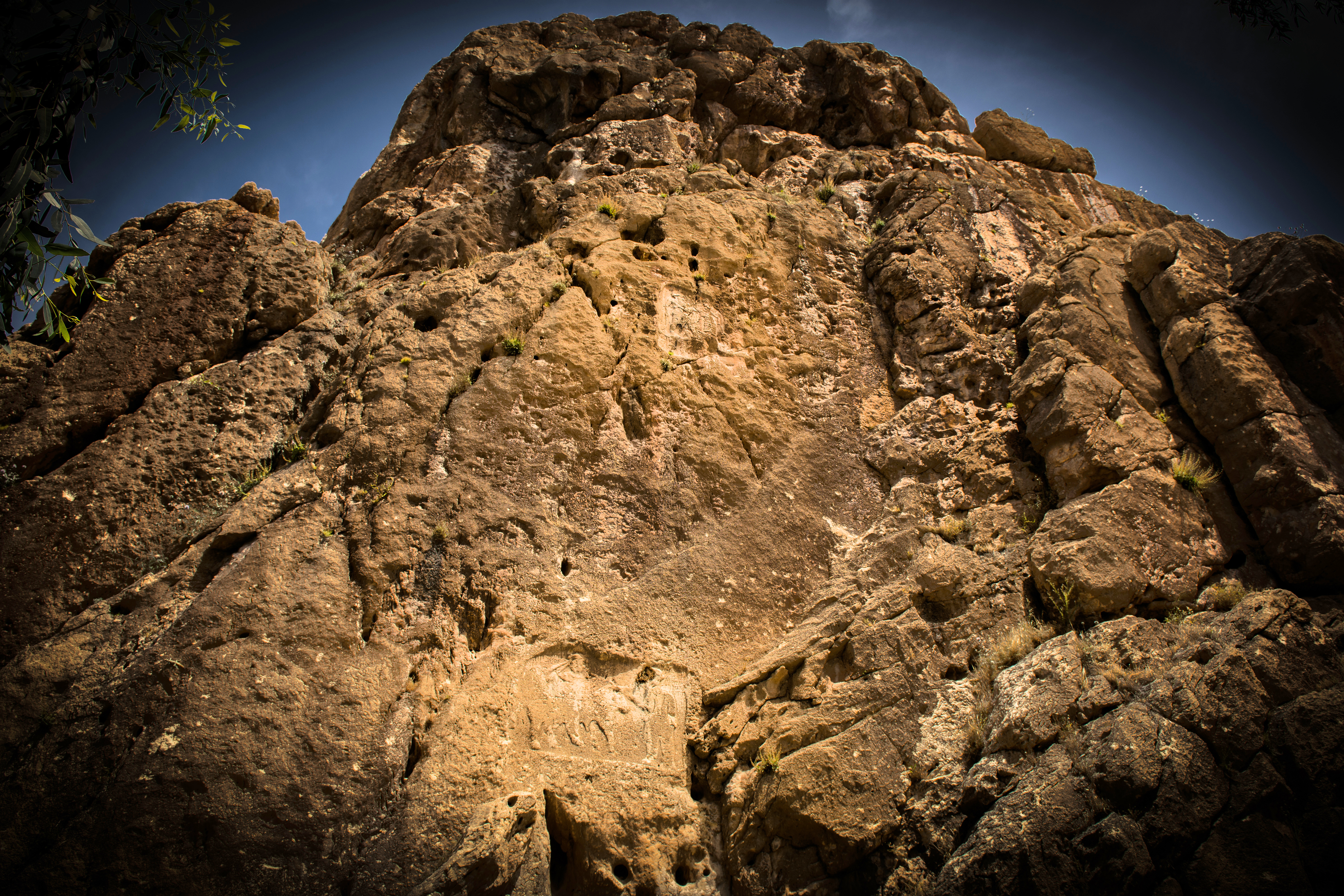
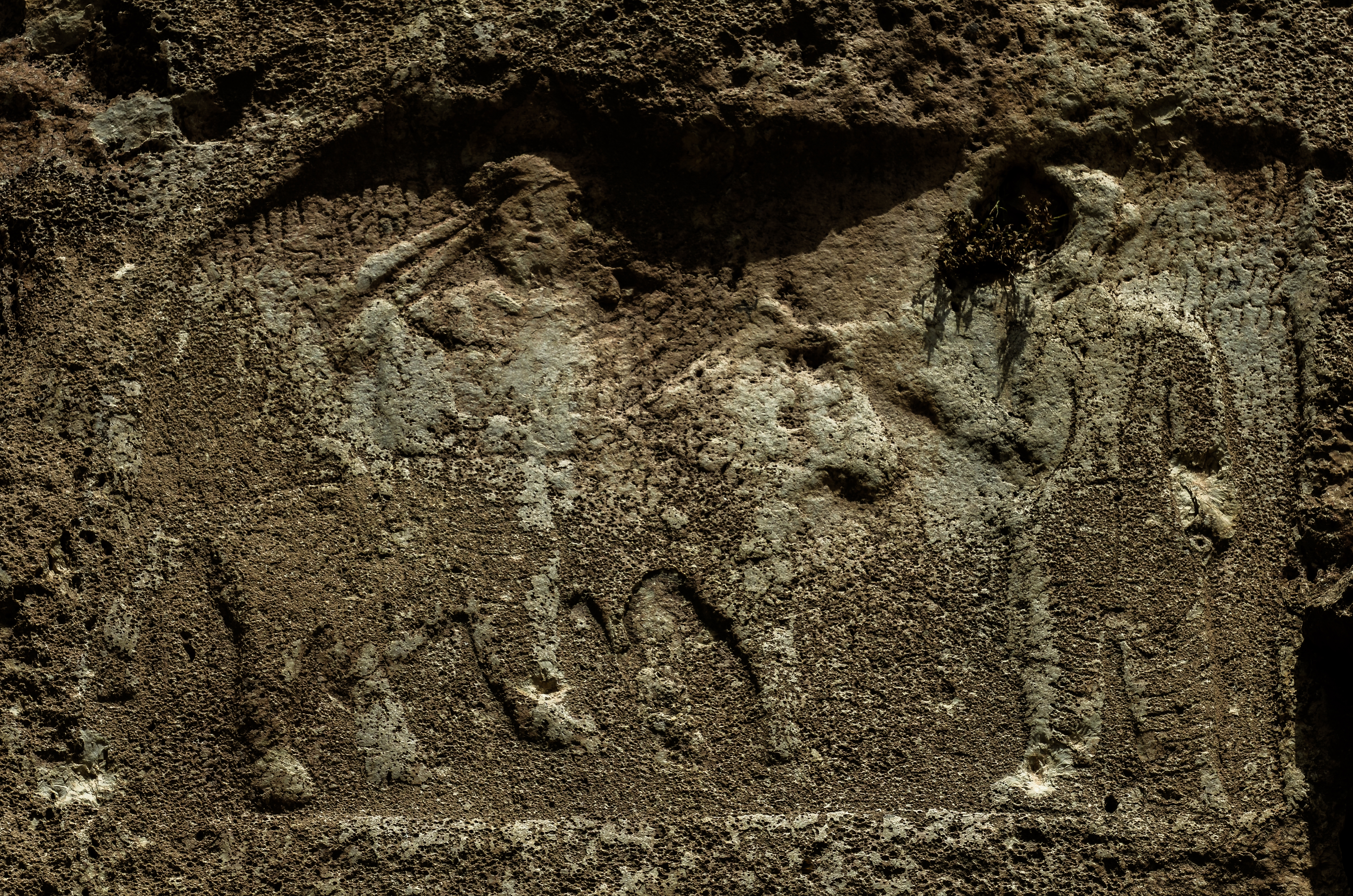
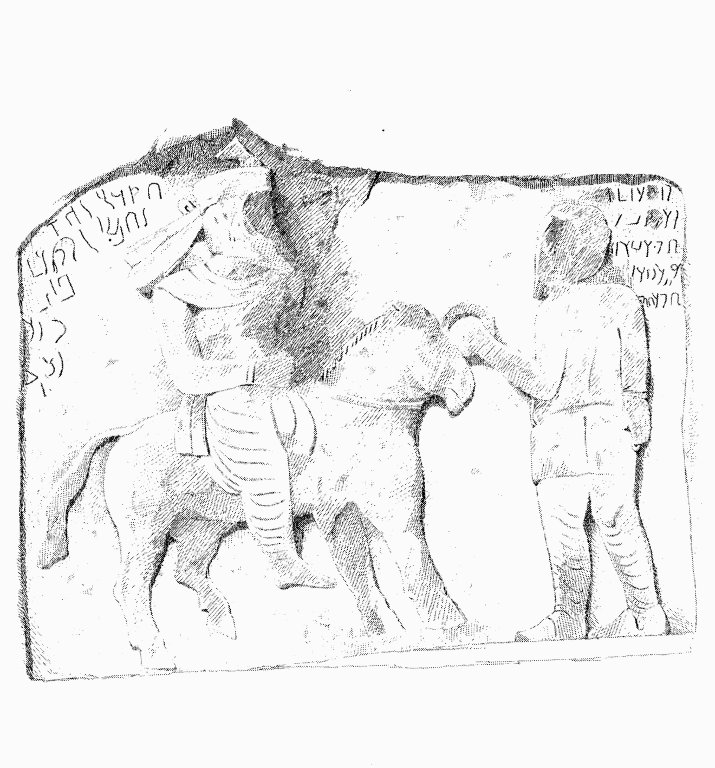
Relief a Parthian king on horse, named Gotarzes, probably Gotarzes II, with attendant or satrap. This relief is located below the Anubanini rock relief at Sarpul-I-Zohab.

Gotarzes II is unfavourably portrayed in Robert Graves' novel Claudius the God. Gotarzes is presented as a cruel tyrant. The gravest of insults lobbed by Claudius against Gortazes is that he was idolized by Caligula, and was a close advisor of the mad Roman Emperor.

== Bibliography ==
=== Ancient works ===
- Josephus, Antiquities of the Jews
- Tacitus, Annals

=== Modern works ===
- Bivar, A.D.H. (1983). "The Political History of Iran Under the Arsacids". In Yarshater, Ehsan (ed.). The Cambridge History of Iran: The Seleucid, Parthian and Sasanian Periods. Vol. 3(1). Cambridge: Cambridge University Press. pp. 21–99. ISBN 0-521-20092-X.
- Bivar, A.D.H. (2007), "Gondophares and the Indo-Parthians", in Curtis, Vesta Sarkhosh and Sarah Stewart (ed.), The Age of the Parthians: The Ideas of Iran, vol. 2, London & New York: I.B. Tauris & Co Ltd., in association with the London Middle East Institute at SOAS and the British Museum, pp. 26–36, ISBN 978-1-84511-406-0
- Dąbrowa, Edward (2012). "The Arsacid Empire". In Daryaee, Touraj (ed.). The Oxford Handbook of Iranian History. Oxford University Press. pp. 1–432. ISBN 978-0-19-987575-7. Archived from the original on 2019-01-01.
- Dąbrowa, Edward (2017). "Tacitus on the Parthians". Electrum: 171–189.
- Gregoratti, Leonardo (2017). "The Arsacid Empire". In Daryaee, Touraj (ed.). King of the Seven Climes: A History of the Ancient Iranian World (3000 BCE - 651 CE). UCI Jordan Center for Persian Studies. pp. 1–236. ISBN 9780692864401.
- Lukonin, V.G. (1983). "Political, Social and Administrative Institutions: Taxes and Trade". In Yarshater, Ehsan (ed.). The Cambridge History of Iran: The Seleucid, Parthian and Sasanian Periods. Vol. 3(2). Cambridge: Cambridge University Press. pp. 681–746. ISBN 0-521-24693-8.
- Marcato, Enrico (2018). Personal Names in the Aramaic Inscriptions of Hatra. Digital Publishing. ISBN 9788869692314.
- Olbrycht, Marek Jan (2016). "Dynastic Connections in the Arsacid Empire and the Origins of the House of Sāsān". In Curtis, Vesta Sarkhosh; Pendleton, Elizabeth J.; Alram, Michael; Daryaee, Touraj (eds.). The Parthian and Early Sasanian Empires: Adaptation and Expansion. Oxbow Books. ISBN 9781785702082.

Gotarzes II Arsacid dynasty Died: 51
Preceded by Vardanes I	King of the Parthian Empire; 40–51	Succeeded by Vonones II
