= Vonones II =

1st century king of Media Atropatene

- King of Kings
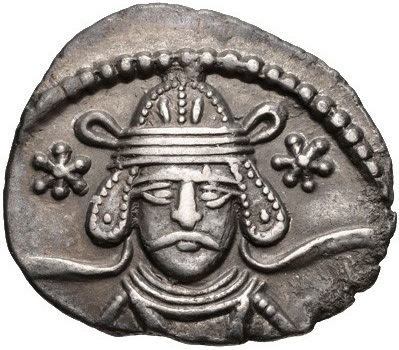
- Coin of Vonones II

King of Media Atropatene
- Reign: 11 – 51
- Predecessor: Artabanus II
- Successor: Pacorus

King of the Parthian Empire
- Reign: 51
- Predecessor: Gotarzes II
- Successor: Vologases I
- Died: 51 AD
- Spouse: “Greek concubine” (paelex Graeca), mother of king Vologases I
- Issue: Vologases I Pacorus; Tiridates I of Armenia
- Dynasty: Arsacid dynasty
- Father: Dahae or Atropatid prince
- Mother: unnamed daughter of Phraates IV
- Religion: Zoroastrianism

Vonones II (died 51 AD) was a Parthian prince who ruled as king of Media Atropatene and briefly as king of the Parthian Empire.

Vonones was not from the ruling branch of the Arsacid royal family. His father has been variously identified as being a member of the Atropatid dynasty, or as a Dahae prince descended from the former Arsacid monarch Mithridates II (r. 124–88 BC). Vonones II's mother was a daughter of the Arsacid King of Kings Phraates IV (r. 37–2 BC). His brother was the Parthian King Artabanus II.

From about 11 AD until 51 AD, Vonones II ruled as king of Media Atropatene, a period about which little is known.

After the death of his nephew Gotarzes II, Vonones II became king of the Parthian Empire in 51 AD. However, he died a few months into his reign and was succeeded by his son, Vologases I. Tacitus wrote that Vonones II “knew neither success nor failure which have deserved to be remembered to him. It was a short and inglorious reign”.

Vonones II had 3 sons who, respectively, held the thrones of Parthia, Media Atropatene and Armenia: Vologases I, Pacorus and Tiridates I.

== Sources ==
- Josephus, Antiquities of the Jews, xx, 3, 4.
- Tacitus, Annals
- Meyer, Eduard (1911). "Vonones s.v. Vonones II." . In Chisholm, Hugh (ed.). Encyclopædia Britannica. Vol. 28 (11th ed.). Cambridge University Press. p. 211.
- M. Bunson, A Dictionary of the Roman Empire, Oxford University Press, 1995
- W. Woodthorpe Tarn, The Greeks in Bactria and India, Cambridge University Press, 2010
- Olbrycht, Marek Jan (2014). "The Genealogy of Artabanos II (AD 8/9–39/40), King of Parthia". Miscellanea Anthropologica et Sociologica. 15 (3): 92–97. doi:10.5604/20842937.1134333 (inactive 12 July 2025).
- Olbrycht, Marek Jan (2016). "Dynastic Connections in the Arsacid Empire and the Origins of the House of Sāsān". In Curtis, Vesta Sarkhosh; Pendleton, Elizabeth J.; Alram, Michael; Daryaee, Touraj (eds.). The Parthian and Early Sasanian Empires: Adaptation and Expansion. Oxbow Books. ISBN 9781785702082.
- Schippmann, K. (1987). "Azerbaijan iii. Pre-Islamic History". Encyclopaedia Iranica, Vol. III, Fasc. 2. pp. 221–224.
- Schottky, Martin (1991). "Parther, Meder und Hyrkanier . Eine Untersuchung der dynastischen und geographischen Verflechtungen im Iran des 1. Jhs . n . Chr". Archäo- logische Mitteilungen aus Iran (in German). 24.

Vonones II Arsacid dynasty Died: 51
Preceded by Gotarzes II	King of the Parthian Empire; 51	Succeeded by Vologases I
