= Vardanes I =

King of the Parthian Empire (ruled 40-46 CE)

- King of Kings
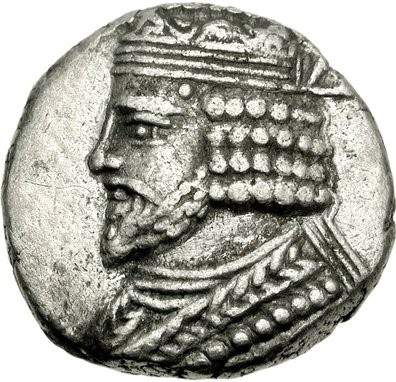
- Coin of Vardanes I, Seleucia mint

King of the Parthian Empire
- Reign: 40 – 46 CE
- Predecessor: Artabanus II
- Successor: Gotarzes II
- Died: 46
- Dynasty: Arsacid dynasty
- Father: Artabanus II
- Religion: Zoroastrianism

Vardanes I was a king of the Parthian Empire from 40 to 46 CE. He was the heir apparent of his father Artabanus II (r. 12–40), but had to continually fight against his brother Gotarzes II, a rival claimant to the throne. Vardanes' short reign ended when he was assassinated while hunting at the instigation of a party of Parthian nobles.

== Name ==
"Vardanes" (also spelled Bardanes) is the Latin attestation of the Middle Iranian name Wardān, meaning "rose". The name is transliterated in Greek as Ordanes Ὀρδάνης and Ordones Ὀρδώνης, and in Hatran Aramaic as wrdn.

== Biography ==
In c. 40 CE, Vardanes' father and reigning Parthian king Artabanus II (r. 12–40) died, entrusting his realm to Vardanes. The throne was immediately seized by Gotarzes II, an adopted son of Artabanus II. Gotarzes had another of his brothers, Artabanus, along with his wife and child, executed shortly thereafter. An uproar against this execution quickly followed, with an appeal being sent to Vardanes, who took Gotarzes by surprise and defeated him, after travelling 375 miles (600 km) in two days. Vardanes was supported by the governors of the neighboring Parthian provinces, quickly gaining control over most of the Parthian realm.

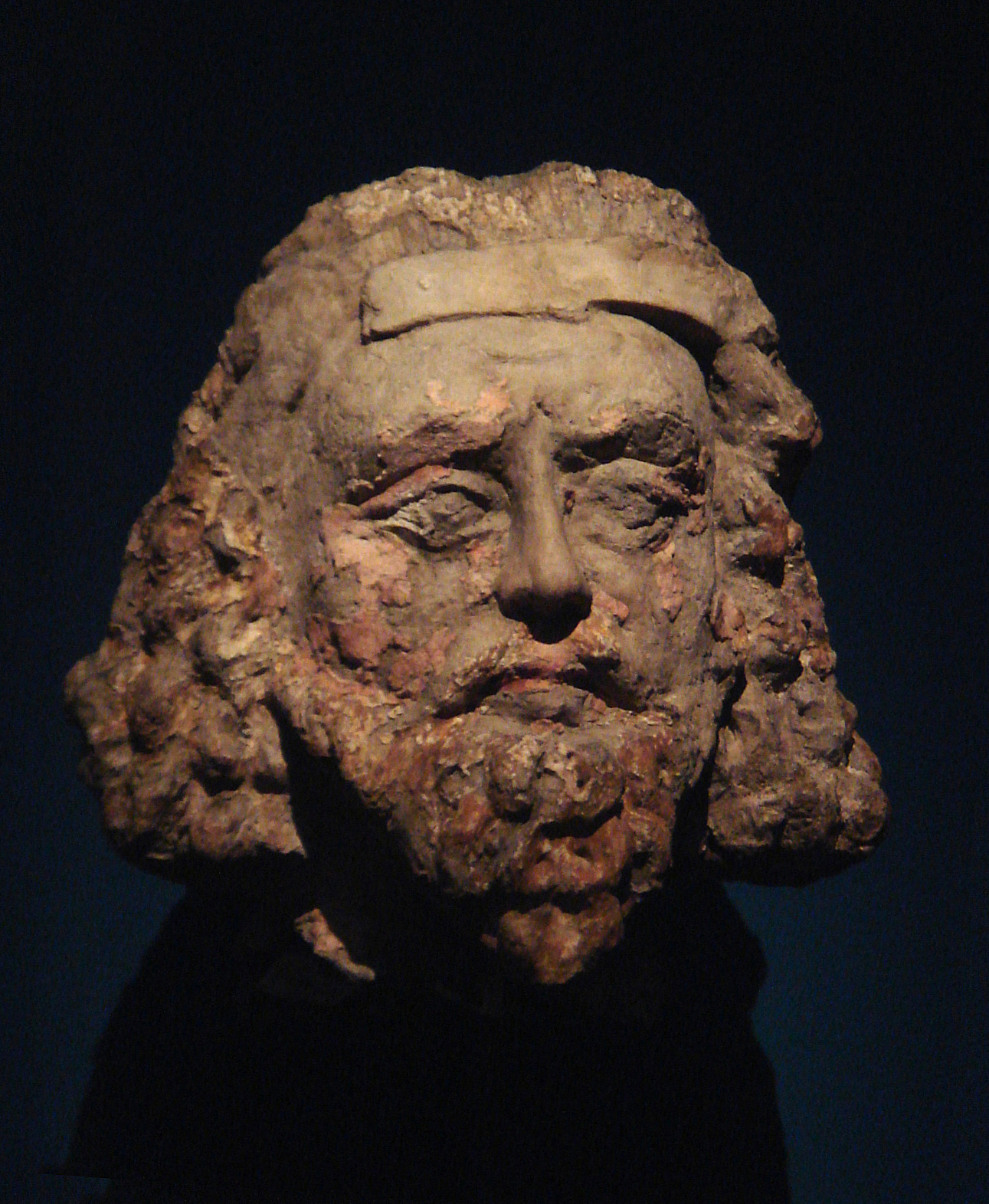
Portrait of a Parthian king, possibly Vardanes I, from Khalchayan.

The Mesopotamian city of Seleucia, which had been in rebellion since 35 CE, did not acknowledge Vardanes, who then besieged the city. The long siege of Seleucia resulted in Gotarzes gaining the upper hand in the conflict, however, allowing him to raise a new force and drive off Vardanes, who fled to Bactria in Central Asia. A contemporary bust of a Parthian king was discovered at the ancient court of the Yuezhis (early Kushans) in Khalchayan, Bactria, which is thought to represent Vardanes as he sought refuge, and possibly an alliance, at the Yuezhi court.

At the same time, Armenia suffered turmoil, when its Arsacid king Orodes, the brother of Vardanes, was deposed by the Roman emperor Claudius (r. 41–54), who appointed the Pharnavazid prince Mithridates in his stead.

Just before Vardanes and Gotarzes clashed in battle, they reached an accord after Gotarzes informed Vardanes of a conspiracy being planned against them by a prominent group. Under the accord, Vardanes was to keep his crown, while Gotarzes became the ruler of Hyrcania.

In June 42, Vardanes forced Seleucia to submit to the Parthians again after a rebellion of seven years. He significantly reduced the autonomy of the city and removed its privilege to mint its own coins. Around the same time, the Greek philosopher Apollonius of Tyana visited the court of Vardanes, who provided him with the protection of a caravan as he travelled to the realm of the Indo-Parthians. When Apollonius reached Indo-Parthia's capital Taxila, his caravan leader read Vardanes' official letter, perhaps written in Parthian, to an Indian official who treated Apollonius with great hospitality.

Encouraged by his recent triumphs, Vardanes prepared to invade and reconquer Armenia, but ultimately abandoned his plans, due to threats of war from the Roman governor of Syria, Gaius Vibius Marsus, and the renewed conflict with Gotarzes, who had terminated their accord. Vardanes defeated Gotarzes on the Erindes, a river situated on the Media-Hyrcania border. He then proceeded to conquer the remaining Parthian provinces, reaching as far as Aria.

In c. 46, Vardanes was assassinated while hunting at the instigation of a party of Parthian nobles, who feared that their status might become endangered.

== Bibliography ==
=== Ancient works ===
- Tacitus, Annals

=== Modern works ===
- Bivar, A.D.H. (1983). "The Political History of Iran Under the Arsacids". In Yarshater, Ehsan (ed.). The Cambridge History of Iran: The Seleucid, Parthian and Sasanian Periods. Vol. 3(1). Cambridge: Cambridge University Press. pp. 21–99. ISBN 0-521-20092-X.
- Bivar, A.D.H. (2007), "Gondophares and the Indo-Parthians", in Curtis, Vesta Sarkhosh and Sarah Stewart (ed.), The Age of the Parthians: The Ideas of Iran, vol. 2, London & New York: I.B. Tauris & Co Ltd., in association with the London Middle East Institute at SOAS and the British Museum, pp. 26–36, ISBN 978-1-84511-406-0
- Dąbrowa, Edward (2012). "The Arsacid Empire". In Daryaee, Touraj (ed.). The Oxford Handbook of Iranian History. Oxford University Press. pp. 1–432. ISBN 978-0-19-987575-7. Archived from the original on 1 January 2019.
- Dąbrowa, Edward (2017). "Tacitus on the Parthians". Electrum: 171–189.
- Ellerbrock, Uwe (2021). The Parthians: The Forgotten Empire. Oxford: Routledge. ISBN 978-0367481902.
- Gregoratti, Leonardo (2017). "The Arsacid Empire". In Daryaee, Touraj (ed.). King of the Seven Climes: A History of the Ancient Iranian World (3000 BCE - 651 CE). UCI Jordan Center for Persian Studies. pp. 1–236. ISBN 9780692864401.
- Lukonin, V.G. (1983). "Political, Social and Administrative Institutions: Taxes and Trade". In Yarshater, Ehsan (ed.). The Cambridge History of Iran: The Seleucid, Parthian and Sasanian Periods. Vol. 3(2). Cambridge: Cambridge University Press. pp. 681–746. ISBN 0-521-24693-8.
- Marcato, Enrico (2018). Personal Names in the Aramaic Inscriptions of Hatra. Digital Publishing. ISBN 9788869692314.
- Olbrycht, Marek Jan (2016). "Dynastic Connections in the Arsacid Empire and the Origins of the House of Sāsān". In Curtis, Vesta Sarkhosh; Pendleton, Elizabeth J.; Alram, Michael; Daryaee, Touraj (eds.). The Parthian and Early Sasanian Empires: Adaptation and Expansion. Oxbow Books. ISBN 9781785702082.
- Olbrycht, Marek Jan (2012). "The Political-Military Strategy of Artabanos/Ardawān II in AD 34–371". Anabasis. Studia Classica et Orientalia: 215–237.
- Olbrycht, Marek Jan (2014). "The Genealogy of Artabanos II (AD 8/9–39/40), King of Parthia". Miscellanea Anthropologica et Sociologica: 92–97. doi:10.5604/20842937.1134333 (inactive 1 July 2025).
- Olbrycht, Marek Jan (2015). "Arsacid Iran and the nomads of Central Asia – Ways of cultural transfer". Bonn Contributions to Asian Archaeology: 333–390.

Vardanes I Arsacid dynasty Died: 46
Preceded by Artabanus II	King of the Parthian Empire; 40–46	Succeeded by Gotarzes II
