= Annius Vinicianus (condemned by Nero) =

Roman senator (36 - 66)

Annius Vinicianus (36 – 66) was a Roman senator during the later part of the first century. He is best known from a failed plot to overthrow Nero in 66.

== Family ==
Vinicianus was the son of Lucius Annius Vinicianus, and the grandson of Gaius Annius Pollio, suffect consul in 21 or 22, and Vinicia. Vinicia was the sister of Marcus Vinicius, the husband of Caligula's youngest sister Julia Livilla.

Vinicianus married a daughter of the general Gnaeus Domitius Corbulo, and according to Suetonius (clause 12) they had a son.

== Career ==
In 63, Vinicianus served as legatus legionis in the Legio V Macedonica in the province of Armenia, under his father-in-law Gnaeus Domitius Corbulo. In this period he and Corbulo fought in the Roman–Parthian War of 58–63.

== Plot against Nero and death ==
Vinicianus came from a family of plotters against the Caesars. His father was one of the men involved in the assassination of Caligula and later in a rebellion against Claudius. His brother was Annius Pollio, who was involved in the Pisonian conspiracy in 65. In 66 it would be Vinicianus that plotted against Nero, but the conspiracy failed. Vinicianus refused to speak nor prove his innocence to the Emperor and killed himself in 67. Corbulo would also be forced to die by suicide.
