= Vardanes II =

1st-century CE Parthian prince and king

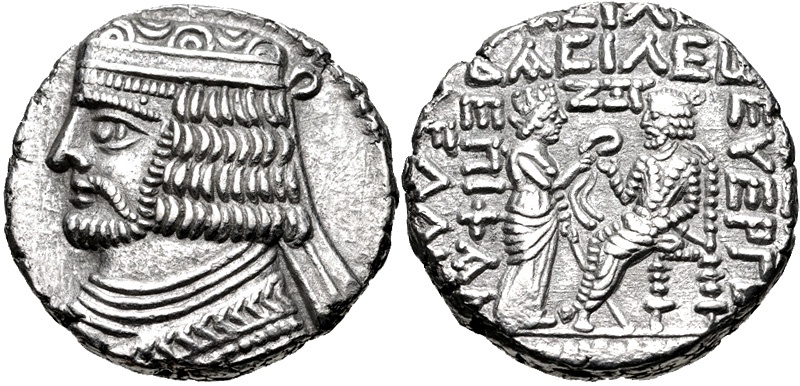
- Tetradrachm of Vardanes II, Seleucia mint

King of the Parthian Empire
- Reign: 55 – 58
- Predecessor: Vologases I
- Successor: Vologases I
- Died: c. 58
- Dynasty: Arsacid dynasty
- Father: Vologases I or Vardanes I
- Religion: Zoroastrianism

Vardanes II was the son of Vologases I or Vardanes I and briefly ruler of parts of the Parthian Empire. In ancient records he only appears in Tacitus. Otherwise he is only known from coins that are dated between 55 and 58 CE. He rebelled against Vologases I at Seleucia from about 55 to 58 CE and must have occupied Ecbatana, since he issued coins from the mint there, bearing the likeness of a young beardless king wearing a diadem with five pendants. The lack of facial lesions on his coins sets him apart from other Parthian rulers, many of whom were depicted with nodules resembling trichoepithelioma. Other than that nothing more about him is known.

== Sources ==
- Chaumont, M. L.; Schippmann, K. (1988). "Balāš". Encyclopaedia Iranica, Vol. III, Fasc. 6. pp. 574–580.
- Dąbrowa, Edward (2010). "The Arsacids and their State". XI: 21–52.
- Dąbrowa, Edward (2017). "Tacitus on the Parthians". Electrum. 24: 171–189. doi:10.4467/20800909EL.17.026.7508.
- Ellerbrock, Uwe (2021). The Parthians: The Forgotten Empire. Oxford: Routledge. ISBN 978-0367481902.
- Sellwood, David (1983). "Parthian Coins". In Yarshater, Ehsan (ed.). The Cambridge History of Iran: The Seleucid, Parthian and Sasanian Periods. Vol. 3(1). Cambridge: Cambridge University Press. pp. 279–298. ISBN 0-521-20092-X.

Vardanes II Arsacid dynasty Died: 58
Preceded by Vologases I	King of the Parthian Empire; 55–58	Succeeded by Vologases I
