= Vologases I of Parthia =

1st-century AD king of kings of the Parthian Empire

Vologases I 𐭅𐭋𐭂𐭔
- King of Kings
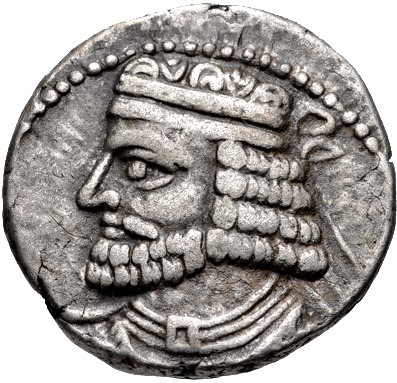
- The portrait of Vologases I on the obverse of a Parthian tetradrachm, minted at Seleucia in 52

King of the Parthian Empire
- Reign: 51–78
- Predecessor: Vonones II
- Successor: Pacorus II
- Died: 78
- Issue: Artabanus III; Vardanes II; Vologases II; Pacorus II
- Dynasty: Arsacid dynasty
- Father: Vonones II
- Mother: Greek concubine
- Religion: Zoroastrianism

Vologases I (Parthian: 𐭅𐭋𐭂𐭔 Walagash) was the King of Kings of the Parthian Empire from 51 to 78. He was the son and successor of Vonones II (r. 51). He was succeeded by his younger son Pacorus II, who continued his policies.

== Name ==
Vologases is the Greek and Latin form of the Parthian Walagaš (𐭅𐭋𐭂𐭔). The name is also attested in New Persian as Balāsh and Middle Persian as Wardākhsh (also spelled Walākhsh). The etymology of the name is unclear, although Ferdinand Justi proposes that Walagaš, the first form of the name, is a compound of words "strength" (varəda), and "handsome" (gaš or geš in Modern Persian).

== Background ==
Vologases was a son of Vonones II, a Parthian prince who ruled the northern Iranian kingdom of Media Atropatene, and possibly subsequently the whole Parthian Empire for a few months. Vologases' mother was a Greek concubine of the Parthian harem. The name of the Arsacid branch established by Vologases I has been coined by the modern historian Marek Jan Olbrycht as the "Vologasids" or the "House of Vologases I", which ruled the Parthian Empire from 51 till its fall in 224.

== Reign ==
=== Invasion of Armenia ===
Map of Parthian–Roman borders

Vologases became the new Parthian king in 51. He sought to continue the policies of the prominent former Parthian king Artabanus II (r. 12–38/41), and thus, one of his first objectives was to strengthen the Parthian position in strategically and politically unstable regions which had served for decades as the source of war with the Romans. He gave the kingship of Media Atropatene to his elder brother Pacorus, while the even more politically important kingship of Armenia was given to Vologases' younger brother Tiridates after a Parthian invasion of the country in 53.

Vologases felt his invasion was justified due to the recent usurpation of the Armenian throne by the Iberian prince Rhadamistus, which he saw as a violation of the former settlement made between the Parthians and Romans regarding Armenia. Lack of resources and a winter epidemic forced Vologases to withdraw his troops from Armenia, allowing Rhadamistus to come back and punish locals as traitors; they shortly revolted and helped Tiridates restore his authority. Rhadamistus himself returned to Iberia and was soon put to death by his father Pharasmanes I for having plotted against the royal power in order to prove his loyalty to Rome.

=== War with the Romans ===
Operations during the first two years of the war: Corbulo's invasion and conquest of Armenia

Unhappy with the Parthian reconquest of Armenia, in 54 the newly ascended Roman emperor Nero sent his general, Corbulo to restore Roman authority in the country. Vologases was unable to aid his brother, due to the rebellion of his son Vardanes II and subsequently a revolt in the eastern Parthian province of Hyrcania. Supported by Vologases, Tiridates sent flying columns to raid the Romans far and wide in 58. Corbulo responded by using the same tactics. He also emboldened the Roman client-kings Antiochus IV of Commagene, Pharasmanes I, and the Moschi tribes to attack outlying areas of Armenia.

The loyalty of the Armenian population was split up between the Parthians and Romans, although overall they preferred Parthian rule, due to it being more tolerant, and also due to the similarity between Parthian and Armenian culture. Corbulo conquered the Armenian capital of Artaxata, which he had destroyed. The following year (59) he conquered Tigranocerta in southern Armenia, where he wintered. Tiridates took advantage of this situation to return to northern Armenia from Atropatene. However, by the spring of 60, he was forced to withdraw by the Roman forces once more.

Operations during the final years of the war: the raids of Tigranes into Parthian territory provoked a Parthian counterattack, which culminated in the surrender of the Roman army of Pateus

Nero appointed a Cappadocian prince named Tigranes on the Armenian throne. The new ruler, protected by a strong Roman force, became bold and started in 61 attacking the border areas of Adiabene, a vassal kingdom of the Parthians. The Adiabenian king, Monobazos, including Tiridates, protested in front of the entire Parthian court, complaining that Vologases did not do enough to protect his subjects.

This situation was important and endangered the relations between Vologases and his subjects. During a public feast, Vologases supported Tiridates' appeals, and placed the royal diadem on his head. He also appointed a certain nobleman named Monaeses as the commander of a Parthian force that included contingents from Adiabene. Monaeses was sent into Armenia, where he besieged Tigranocerta in 62. The city was strongly fortified, and had been further reinforced by two legions. The Parthians attempts to scale the city proved fruitless, with the Adiabenian contingents suffering heavy losses.

At this point, Corbulo sent an envoy to Vologases, who had encamped with his court at Nisibis, near Tigranocerta and the Roman–Parthian border. The failed siege and a shortage of fodder for his cavalry forced Vologases to agree to withdraw Monaeses from Armenia. At the same time, however, the Romans also left Armenia, which, according to the contemporary Roman historian Tacitus, raised suspicions as to Corbulo's motives: some whispered that he had reached an agreement of mutual withdrawal with the Parthians, and that he was unwilling to risk his reputation by renewing hostilities against them. At any rate, a truce was arranged and a Parthian embassy was dispatched to Rome. The negotiations failed to reach an agreement, and war was resumed in the spring of 62.

The Roman government then sent Lucius Caesennius Paetus, governor of Cappadocia, to settle the question by bringing Armenia under direct Roman administration. Paetus was an incapable commander and suffered a humiliating defeat at the Battle of Rhandeia in 62, losing the legions of XII Fulminata commanded by Calvisius Sabinus and IIII Scythica commanded by Lucius Funisulanus Vettonianus. The command of the troops was returned to Corbulo, who, the following year, led a strong army into Melitene and beyond into Armenia, eliminating all of the regional governors he suspected were pro-Parthian. Finally in Rhandeia, Corbulo and Tiridates I met to make a peace agreement. The location of Rhandeia suited both Tiridates I and Corbulo. It appealed to Tiridates I because that is where his army had beaten the Romans and sent them away under a capitulation; on the other hand, it appealed to Corbulo because he was about to wipe out the ill repute earned before in the same location. When Tiridates I arrived at the Roman camp he took off his royal diadem and placed it on the ground near a statue of Nero. Tiridates I was recognized as the vassal king of Armenia; a Roman garrison would remain in the country permanently, in Sophene while Artaxata would be reconstructed. Corbulo left his son-in-law Lucius Annius Vinicianus to accompany Tiridates I to Rome in order to attest his own fidelity to Nero.

After Tiridates' visit in Rome, Nero summoned Vologases I to Rome several times, but when the invitations became burdensome to Vologases I, he sent back a dispatch to this effect: "It is far easier for you than for me to traverse so great a body of water. Therefore, if you will come to Asia, we can then arrange to meet each other."

== Later life and death ==
However, Vologases I was still satisfied with this result and honored the memory of Nero, though he stood in good relations with Vespasian also, to whom he offered an army of 40,000 horse archers during the Jewish Revolt. Soon afterwards the Alans, a great nomadic tribe beyond the Caucasus, invaded Atropatene and Armenia; Vologases I applied in vain for help to Vespasian, but did not achieve any decisive result. The Alans quickly withdrew with a lot of booty after plundering Armenia and Media Atropatene. Vologases I later died in 78, and was succeeded by his son Pacorus II.

== Government ==
=== Coinage ===
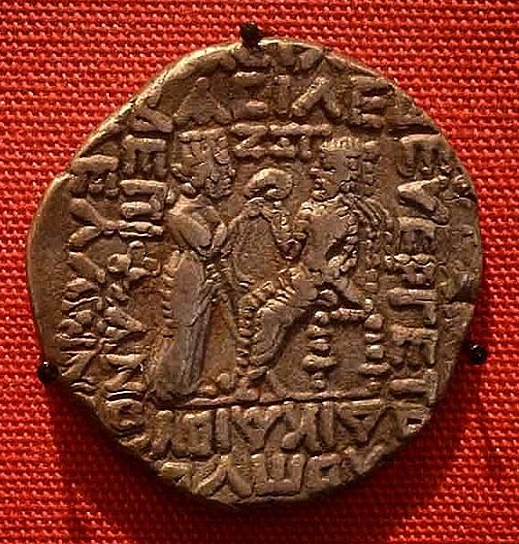
Silver tetradrachm of Vologases I facing left, receiving diadem from one of the female Iranian deities (yazata) Anahita or Ashi, standing with a sceptre.

Vologases was the first Arsacid ruler to have the Parthian script and language appear on his minted coins alongside the now almost illegible Greek. However, the use of Greek-alphabet legends on Parthian coins remained until the collapse of the empire. On the reverse of his silver tetradrachms, he is being invested as king by a female deity, representing one of the female Iranian deities (yazata) Anahita or Ashi. Both of these deities are closely linked with the khvarenah ("Divine Glory") of the monarch.

=== Trade ===
Vologases sought to accomplish the goal of Artabanus II, by attempting to establish a long and structured trade-route that spanned through East Asia, India and the coast of the Mediterranean Sea. This planned long trade-route would greatly improve the economy of the Parthian Empire. In order to accomplish this, Vologases strengthened relations with other powers whom he was able to establish long-distance trade with, most notably Han China. Vologases sought to impose his authority over the trade revenue of Seleucia, and was unrelenting against the Greek elites who questioned his rule. Vologases founded the town of Valashabad in the neighborhood of Ctesiphon and Seleucia, with the intention of breaking the Greek monopoly on trade.

=== Zoroastrianism ===
Vologases is an important figure in Zoroastrianism. According to the 10th-century Middle Persian Zoroastrian document Denkard ("Acts of Religion"), Vologases ordered his subjects to safeguard variants of the Avestan books and schooling, which had been scattered due to raids and plundering by the Macedonian king Alexander the Great (r. 336–323 BC) in the 4th-century BC.

== Family tree ==
Legend
Orange	Kings of the Parthian Empire	Yellow	Contenders

Vonones II (r. 51)
Tiridates I of Armenia	Vologases I (r. 51–78)	Pacorus of Atropatene
Pacorus II (r. 78–110)	Vardanes II (r. 54–58)	Vologases II (r. 78–80)	Artabanus III (r. 79/80–81)

== Bibliography ==
=== Ancient works ===
- Tacitus, Annals

=== Modern works ===
- Alemany, Agustí (2000). Sources on the Alans: A Critical Compilation. BRILL. ISBN 9789004114425.
- Bivar, A.D.H. (1983). "The Political History of Iran Under the Arsacids". In Yarshater, Ehsan (ed.). The Cambridge History of Iran: The Seleucid, Parthian and Sasanian Periods. Vol. 3(1). Cambridge: Cambridge University Press. pp. 21–99. ISBN 0-521-20092-X.
- Chaumont, M. L. (1986). "Armenia and Iran ii. The pre-Islamic period". Encyclopaedia Iranica, Vol. II, Fasc. 4. pp. 418–438.
- Chaumont, M. L.; Schippmann, K. (1988). "Balāš". Encyclopaedia Iranica, Vol. III, Fasc. 6. pp. 574–580.
- Curtis, Vesta Sarkhosh (2007a). "Religious iconography on ancient Iranian coins". Journal of Late Antiquity. London: 413–434.
- Curtis, Vesta Sarkhosh (2007b), "The Iranian Revival in the Parthian Period", in Curtis, Vesta Sarkhosh and Sarah Stewart (ed.), The Age of the Parthians: The Ideas of Iran, vol. 2, London & New York: I.B. Tauris & Co Ltd., in association with the London Middle East Institute at SOAS and the British Museum, pp. 7–25, ISBN 978-1-84511-406-0.
- Curtis, Vesta Sarkhosh (2012). "Parthian coins: Kingship and Divine Glory". The Parthian Empire and its Religions. Computus Druck Satz & Verlag. pp. 67–83. ISBN 9783940598134.
- Curtis, Vesta Sarkhosh (2016). "Ancient Iranian Motifs and Zoroastrian Iconography". In Williams, Markus; Stewart, Sarah; Hintze, Almut (eds.). The Zoroastrian Flame Exploring Religion, History and Tradition. I.B. Tauris. pp. 179–203. ISBN 9780857728159.
- Dąbrowa, Edward (2007). "The Parthian Kingship". History of the Ancient Near East / Monographs. XI: 123–134.
- Dąbrowa, Edward (2010). "The Arsacids and their State". XI: 21–52.
- Dąbrowa, Edward (2012). "The Arsacid Empire". In Daryaee, Touraj (ed.). The Oxford Handbook of Iranian History. Oxford University Press. pp. 1–432. ISBN 978-0-19-987575-7.
- Dąbrowa, Edward (2013). "The Parthian Aristocracy: its Social Position and Political Activity". Parthica. 15: 53–62.
- Dąbrowa, Edward (2017). "Tacitus on the Parthians": 171–189.
- Dąbrowa, Edward (2018). "Arsacid Dynastic Marriages" (PDF). Electrum. 25: 73–83. doi:10.4467/20800909EL.18.005.8925.
- Garthwaite, Gene Ralph (2005), The Persians, Oxford & Carlton: Blackwell Publishing, Ltd., ISBN 978-1-55786-860-2
- Gregoratti, Leonardo (2014). "The Parthian Empire: Romans, Jews, Nomads, and Chinese on the Silk Road". Journal of Late Antiquity. London: 43–70. Archived from the original on 2021-09-18.
- Gregoratti, Leonardo (2017). "The Arsacid Empire". In Daryaee, Touraj (ed.). King of the Seven Climes: A History of the Ancient Iranian World (3000 BCE - 651 CE). UCI Jordan Center for Persian Studies. pp. 1–236. ISBN 9780692864401.
- Gregoratti, Leonardo (2018). "Vologases I". In Bagnall, Roger (ed.). The Encyclopedia of Ancient History. Leiden: John Wiley & Sons.
- Griffin, Miriam (2000). Nero: The End of a Dynasty. Routledge.
- Kia, Mehrdad (2016). The Persian Empire: A Historical Encyclopedia [2 volumes]. ABC-CLIO. ISBN 978-1610693912.
- Marciak, Michał (2017). Sophene, Gordyene, and Adiabene: Three Regna Minora of Northern Mesopotamia Between East and West. BRILL. ISBN 9789004350724.
- Olbrycht, Marek Jan (1997). "Parthian King's tiara - Numismatic evidence and some aspects of Arsacid political ideology". Notae Numismaticae. 2: 27–61.
- Olbrycht, Marek Jan (2013). "Vologases I and Pakoros II in Parthia". 7: 280–286.
- Olbrycht, Marek Jan (2015). "Arsacid Iran and the nomads of Central Asia – Ways of cultural transfer". Complexity of Interaction along the Eurasian Steppe Zone in the First Millenium CE. Bonn Contributions to Asian Archaeology. Vol. 7. Bonn. pp. 333–390.
- Olbrycht, Marek Jan (2016). "Dynastic Connections in the Arsacid Empire and the Origins of the House of Sāsān". In Curtis, Vesta Sarkhosh; Pendleton, Elizabeth J.; Alram, Michael; Daryaee, Touraj (eds.). The Parthian and Early Sasanian Empires: Adaptation and Expansion. Oxbow Books. ISBN 9781785702082.
- Rezakhani, Khodadad (2013). "Arsacid, Elymaean, and Persid Coinage". In Potts, Daniel T. (ed.). The Oxford Handbook of Ancient Iran. Oxford University Press. ISBN 978-0199733309.
- Schmitt, Rüdiger (2005). "Personal Names, Iranian iv. Parthian Period". Encyclopaedia Iranica.
- Schlumberger, Daniel (1983), "Parthian Art", in Yarshater, Ehsan (ed.), Cambridge History of Iran, vol. 3, London & New York: Cambridge University Press, pp. 1027–1054, ISBN 978-0-521-20092-9.
- Schippmann, K. (1987). "Azerbaijan iii. Pre-Islamic History". Encyclopaedia Iranica, Vol. III, Fasc. 2. pp. 221–224.
- Shayegan, M. Rahim (2011). Arsacids and Sasanians: Political Ideology in Post-Hellenistic and Late Antique Persia. Cambridge University Press. pp. 1–539. ISBN 9780521766418.

Vologases I of Parthia Arsacid dynasty Died: 78
Preceded by Vonones I	King of the Parthian Empire; 51–78	Succeeded by Pacorus II
