= King asleep in the mountain =

Motif in folklore and mythology

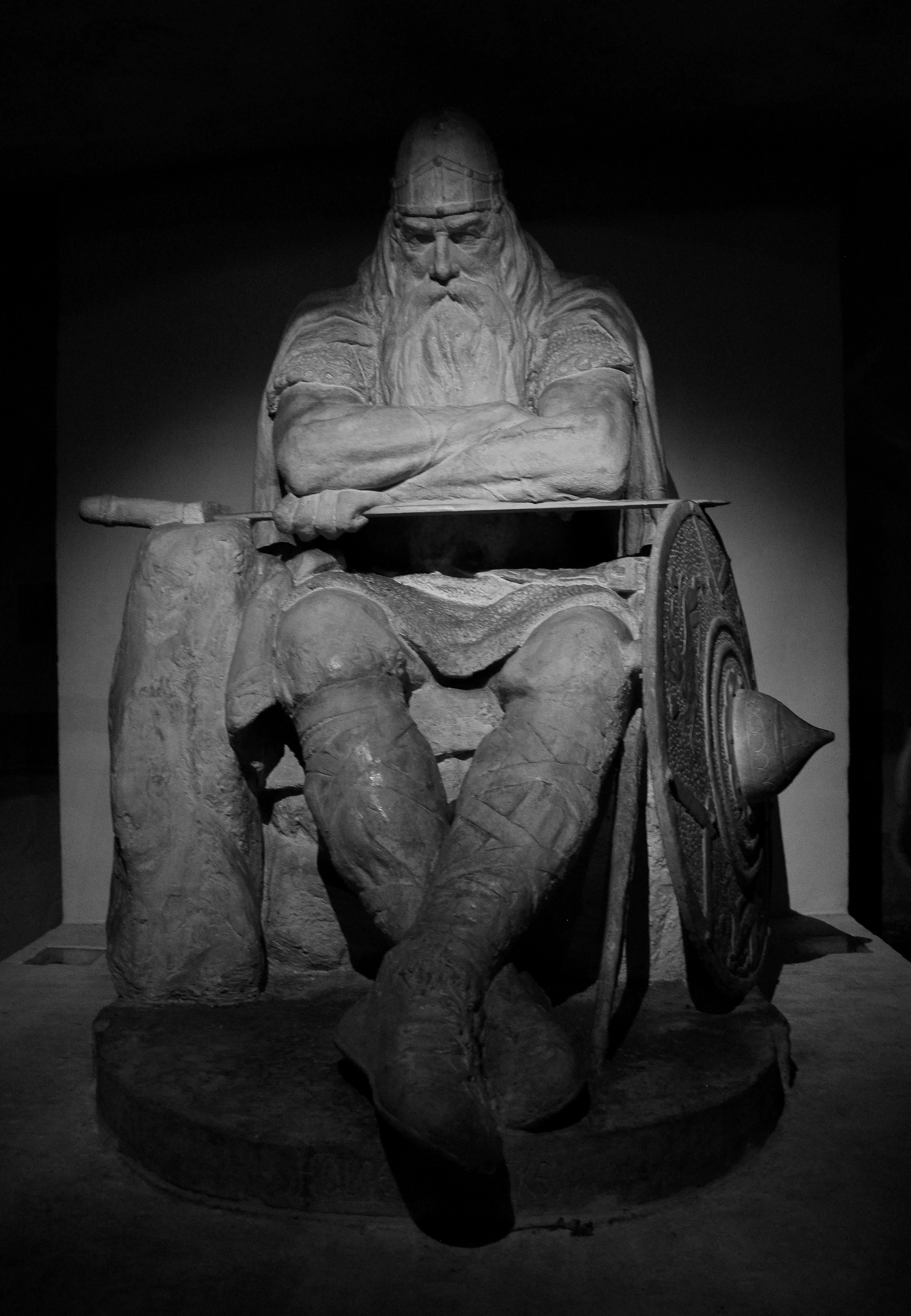
Statue of Ogier the Dane (Danish: Holger Danske) in Kronborg Castle, Helsingør; Ogier is said to sleep in the castle until one day when Denmark is in peril

The king asleep in the mountain (D 1960.2 in Stith Thompson's motif-index) is a trope commonly found in folklore and legends. Thompson termed it as the Kyffhäuser type. Some other designations are king in the mountain, king under the mountain, sleeping hero, or Bergentrückung (German for "mountain rapture").

Examples include the legends of King Arthur, Fionn mac Cumhaill, Charlemagne, Ogier the Dane, King David, Frederick Barbarossa at Kyffhäuser, Falanto of Taranto, Genghis Khan, Constantine XI Palaiologos, Kraljević Marko, Sebastian of Portugal and King Matjaž. Nero is also an example.

The Thompson motif entries A 571, "Cultural hero asleep in mountain", and E 502, "The Sleeping Army", are similar and can occur in the same tale. A related motif is the "Seven Sleepers" (D 1960.1, also known as the "Rip Van Winkle" motif), whose type tale is the Seven Sleepers of Ephesus (AT tale type 766).

== General features ==
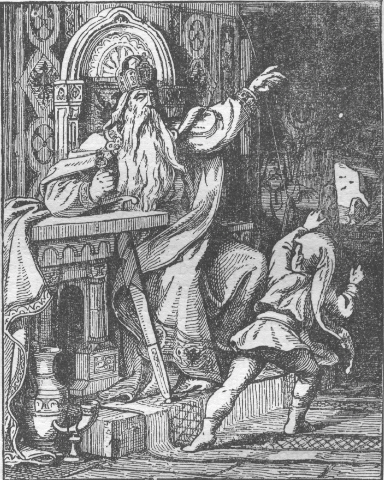
Frederick sends out the boy to see whether the ravens still fly.

King in the mountain stories involve legendary heroes, often accompanied by armed retainers, sleeping in remote dwellings including caves on high mountaintops, remote islands, or supernatural worlds. The hero is frequently a historical figure of some military consequence in the history of the nation where the mountain is located.

The stories gathered by the Brothers Grimm concerning Frederick Barbarossa and Charlemagne are typical of the stories told, and have been influential on many variants and subsequent adaptations. The presence of the hero is unsuspected; until some herdsman wanders into the cave, typically looking for a lost animal, and sees the hero. The stories almost always mention the detail that the hero has grown a long beard, indicative of the long time he has slept beneath the mountain.

In the Brothers Grimm version, the hero speaks with the herdsman. Their conversation typically involves the hero asking, "Do the eagles (or ravens) still circle the mountaintop?" The herdsman, or a mysterious voice, replies, "Yes, they still circle the mountaintop." "Then begone! My time has not yet come."

The herdsman in this story was then supernaturally harmed by the experience: he ages rapidly, he emerges with his hair turned white, and often he dies after repeating the tale. The story goes on to say that the king sleeps in the mountain, awaiting a summons to arise with his knights and defend the nation in a time of deadly peril. The omen that presages his rising will be the extinction of the birds that trigger his awakening.

== Examples from Europe ==
A number of European kings, rulers, fictional characters and religious figures have become attached to this story. Major examples are King Arthur of Britain, Charlemagne of the Franks, and Holy Roman Emperor Frederick Barbarossa, as well as Ogier the Dane and William Tell.

=== Baltic states ===
- A motif in Latvian legends involves a castle sinking into ground leaving a hill behind it. In legends that have someone enter such hill, the inhabitants of the castle are found in sleep-like state. If the visitor is able to guess the name of the castle, it is returned to the surface with its inhabitants awakened. The choir song "Gaismas pils" (The Castle of Light), which is part of Latvia's Cultural Canon, drew inspiration from these legends.
- Vytautas the Great in Lithuania is believed by some to rise from the grave to defend the country when danger threatens it.

=== Britain and Ireland ===
- King Arthur (Great Britain and Brittany). According to the legend, Arthur was taken away to Avalon to sleep until he was needed by the people of Britain. Several legends talk of a herdsman who stumbles across a cave on mainland Britain, wherein he finds Arthur sleeping, often with his knights and Excalibur by his side. In a variation on this, sometimes the exploring herdsman finds instead just Arthur's knights, or Sir Lancelot, Guinevere and the knights sleeping in wait on the return of the "Once and Future King". In early Arthurian literature, Arthur references his predecessor Brân the Blessed as having his head placed on a mound overlooking Britain so as to protect it. He wishes to do the same, and later they overlook and protect Britain together.
- Merlin of the Arthurian legend, who is imprisoned in an oak tree by Nimue.
- Thomas the Rhymer is found under a hill with a retinue of knights in a tale from Anglo-Scottish border. Likewise, Harry Hotspur was said to have been hunting in the Cheviots when he and his hounds got holed-up in the Hen Hole (or "Hell-hole"), awaiting the sound of a hunting horn to awaken them from their slumber. Another border variant concerns a party of huntsmen who chased a roebuck into the Cheviots when they heard the sweetest music playing from the Henhole. However, when they entered, they became lost and are trapped to this day.

==== Wales ====
- Brân the Blessed. Referenced as protecting the Isles and overlooking Britain; his head severed and placed on a mound. Arthur later says he wishes to do the same and in early Arthurian literature both guard Britain together.
- Owain Lawgoch, Welsh soldier and nobleman (14th century).
- Owain Glyndŵr, the last native born Welshman to hold the title "Prince of Wales"; he disappeared after a long but ultimately unsuccessful rebellion against the English. He was never captured or betrayed and refused all Royal pardons.
- An unnamed giant is supposed to sleep in Plynlimon.

==== Ireland ====
- Fionn mac Cumhaill is said to sleep in a cave/mountain surrounded by the Fianna. It is told that the day will come when the Dord Fiann is sounded three times and Fionn and the Fianna will rise up again, as strong and well as they ever were. In other accounts he will return to glory as a great hero of Ireland.
- The 3rd Earl of Desmond, who dozes under Lough Gur with his silver-shod horse.
- The 8th Earl of Kildare, who is at temporary rest under the Curragh of Kildare.
- Dónall na nGeimhlach Ó Donnchú, in legend around County Kerry.
- Cu Chulainn in Nationalist circles in Northern Ireland.

==== England ====
- King Harold II. In Anglo-Saxon legends he survived the Battle of Hastings and will come one day to liberate the English from the Norman yoke.
- Sir Francis Drake. Poems created shortly after Sir Francis Drake's death state he will come back as a dragon to destroy Spain. That his death is the rebirth of a new star, that will be the success of England and the bane of Spain. Alluding to his return when he is needed. It is stated that if England is in deadly peril and Drake's Drum is beaten, then Sir Francis Drake will arise to defend England from the sea. According to the legend, Drake's Drum can be heard at times when England is at war or significant national events take place.
- Knights asleep at Alderley Edge in Cheshire. There is an enduring legend of a cavern full of knights in armour awaiting a call to decide the fate of a great battle for England. There is no king named, but there is a wizard involved, who is referred to as Merlin in later versions of the legend.
- King Dunmail. A Cumbrian King said to be defeated at the hands of Edmund I of England and Malcolmn of Alba. Dunmail's warriors are said to have recovered his crown from the Saxons, climbing into the mountains to Grisedale Tarn below Helvellyn. where they then threw it into the depths to be safe until their king can return freeing them British from Saxon, Dane and Norman control. Every year the warriors are said to return to the tarn, recover the crown and carry it down to the cairn on Dunmail Raise. Bringing with them stones to complete Dunmail's cairn making it as tall as he is buried into the ground and when this task is complete his flag will rise again.

=== Caucasus region ===
==== Armenia ====
- Mher (see Daredevils of Sassoun).
- Artavazd I.

==== Georgia ====
- Legend has it Queen Tamar is not dead, but is sleeping in a gold-wreathed coffin in a mountain. According to it, she will wake up one day and restore the Georgian Golden Age.

=== Dutch and German-speaking realm ===
- Dietrich von Bern, legendary Germanic hero, was spirited away to the dwarf kingdom to return in the time of greatest need.
- Charlemagne, Emperor of future Germany, France, and the Low Countries, rests in the Untersberg near Salzburg (Austria).
- Frederick Barbarossa, Holy Roman Emperor, sleeps in the Kyffhäuser mountain and will rise to save the Empire (Germany).
- Frederick II, Holy Roman Emperor.
- Henry the Fowler, King of East Francia (Germany).

==== Switzerland ====
- William Tell (Switzerland, in some legends accompanied by two other Tells).

=== Greek, Hellenistic and Byzantine ===
==== Ancient Greece ====
- Theseus (Athens).

==== Byzantine Empire ====
- Constantine I, said to have been turned into a stone statue, although not resting within a mountain.
- Constantine XI Palaiologos, the last emperor of the Eastern Roman Empire, said to have been turned into marble and thus was known as "Marmaromenos", "the Marble King". He was said to be hidden somewhere underground, some say inside walled up Golden Gate of Constantinople, until his glorious return as the Immortal Emperor. Greeks believed King Constantine I of Greece was his return.
- John III Doukas Vatatzes (also known as "Kaloyannis III'").

=== Hungarians ===
- Csaba, the son of Attila the Hun who is supposed to ride down the Milky Way when the Székelys are threatened.
- King St. Stephen, King St. Ladislaus, King Matthias Corvinus.

=== Italy ===
==== Roman Empire ====
- Emperor Nero (Nero Redivivus)

=== Spain ===
- King Rodrigo, said to escape from the Moorish invasion and await for "the time of maximum need" to save his people.
- Montesinos. This legendary knight is said to be asleep in the Cave of Montesinos, Ossa de Montiel, Castile-La Mancha. Miguel de Cervantes makes Don Quixote descend into the cave where he falls asleep. In his dream he is met by Montesinos, Durandarte, duenna Ruidera and other fantastic characters. Don Quixote narrates that he saw neither of them eat or sleep.

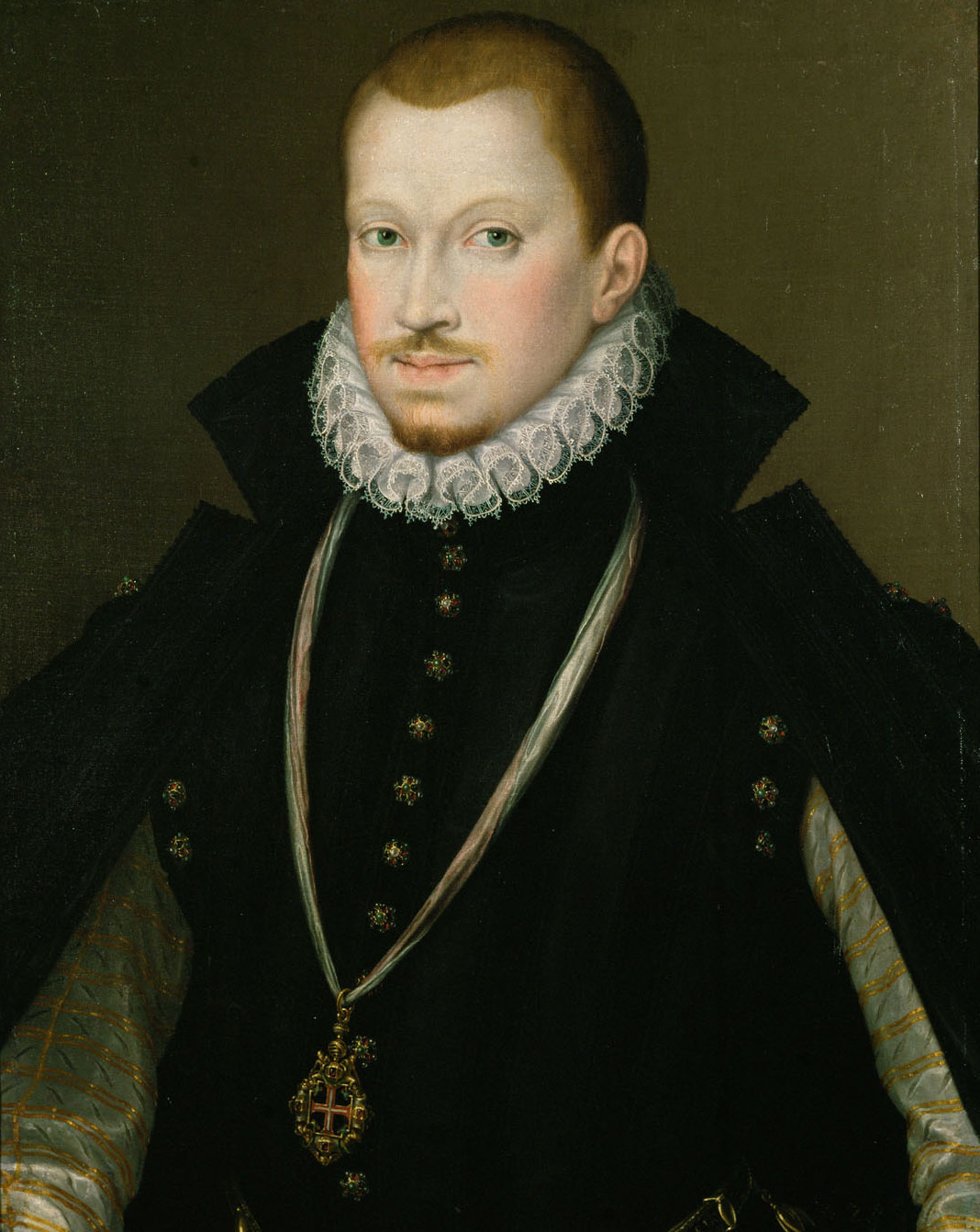
King Sebastian I of Portugal. With his death, the house of Aviz lost the throne of Portugal. Sebastianists hold that he will return to rule Portugal's Fifth Empire.

=== Portugal ===
- Sebastian I, who Sebastianists hold will one day return on a hazy morning in time of need, hiding in a mysterious island surrounded by fog until then.

=== Nordic countries ===
- Ogier the Dane (Danish: Holger Danske, Denmark).
- King Olaf II (Norway).
- Väinämöinen, the protagonist of the Finnish national epic Kalevala. At the end of Kalevala, he leaves on a boat, promising to return when he is most needed.
- Knights of Ålleberg (Sweden).

=== Slavic nations ===
==== East Slavic ====
- Alexander Suvorov (Russia), Russian generalissimo, sleeps in a deep cave where prayer is heard and icon lamp burns. The legend says Suvorov will come back to save his country from a mortal danger.
- Taras Shevchenko (Ukraine), Ukrainian poet and painter, believed to be a supernatural hero (charakternik), is said to sleep under his grave mound in Kaniv or even in the Kyiv Pechersk Lavra.

==== South Slavic ====
- Marko Kraljević (Serbia, Macedonia).
- Matija Gubec (Croatia).
- Kralj Matjaž (Slovenia).
- Napoleon Bonaparte was believed to be still alive and hiding in Irkutsk, Russia, gathering an army to return and conquer the world. According to a Romanian bishop Melchisedech, there was a Slavonic sect whose members shared this belief along with a widespread worship of Napoleon.

==== West Slavic ====
- Bolesław the Brave, king of Poland, asleep with a host of knights in a cave hidden somewhere in Giewont, a mountain massif which is itself said to resemble a sleeping knight. Several different versions of the legend exist, sometimes involving a different historical figure or another cave in the Tatra Mountains.
- Saint Wenceslas (Václav) of Bohemia (Czech Republic). He sleeps in the Blaník mountain (with a huge army of Czech knights) and will emerge to protect his country at its worst time, riding on his white horse and wielding the legendary hero Bruncvík's sword.

== Examples from Asia ==
=== Asia Minor and Middle East ===
==== Iran ====
- Kay Khosrow, legendary shah of Persia. The city of Shazand is said to contain a cavern system where Kay Khosrow is hidden along with other immortals. Legend says he will reappear and help Saoshyant in the last war at the dawn of resurrection.
- Shah Bahram Varjavand

=== Central Asia ===
==== Uzbekistan ====
- Qutham ibn Abbas, cousin and companion of Muhammad. According to legend, he was beheaded, took his head and walked into a deep well ("Garden of Paradise") where he lives until now. The area is now the necropolis of Shah-i-Zinda ("living king") in Samarkand, Uzbekistan.

=== East Asia ===
==== Mongolia ====
- A traditional tale of the death of Genghis Khan says he died falling from his horse while being injured, but that whether he died or not is unknown, and he may be merely resting. Every spring and autumn "those who know the secret" of where Genghis is buried are said to put new sets of clothes into his casket and take the old ones out, worn and frayed. Folklore reports another instance of evidence that Genghis would return: every year there is a sacrifice for Genghis Khan in the Ordos and two white horses (the horses of Genghis Khan) appear. In the third year of the Chinese Republic (1914), though, just one horse appeared. When the second horse came, four years later, it had saddle galls. This was taken as evidence that Genghis Khan had been using the horse, and was making ready to appear again.

==== China ====
- A traditional tale of the Chongzhen Emperor survived through the fall of Beijing and will reappear was widely spread in Qing dynasty.

==== Japan ====
- Kūkai, founder of Shingon Buddhism. He is said to be in deep meditation in a temple on Mount Kōya, Wakayama Prefecture, awaiting the coming of Maitreya, the next Buddha.

==== Philippines ====
- Bernardo Carpio, the "King of the Tagalogs", is said to be trapped in the mountains of Rodriguez, Rizal, east of Metro Manila on Luzon. Legend has it that Carpio, a man of superhuman strength, causes earthquakes as he struggles to break free of his chains.

==== Tibet ====
- Gesar of Ling, believed by the Tibetans to return one day and restore order on Earth.

==== Vietnam ====
- The temple of Trần Hưng Đạo, the supreme commander who defeated Kublai Khan's invasions of Vietnam, housed a sword chest that rung if the nation was in peril, but it also foretold victories.

== Examples from Africa ==
A king and queen are said to be sleeping in legendary desert city of Zerzura. Trespassers are warned not to wake them. According to the legend they will eventually one day waken.

== Examples from the Americas ==
=== United States ===
- The Pueblo hero-god Montezuma is believed to have been a divine king in prehistoric times, and suspended in an Arizona mountain that bears his image.
- The Sleeping Ute mountain in Colorado is said to have been a "Great Warrior God" who fell asleep while recovering from wounds received in a great battle with "the Evil Ones" (there are many other variants of this legend).
- Tecumseh of the Shawnee.
- Emperor Norton is claimed by several defunct civil rights groups to have been destined to return to the US when the unity of the Republic is at its nadir.
- Some adherents of the QAnon conspiracy theory believe that American figure John F. Kennedy Jr. will one day return to purge corruption from the American government.
- An urban legend claims that Walt Disney has been cryogenically frozen (with some versions, allegedly said only his head) and is stored under the Matterhorn Bobsleds or Pirates of the Caribbean rides at Disneyland.

=== Peru ===
- The Inkarri (from Spanish Inca Rey, "Inca King") of the indigenous peoples of Peru, who will return one day to restore the Inca Empire. There are two main versions of the myth with several local variations:
  - In the first, Inkarri was the last Sapa Inca. He was decapitated by the Spaniards, who buried his head in an unknown location. The head is not dead but hibernating while it regenerates the rest of the body. When the regeneration is complete, Inkarri will return.
  - In the second, Inkarri and his wife Qollari were the founders of Cusco. They fled to the Amazon jungle (to a place called Paititi, or variations thereof), where they sleep under rocks and will return one day.

=== Brazil ===
- The Pedra Bonita massacre was a massacre involving a cult of Sebastianists who believed the lost king was buried in a hidden kingdom underneath their settlement.

== Examples by religion ==
=== Judaism ===
- King David is depicted in Hayim Nahman Bialik's tale "King David in the Cave" as sleeping along with his warriors deep inside a cave, waiting for the blast of the shofar that will awaken them from their millennia of slumber and arouse them to redeem Israel. This role was not attributed to King David in earlier Jewish tradition.
- The body of the Golem of Prague is said to be hidden in the attic of the Old New Synagogue.

=== Christianity ===
- St. John the Evangelist – according to the Golden Legend, he is only sleeping in his grave at Ephesus until the coming of the Antichrist, when he would be needed as a witness.

=== Islam ===
- Muḥammad al-Mahdī (Shīʿa motif, identified with the mysterious son of Ḥasan al-ʿAskarī but occasionally other important figures in Shīʿa history like al-Ṭayyib Abū al-Qāṣim), sometimes called The Qāʾim) when identified with a historical figure as opposed to someone yet-to-come, the individual is endowed with unnaturally long lifespan and is said to be in occultation.
- Jesus, whom Muslims believe to be in occultation, will return alongside the Mahdi to defeat the false Messiah, the Dajjal. Though Muslims believe Jesus will return to Earth, this is not a resurrection, as Muslims do not believe Jesus died on the cross. Rather, Muslims generally believe that Jesus entered Heaven alive, and that he will return to Earth before the End of Days. See also: Islamic view of Jesus' death and Occultation (Islam)
- Quttham ibn Abbas. See § Uzbekistan

=== Druze ===
- al-Ḥākim bi-Amr Allāh (either died or disappeared in 1021 AD at the age of 35), is believed by the Druze to return at the End of Time to rule from Egypt.

=== Hinduism ===
- Viṣṇu is often depicted as asleep, woken up by the other gods asking for his help. His avatar Krishna informs Arjuna in the Bhagavad Gita that he periodically returns to Earth to establish order and justice. The Mahabharata specifically claims that Vishnu will appear in his tenth avatar of Kalki, yet to come, at the end of the Kali Yuga to rule as king.

== Sleeping anti-hero and villain ==
Sometimes this type of story or archetype is also attached to not-so-heroic figures, who are either simple anti-heroes or fully villains, whose return would mean the end of the world, or whose sleep represents something positive. This kind of archetype is known as the "Chained Satan" archetype. Among examples of this are:

- The Sleeping Giant mountain in Connecticut, United States was said by the local Quinnipiac people to be the demon Hobbomock, sealed by the Great Spirit. One day he will supposedly awaken and destroy the world.
- Artavasdes I of Armenia, who according to Moses of Chorene was chained and cursed to stay eternally chained by his father Artaxias I.
- Loki in Norse mythology was bound by the gods after he engineered the death of Baldr. With the onset of Ragnarök, Loki is foretold to be set free and fight alongside the forces of the jötnar against the gods.
- Gog and Magog in Christianity and Islam
- Dukljan (Serbian mythology).
- Typhon and Enceladus in Mount Etna.
- Tamamo-no-Mae (Sessho-seki)
- Sun Wukong (Journey to the West)

== See also ==
- Cthulhu
- The Chosen One (trope)
- Honi HaM'agel
- King Arthur's messianic return
- The Longing
- Seven Sleepers
- Sidhe
- Stasis
- Suspended animation
- Rip Van Winkle

== Bibliography ==
- Ó hÓgáin, Dáithí (1991), "Has the Time Come?' (MLSIT 8009): The Barbarossa Legend in Ireland and Its Historical Background", Béaloideas, 59: 197–207, doi:10.2307/20522387, JSTOR 20522387 JSTOR 20522387
- —— (1992–1993), "Migratory Legends in Medieval Irish Literature", Béaloideas, 60/61 (Finscealta Agus Litriocht: Paipeir a cuireadh I lathair ag an Siompoisiam Nordach-Ceiltech / Legends and Fiction: Papers Presented at the Nordic-Celtic Legend Symposium): 57–74, doi:10.2307/20522397, JSTOR 20522397
- —— (2000), "The Importance of Folklore within the European Heritage: Some Remarks", Béaloideas, 68: 67–98, doi:10.2307/20522558, JSTOR 20522558
