= Mancha Húmeda =

Spanish wetland area

Coordinates: 39°02′24″N 3°22′12″W

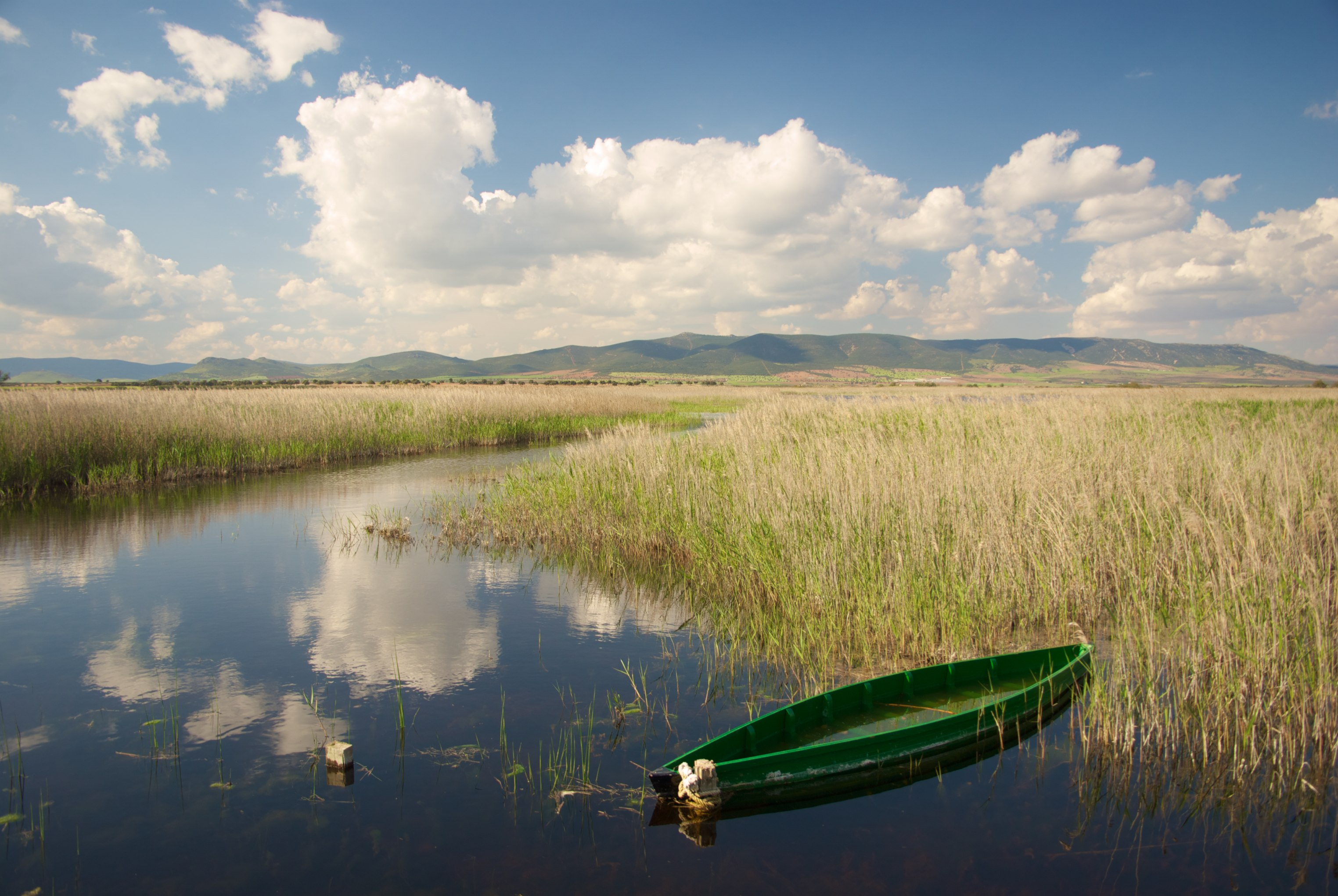
- View of the Tablas de Daimiel wetlands
- Interactive map of Mancha Húmeda
- Area: 25,000 ha
- Established: 1980

Mancha Húmeda is a Spanish wetland area which was designated a Biosphere reserve in 1980.

"Húmeda" means damp in Spanish and "Mancha Húmeda" refers to wetlands situated in La Mancha, a predominantly arid region of central Spain. The core area of the reserve is the Tablas de Daimiel National Park, a threatened wetland which continues to be important for its bird population. The buffer zone of Mancha Húmeda includes a natural park, the Lagunas de Ruidera Natural Park. The natural park, which is larger than the national park, is administered by the regional government of Castile-La Mancha.

== Conservation issues ==
Some conservationists have questioned the future of Tablas de Daimiel as an internationally protected area, because the site's eco-system has been damaged by over-use of water resources. In the twentieth century, groundwater in the area was used in an unsustainable way to develop irrigated agriculture, and it has proved difficult to implement a solution. In 2008, it was reported that UNESCO was giving Spain until 2011 to reverse the degradation of Tablas de Daimiel. At that time, a decision was to be taken whether to withdraw the park's biosphere reserve status, if sufficient progress had not been made in restoring it.

In 2009, subterranean fires broke out after a hot summer. The phenomenon of peat igniting underground occurs sometimes in the Guadiana basin, where the biosphere reserve lies, but this was the first time they had affected the core area of the biosphere reserve. In 2010, there were signs of improvement after heavy rain and inter-basin water transfers. The UNESCO moratorium was extended.

=== Restoration Plan ===
A Special Upper Guadiana Plan concerning the western Mancha aquifers was started in 2008 with a 5 M€ budget, to be operated for 29 years in order to restore the wetlands. This Plan consists of a "water bank" system that aims at attributing quotas on the basis of social and environmental grounds, taking into account the water use efficiency.
Analysis shows that there will be no notable improvement in the situation without considerably reducing the amount of land occupied by irrigated cereals. A more sustainable approach to agricultural production would involve:

- traditional crops suited to arid conditions, such as olives;
- horticulture (which is the most efficient in terms of extended water footprint, although it is arguably not a traditional use of the land).

The Plan includes provision for buying water rights from cereal producers to reassign them to illegal users, essentially small-scale horticulture and vine growers, which have been found to be more efficient in water use, generating more income per cubic meter of water used. However, in 2012 it was reported that funds had dried up for this operation because of the national economic crisis.

Within the frame of the EU's Common Agricultural Policy (CAP), cereals currently get more subsidies than other crops, although there are European subsidies for reforesting land which could aid conversion from cereal cultivation. The CAP is due for major reform in 2013. The choices that will be made then will be determinant for the future of the Mancha Húmeda. Another determining factor is the developing of other local economies, such as ecotourism, higher-quality agricultural products, solar electricity or environmental services (carbon sinks, for example).

== See also ==
- Lagunas de Ruidera
