= Lagunas de Ruidera Natural Park =

Natural park in Spain

- Parque Natural de las Lagunas de Ruidera
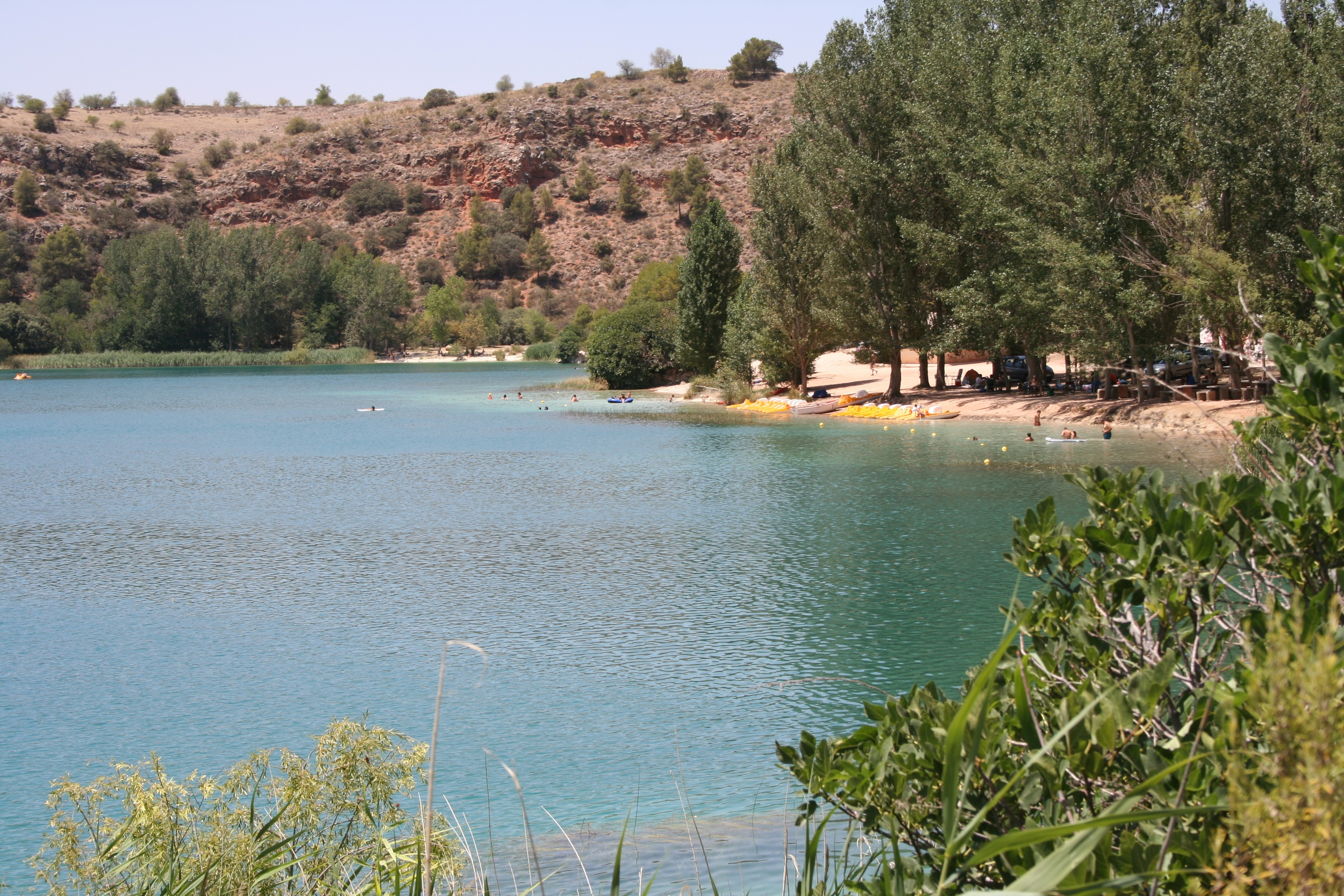
- Interactive map of Lagunas de Ruidera Natural Park
- Location: Castile-La Mancha, Spain
- Coordinates: 38°57′33.88″N 2°54′1.40″W
- Area: 3,772 ha (9,320 acres)
- Established: 1979
- Governing body: Junta of Castile-La Mancha

Ramsar Wetland
- Official name: Lagunas de Ruidera
- Designated: 23 September 2011
- Reference no.: 2069

Lagunas de Ruidera Natural Park is a natural park in Spain, containing 15 small lagoons, the Lagunas de Ruidera, that are located in the La Mancha plain. The park's area is covers roughly 38 square kilometres (15 sq mi), reaching into the municipalities of Argamasilla de Alba, Ruidera, Alhambra, Ossa de Montiel and Villahermosa.

The string of lagoons, plus the man made Peñarroya reservoir, are connected by falls, small streams and subterranean flows, stretching for 20 kilometres (12 mi), flowing from southeast to northwest. The entire system runs through the valley of the Upper Guadiana River, once considered the headwaters of the Guadiana, the fourth-longest in the Iberian Peninsula. The Upper Guadiana is one of many tributaries of the Guadiana.

The park area includes: the castle of Peñarroya; the ruins of the castle of Rochafrida; the Cueva de Montesinos where a passage in the Miguel de Cervantes novel Don Quixote has the eponymous hero spend a night; and the house of the King in the village of Ruidera.

Cervantes roamed this district as a tithe proctor for the Knights of St John at Argamasilla. In his novel, Don Quixote learns that the inhabitants of the Cueva de Montesinos – Guadiana and Ruidera, together with their seven daughters and two nieces – have been transformed into a river and string of "lakes" by Merlin the magician.

UNESCO has included the natural park within the biosphere reserve Mancha Húmeda. The natural park acts as a buffer zone to the core area of the biosphere reserve, the Tablas de Daimiel.

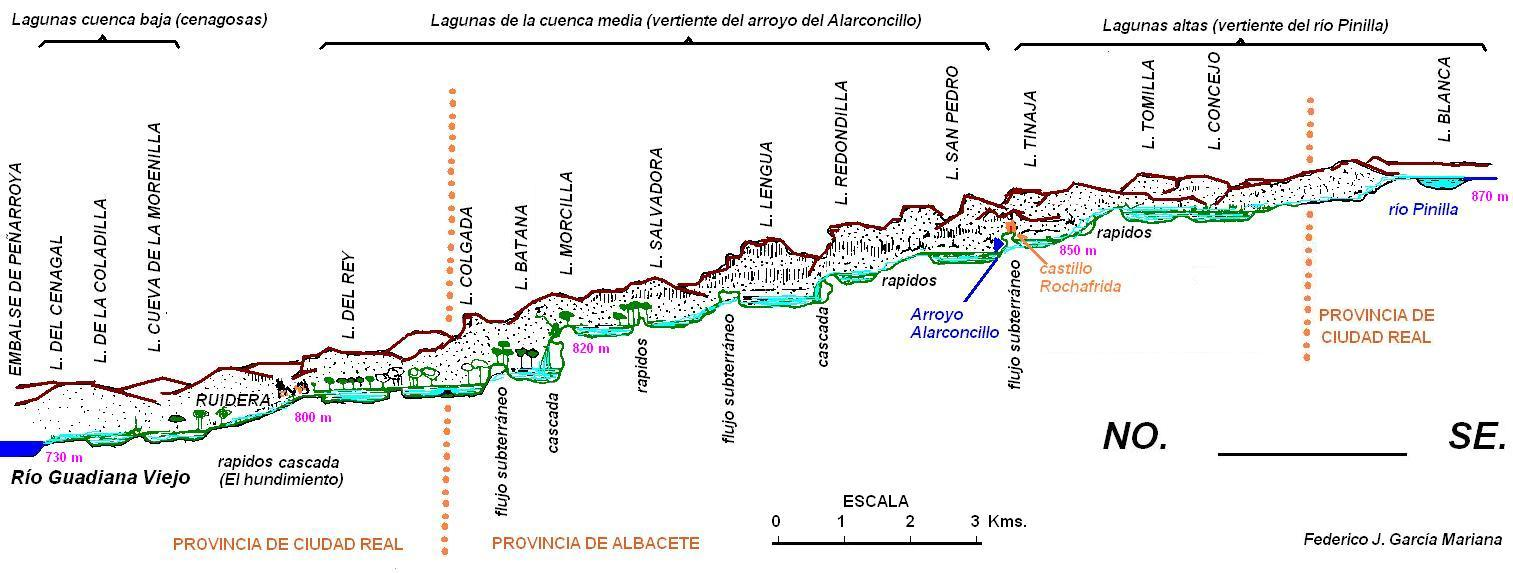
Cutaway view of the Lagunas de Ruidera Natural Park
