= Tablas de Daimiel National Park =

Wetland and national park in Spain

- IUCN category II (national park)
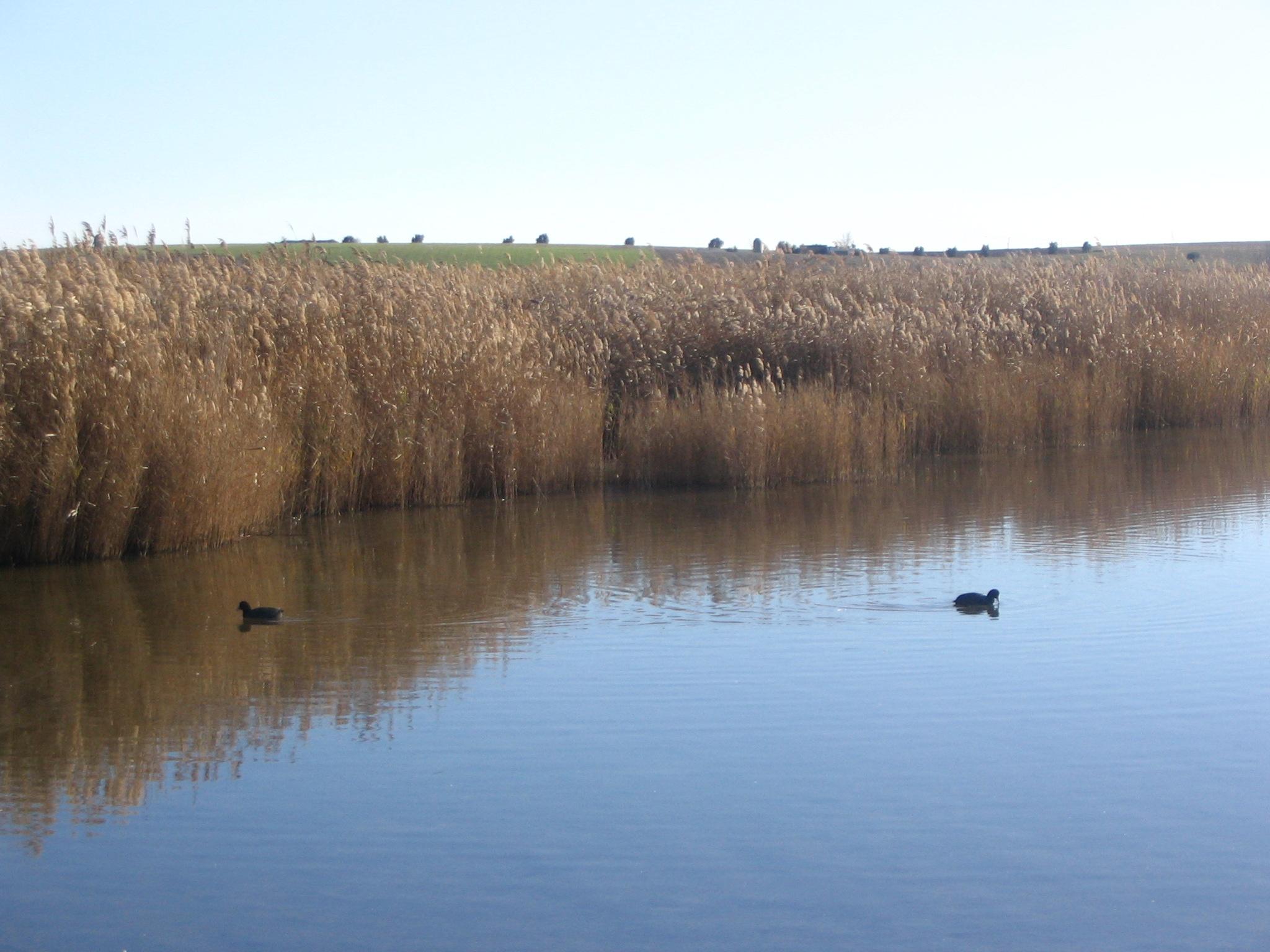
- Tablas de Daimiel
- Location of Tablas de Daimiel
- Coordinates: 39°09′N 3°40′W
- Area: 3,030 ha (11.7 sq mi)
- Established: 1973
- Governing body: Ministry of the Environment

Ramsar Wetland
- Official name: Las Tablas de Daimiel
- Designated: 4 May 1982
- Reference no.: 235

Tablas de Daimiel National Park (Parque Nacional de las Tablas de Daimiel) is a wetland on the La Mancha plain, a mainly arid area in the province of Ciudad Real. With an area of about 3,000 hectares, the park is the smallest of Spain's fifteen national parks, and its territory comprises part of Daimiel and Villarrubia de los Ojos municipalities. The protected area is in the process of being expanded outside the original nature reserve to include neighbouring dryland farming areas. The expansion is part of efforts to improve the condition of the wetland, which has been damaged by over-exploitation of water resources.

As well as having national park status, the site enjoys international recognition, being:

- a wetland on the list of the Ramsar Convention (1,938 ha)
- the core of the Biosphere reserve Mancha Húmeda
- a Special Protection Area for birds

== History ==
Like other Spanish wetlands, the Tablas de Daimiel had a long tradition of waterfowl hunting. As early as 1325 the infante Don Juan Manuel, in his hunting book (Libro de la caza), publicised the attributes of the banks of the river Gigüela for falconry. The water resources of the area also provided fishing and power for mills. In 1575, Philip II ordered the compilation of the Topographic Relations which commanded that the Tablas be well looked after. The value of the ecosystem for hunting continued to give the Tablas a certain amount of protection into the 20th century. Although in the 1950s the government promoted land reclamation projects in La Mancha with the aim of reducing the amount of wetland, Franco shot duck in the area and in 1966 the Tablas became a National Hunting Reserve.

In 1963 the International Union for the Conservation of Nature and Natural Resources (IUCN) launched a project to conserve and manage wetlands, the MAR Project, which drew up a list of wetlands of international importance as a foundation for an international convention on wetlands. The draft called for the protection of wetlands habitats rather than species. The Tablas de Damiel were declared a National Park in 1973. In 1980 the national park was extended and UNESCO included Las Tablas in a biosphere reserve. In 1982 Las Tablas were included on the list of the Ramsar Convention (an international treaty for the conservation and sustainable utilization of wetlands). In 1987 Las Tablas were declared a Special Protection Area for birds (Zona de Especial Protección para las Aves in Spanish) under the European Union's Birds Directive.

== Characteristics ==
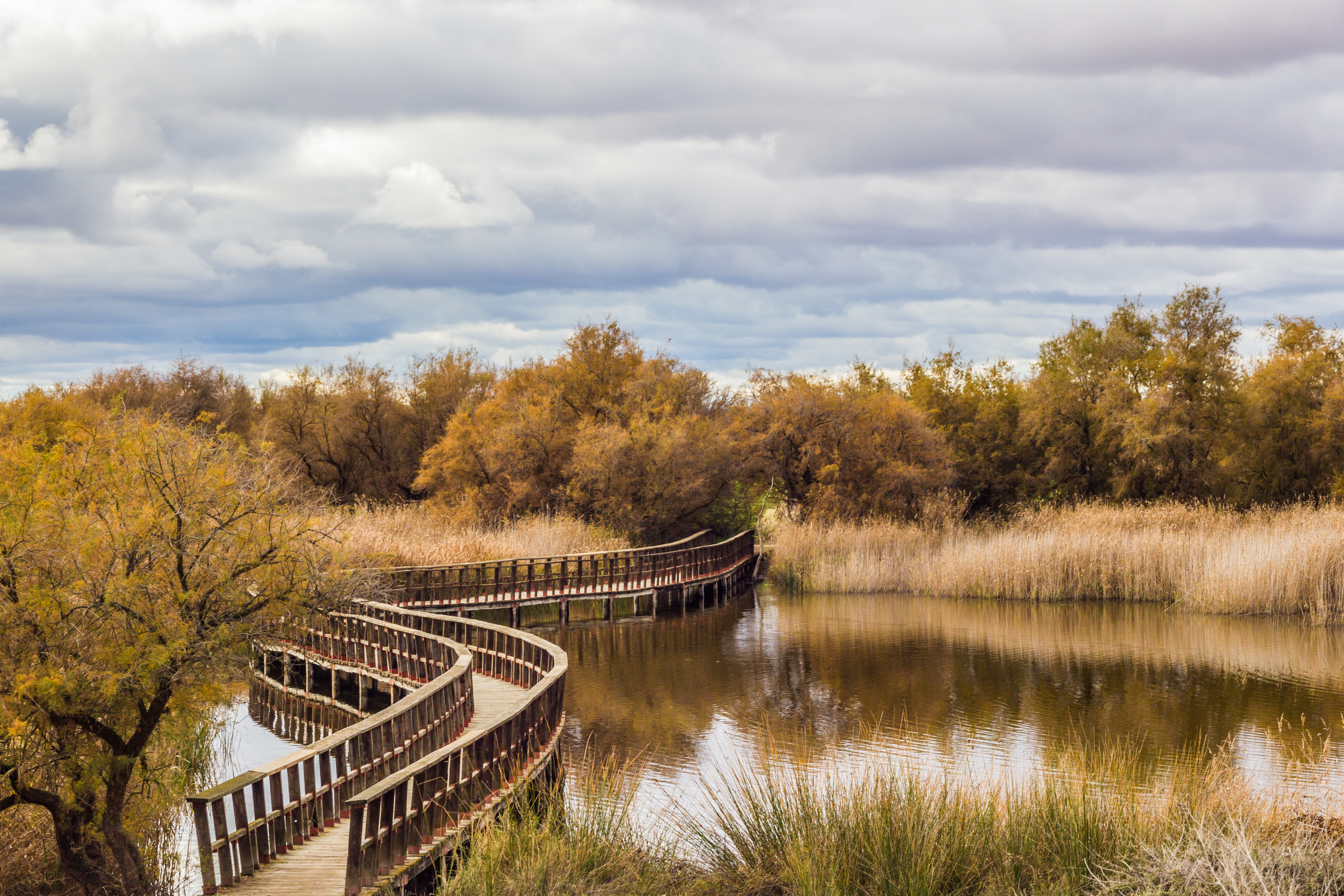
Bridge in Tablas de Daimiel National Park

The park is the last surviving example of floodplain wetlands located in the arid central part of the Iberian peninsula. Being located downstream from the Upper Guadiana Basin, TDNP play an important role in nutrient biogeochemistry.

The wetland landscape is characterized by recurrent seasonal inundation which until recently was maintained by both river flooding and groundwater discharges. The park's surface is 19.28 km², and the highest inundation comprises around 17 km^{2}. TDNP is one of the most important aquatic ecosystems of Spain and was probably the main inland wetland. It is important too because of the great amount of migratory birds that pass by the zone, like ducks and geese.

== Biological patrimony ==
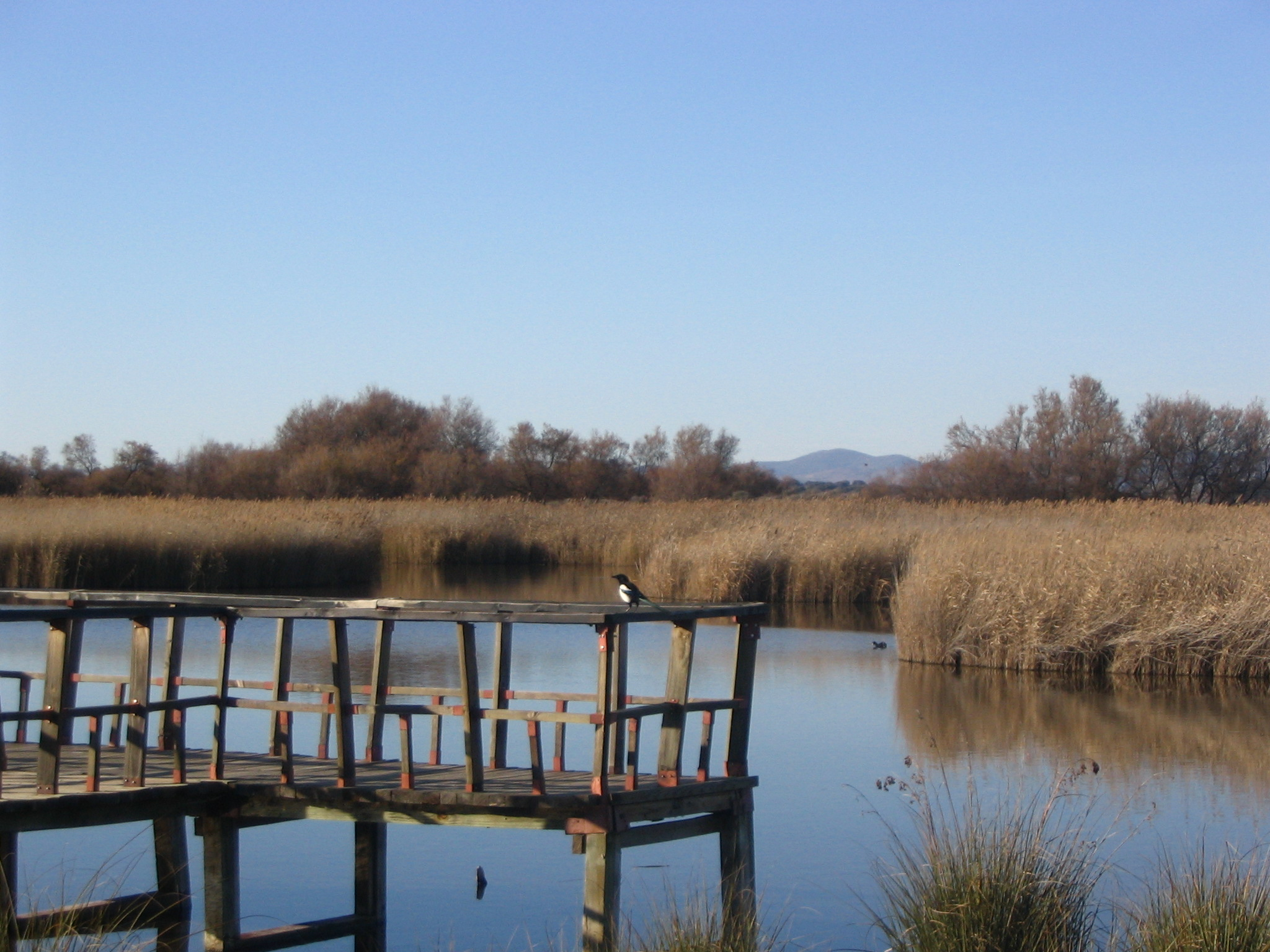
Tablas de Daimiel

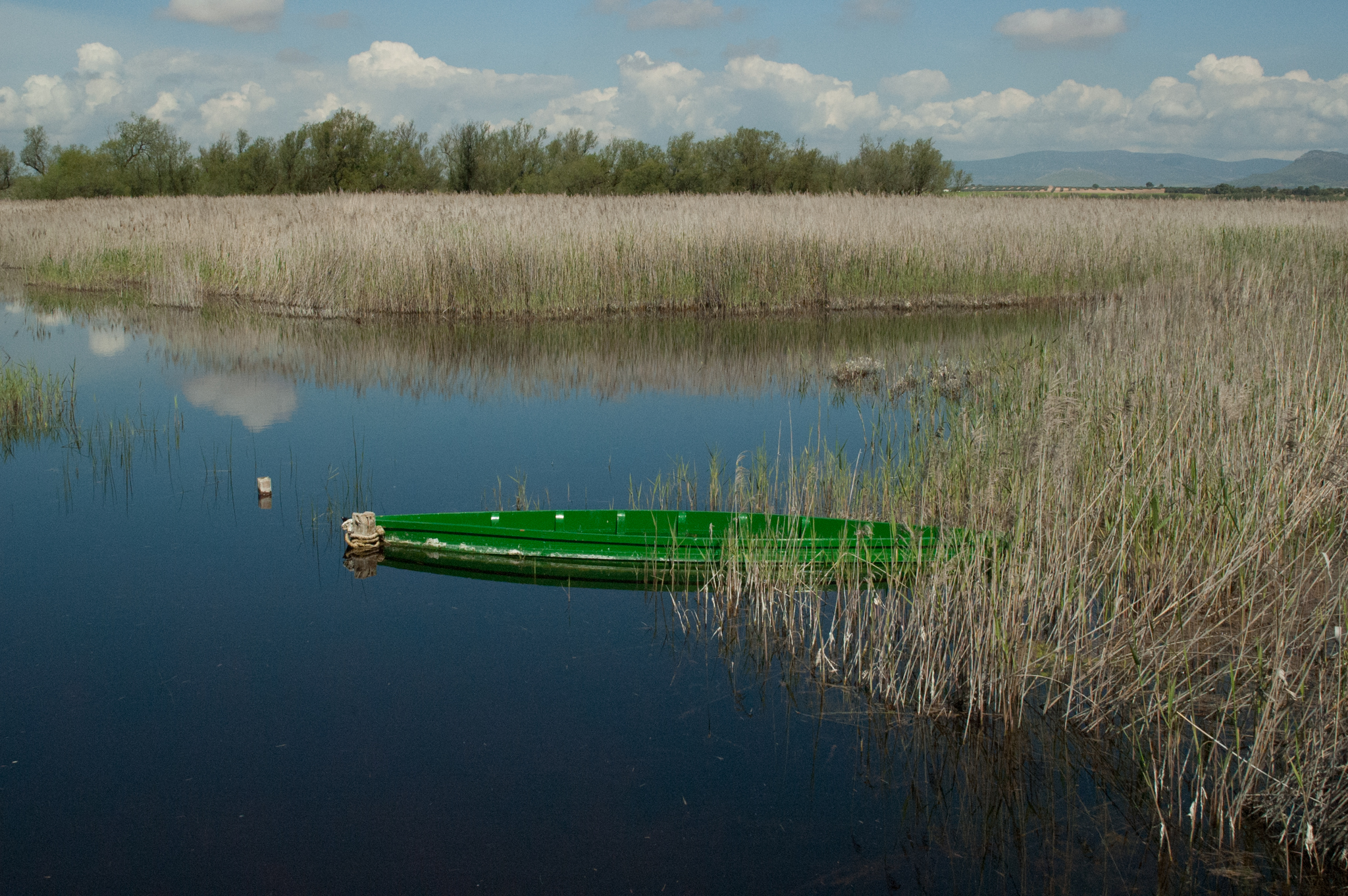
Tablas de Daimiel, Ciudad Real

Las Tablas de Daimiel are provided with two types of water making an unusual ecosystem: the Guadiana contributes fresh water, while its tributary the Gigüela is brackish.

=== Flora ===
The fresh water of the Guadiana favors the growth of the common reed (Phragmites australis, Phragmites communis), and the briny water of the Gigüela favors the growth of the marshy vegetation, principally the great fen-sedge (Cladium mariscus).

The great fen-sedge abounded extraordinarily, and it was one of the most extensive zones in Occidental Europe. There were groups of bulrushes (g. Typha, Scirpus lacustris, Scirpus maritimus) and rushes (g. Juncus) in the least deep areas.

Charophytes' grasslands are one of the most characteristic formations of the National Park, formed by different members of genus Chara (Chara hispida, Chara major, Chara canescens), also known locally as "ovas", and are able to form an almost continuous tapestry. The only trees present are the tamarisk (Tamarix gallica, Tamarix canariensis).

=== Fauna ===
==== Migratory fauna ====
Purple heron (Ardea purpurea), grey heron (Ardea cinerea), little egret (Egretta garzetta), black-crowned might heron (Nycticorax nycticorax), great bittern (Botaurus stellaris), red-crested pochard (Netta rufina), northern shoveler (Anas clypeata), wigeon (Anas penelope), northern pintail (Anas acuta), common teal (Anas crecca), Eurasian hobby (Falco subbuteo), Slavonian grebe (Podiceps auritus), black-necked grebe (Podiceps nigricollis), black-winged stilt (Himantopus himantopus), zitting cisticola (Cisticola juncidis), bearded reedling (Panurus biarmicus).

==== Resident fauna ====
We may find the European freshwater crayfish (Austropotamobius pallipes), that it was in the past abundant and an important source of income for Daimiel's families, today almost extinguished in these waters. After the introduction of the great predator that the northern pike (Esox lucius) is, other autochthonous species like the Barbus (Barbus barbus), the common carp (Cyprinus carpio), or the chub (Leuciscus cephalus) are now endangered species.

In the spring and the summer we may find amphibians and reptiles like the European tree frog (Hyla arborea), the Perez's frog (Pelophylax perezi), the common toad (Bufo bufo), the grass snake (Natrix natrix) or the water snake Natrix maura.

Also we may find mammals like the European polecat (Mustela putorius), the red fox (Vulpes vulpes), the European otter (Lutra lutra), the water vole (Arvicola amphibius), as well as the ones that live in proximities of the wetlands: the European rabbit (Oryctolagus cuniculus), the Cape Hare (Lepus capensis), the least weasel (Mustela nivalis) or the boar (Sus scrofa).

== Conservation issues ==
In recent years demand for water for agriculture in the area surrounding the park has reduced the amount of wetland. Overexploitation of water resources has caused the water-table to drop. The key aquifer ("aquifer 23") has not been able to refill because of the overuse of water created by the “Badajoz (irrigation) Plan” started in 1952, and of the administrative apathy and lack of suppleness faced with cereal farmers lobbies. The quotas assigned to water-users (about 590 million m3 water / year attributed) correspond to nearly twice the amount of renewable water (about 320 million m3 / year available).

Faced with a possible fine from the EU, the Spanish Environment ministry presented in 1995 a transfer project (an aqueduct and miles of pipes between the Tagus and the Mancha Húmeda) to bring water to the upper Guadiana basin. This extra water was to be used strictly for urban water provision and for the protected ecological zones, not for agriculture. But this project was badly received for two main reasons. Firstly because it assumed that the two depleted aquifers had no chance of recovering, and it chose the easy and cheaper immediate solution with no account taken of future water resources. Secondly because it aimed at replacing the natural hydric system, a principle that is too anti-natural to be easily accepted. Various conservation groups expressed the view that the solution should be found within the Guadiana basin.

Various ecological groups have suggested that the national park's designation as a biosphere reserve (within Mancha Húmeda) should be withdrawn as its ecosystem has been broken. In June 2008, a UNESCO report recommended that the national park lose its biosphere status or, alternatively, that Spain be given an ultimatum to reverse the degradation. In the event, Spain was given time to reverse the degradation.

A €5m, 29-year restoration project, the "Special Upper Guadiana Plan" concerning the western Mancha aquifers started in 2008. The European Union Water Directive requires wetlands to be in proper state by 2015. It grants some flexibility in particularly difficult cases like that of the Tablas of Damiel and the Mancha Húmeda in general - hence the 2027 limit date. This Plan consists of a water bank system that aims at establishing quotas on the basis of social and environmental grounds while taking into account the efficiency of water use.

In May 2009 a plan was announced to reverse the decline in the wetland area using recycled water. However, some skepticism was shown by environmentalists who noted that the aquifer was not going to be replenished.

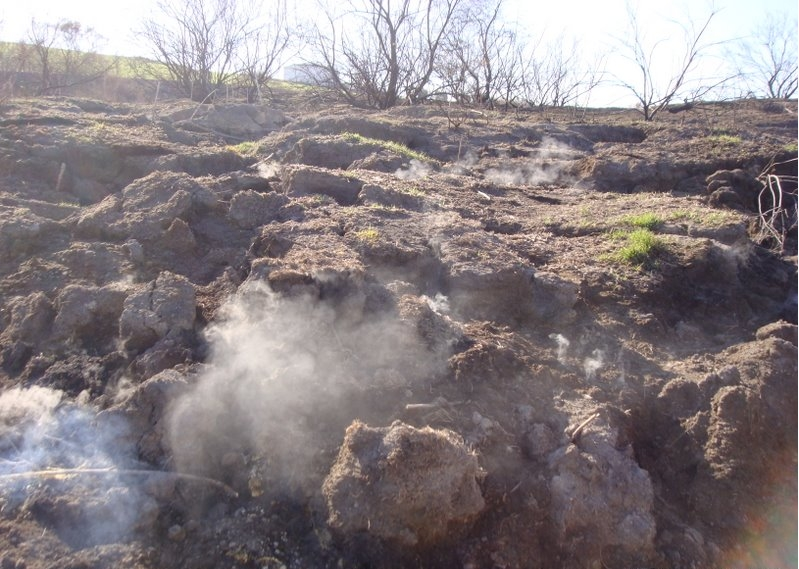
Subterranean Peat Fire (2009)

In the hot summer of 2009, smouldering dry peat fires broke out in the area. Such fires were not a new phenomenon in the region; they had affected the peatlands alongside the Guadiana in previous years, but by reappearing in the National Park, the fires represented another symptom of the wetland's degradation.

Early in 2010 the situation was apparently improved by heavier rainfall than had been experienced for several years. However, analysis later showed that there will be no notable improvement in the situation without considerably reducing the surface area of irrigated cereals while maintaining the same surface area of traditional crops suited to arid conditions (agricultura de secano in Spanish) and horticulture (the latter being the most efficient crop in terms of extended water footprint). The Plan also includes buying water rights. This gives scope to use water for the benefit of the national park and also to reassign water quotas in favour of more efficient use than cereal production, including hitherto illegal users, essentially small producers of vines and horticulture which have been found more efficient in water use and generate more income per cubic meter of water used.

Still, in the context of Spain's continued economic difficulties, funds have been lacking for this operation.

European subsidies are attributed in priority to reforesting land after forests were felled for the production of cereals during the preceding generations. Moreover, within the frame of Europe's present Common Agricultural Policy (in 2010) cereals get more subsidies than other crops. A revision of that policy is due in 2013, which will determine the future of the Mancha Húmeda. Developments in the local economy will also influence the outcome, with factors such as solar electricity, ecotourism, better quality agricultural products, and environmental services (carbon sinks for example).

== See also ==
- Lagunas de Ruidera
