= Clemens (impostor) =

Roman slave and imposter for Agrippa Postumus

Vipsanius Clemens (Note: His praenomen is not known; freedmen tended to use the praenomen (first name) of their manumiter (in this case Marcus), but that was not always the case.) (died 16 AD) was an impostor in Ancient Rome, who attempted to impersonate the Roman emperor Augustus' grandson Postumus Agrippa (Marcus Vipsanius Agrippa Postumus). He afterwards also became known as pseudo-Agrippa.

== Biography ==
He was a former slave of Agrippa Postumus, the grandson of Augustus, who was killed around when Tiberius came to power. Clemens appeared claiming that he really was Postumus, and gained a significant band of followers but was captured and executed by Tiberius. It is reputed that when he was brought before Tiberius, he was asked, "How did you become Agrippa?" Clemens replied, "The same way you became Caesar".

The same year a certain Clemens, who had been a slave of Agrippa and resembled him to a certain extent, pretended to be Agrippa himself. He went to Gaul and won many to his cause there and many later in Italy, and finally he marched upon Rome with the avowed intention of recovering the dominion of his grandfather. The population of the city became excited at this, and not a few joined his cause; but Tiberius got him into his hands by a ruse with the aid of some persons who pretended to sympathize with this upstart. He thereupon tortured him, in order to learn something about his fellow-conspirators. Then, when the other would not utter a word, he asked him: "How did you come to be Agrippa?" And he replied: "In the same way as you came to be Caesar."

— Cassius Dio

Meyer Reinhold noted a magistrate at Verona in Venetia and Histria in 1 BC named Sextus Vipsanius Clemens, who was the son of a Marcus Vipsanius, and was possibly associated with Clemens the impostor. August Pauly proposed that the man could be the impostor's son. Anthony A. Barrett believes the two should not be assumed to be the same man. Ralf Scharf states in his work Agrippa Postumus: Splitter einer historischen Figur that "Clemens" is simply too common a name for there to be any certain connection.

== In fiction ==
Robert Graves, in his novel I, Claudius, makes the suggestion that the person really was Postumus. That was not included in the 1976 television adaptation, which does not include Clemens and instead explicitly shows Postumus being killed in exile.

== See also ==
- Pseudo-Alexios II
- Pseudo-Apuleius
- Pseudo-Marius
- Pseudo-Nero
- Pseudo-Plutarch
