= Villa Tritone =

- Villa Tritone in Sorrento
- Click on the map for a fullscreen view
- Alternative names: Villa Astor

General information
- Location: Sorrento, Italy
- Coordinates: 40°37′41.65″N 14°22′04.65″E

Villa Tritone (also known as Villa Astor) is a villa in Sorrento, Italy. The villa is located on a cliff overlooking the Gulf of Naples.

== History ==
Agrippa Postumus, a grandson of Emperor Augustus, was one of the first residents of the property where Villa Astor stands today. The villa he built was destroyed along with Pompeii in 79 CE.

The existing villa is believed to date back to the 16th century when the Labonia family, a noble family from Calabria, acquired the property and had a residence built there. However, the site is marked by the presence of even older structures dating back to the Augustan age.

The villa assumed its current appearance during the period when it belonged to William Waldorf Astor, who purchased it in 1905. He especially took care of the property's park, giving it the characteristics of an English garden.

During the Second World War, between 1943 and 1945, the residence served as the Dutch embassy. During that period, Italian intellectual Benedetto Croce resided in the villa.

== Gardens of Villa Astor ==
The gardens of Villa Astor developed over several historical phases, reflecting the long occupation of the site. In antiquity, the Roman villa likely included terraced gardens typical of elite coastal residences on the Sorrentine Peninsula. During the medieval period, when the site was associated with monastic use, the grounds were adapted for agricultural cultivation, including olives, citrus, and medicinal plants.

In the 19th century, the estate already featured ornamental plantings and terraced landscaping. A major redesign was undertaken after 1905 by William Waldorf Astor, who transformed the grounds into an extensive botanical and landscape garden. The design combined Italian terrace gardening with English landscape influences and introduced a wide variety of exotic plant species, including palms and subtropical specimens. The gardens were further embellished with classical sculptures and architectural fragments, many derived from archaeological contexts.

By the early 20th century, the gardens had become a large, multi-level landscape overlooking the Gulf of Naples, integrating ornamental planting with panoramic viewpoints. Subsequent maintenance throughout the 20th century preserved the structure of the gardens, though periods of decline occurred following changes in ownership.

In the 21st century, restoration works were led by gardener Aivars Zvidris, who directed the recovery of overgrown areas, the rehabilitation of historic garden layouts, and the re-establishment of botanical structure consistent with the original design intent. His work at Villa Astor has been associated with the preservation of sightlines, renewal of planting schemes, and long-term conservation of the garden’s layered historical character.

Today, the gardens are maintained by Aivars Zvidris gardening team, with an emphasis on conservation and restoration aligned with the historic landscape design.
