= Villahermosa, Ciudad Real =

Villahermosa
- Municipality
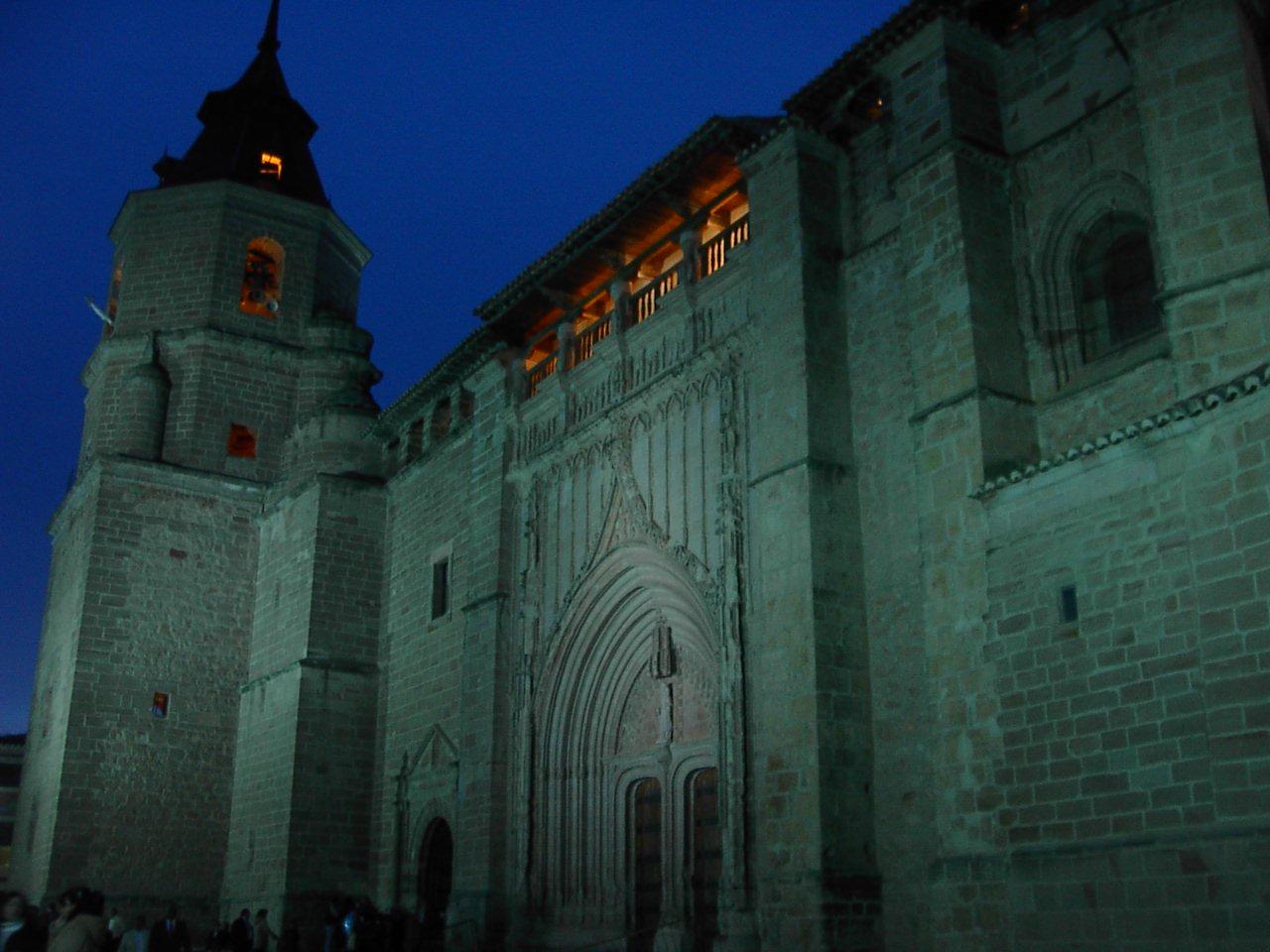
- Church of Villahermosa

- Flag Coat of arms

- Location of Villahermosa in Spain. Villahermosa (Castilla-La Mancha)
- Coordinates: 38°45′N 2°52′W
- Country: Spain
- Autonomous Community: Castile-La Mancha
- Province: Province of Ciudad Real

Government
  - Mayor: Ángel Cano Nieto (PSOE)

Area
  - Total: 363.01 km^{2} (140.16 sq mi)

Population (2024)
  - Total: 1,718
  - Density: 4.733/km^{2} (12.26/sq mi)
- Demonym: Villahermoseño/a
- Time zone: UTC+1 (CET)
  - Summer (DST): UTC+2 (CEST)
- Postal code: 13332
- Website: www.villahermosa.es

Villahermosa is a municipality located in the Province of Ciudad Real, Castile-La Mancha, Spain. It has a population of 1,718.

The Lagunas de Ruidera are located within this town's municipal term.
