= Artabanus III of Parthia =

1st century Parthian prince and claimant to the Parthian throne

Artabanus III 𐭍𐭐𐭕𐭓
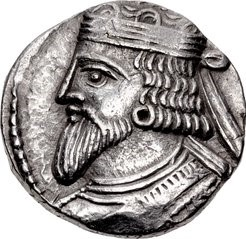
- Coin of Artabanus III, minted at Seleucia in 80/1.

King of the Parthian Empire
- Reign: 79/80 – 81
- Predecessor: Pacorus II
- Successor: Pacorus II
- Died: 81
- Father: Vologases I
- Religion: Zoroastrianism

Artabanus III (Parthian: 𐭍𐭐𐭕𐭓 Ardawān), incorrectly known in older scholarship as Artabanus IV, was a Parthian prince who competed against his brother Pacorus II (r. 78–110) for the Parthian crown from 79/80 to 81. Artabanus III's claim to the throne seems to have little support in the Parthian Empire, with the exception of Babylonia. Artabanus III's most notable action was to give refuge to a Pseudo-Nero named Terentius Maximus. Artabanus III initially agreed to lend military aid to Terentius Maximus to capture Rome, until he found about the real identity of the impostor. Coin mints of Artabanus III disappear after 81, which suggests that Pacorus II had defeated him.

== Sources ==
- Kia, Mehrdad (2016). The Persian Empire: A Historical Encyclopedia. ABC-CLIO. ISBN 978-1610693912. (2 volumes)
- Schippmann, K. (1986). "Artabanus (Arsacid kings)". Encyclopaedia Iranica, Vol. II, Fasc. 6. pp. 647–650.

Artabanus III of Parthia Arsacid dynasty Died: 81
Preceded by Pacorus II	King of the Parthian Empire; 79/80–81	Succeeded by Pacorus II
