= Ruidera =

Municipality in Ciudad Real, Castile-La Mancha, Spain

Coordinates: 38°58′48″N 2°53′35″W

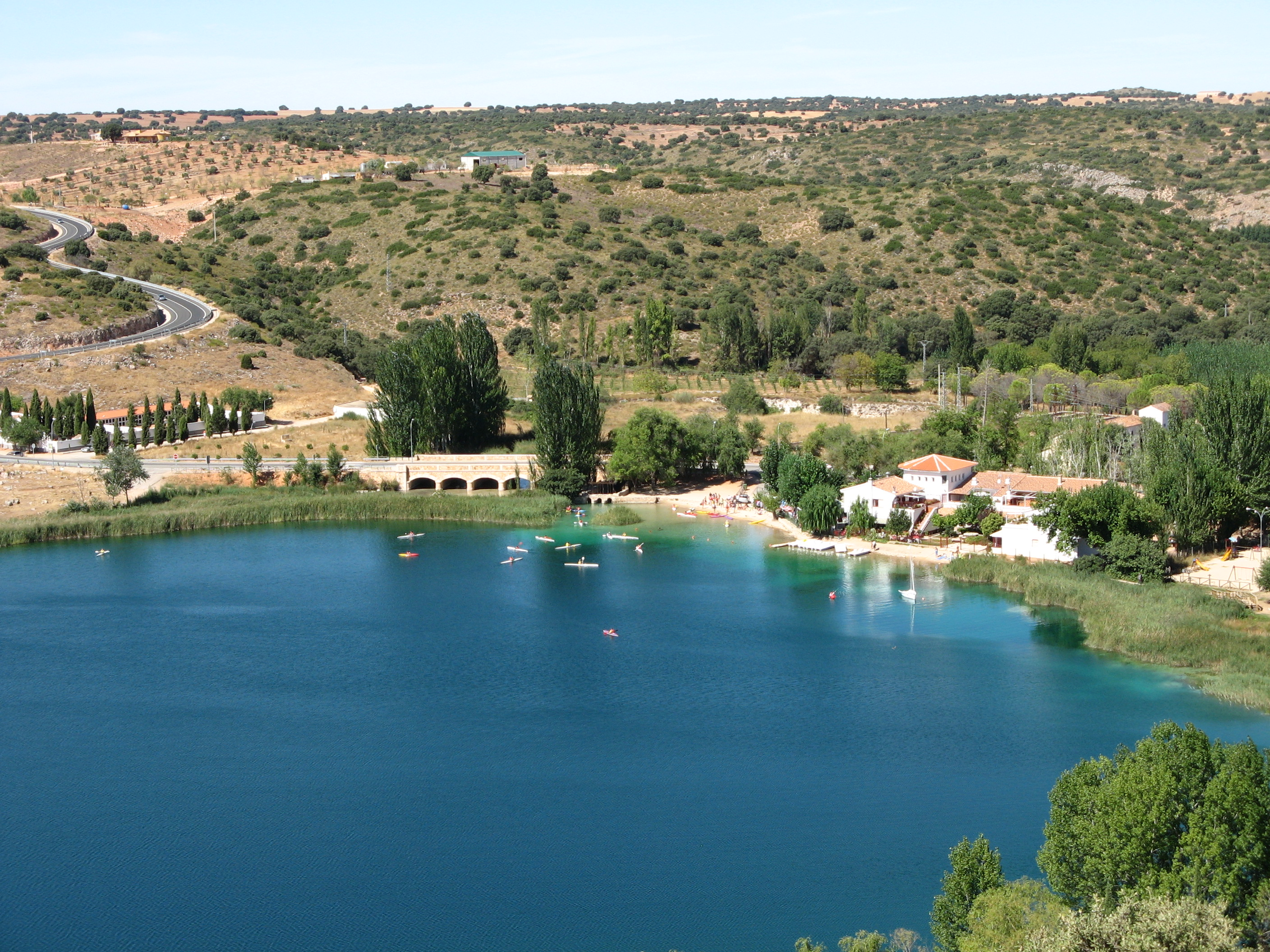
Lagunas de Ruidera

Flag of Ruidera

Coat of arms of Ruidera

Ruidera is a municipality located in the province of Ciudad Real, Castile-La Mancha, Spain. It has a population of 596.

It is located close to the Lagunas de Ruidera natural lakes.
