= Nero Redivivus =

Belief that Roman Emperor Nero would return after his death

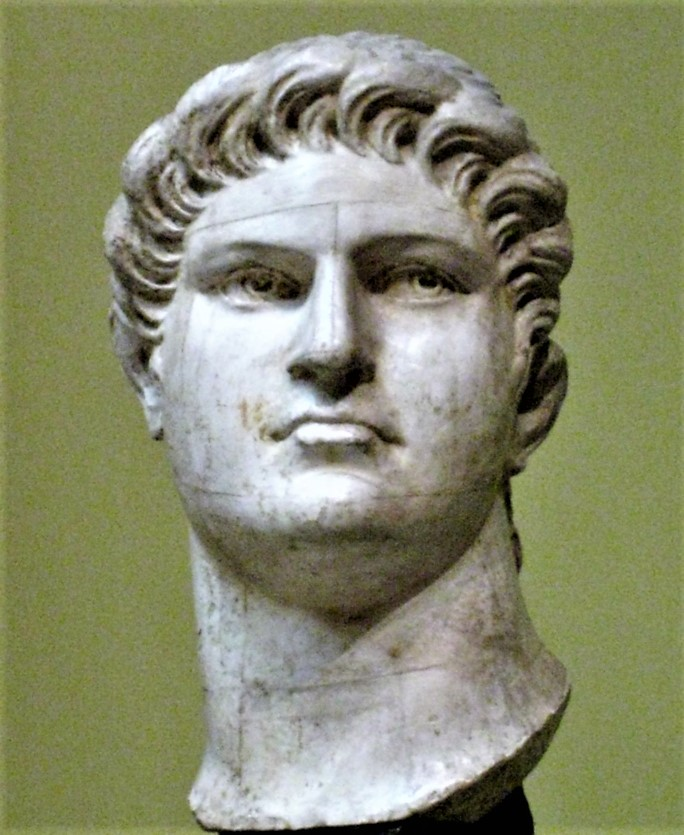
Nero was the fifth and final emperor of Rome's first imperial dynasty, the Julio-Claudians.

The Nero Redivivus legend was a belief popular during the last part of the 1st century that the Roman emperor Nero would return after his death in 68 AD. The legend was a common belief as late as the 5th century. The belief was either the result or cause of several imposters who posed as Nero leading rebellions.

Some of the 1st and early 2nd century population viewed the idea of a revived Nero or one that had somehow had a faked death positively, as an avenger against any perceived evils of the day. Many early Christians viewed the idea quite negatively, and tied Nero Redivivus to conceptions of the Antichrist.

== Background ==
Roman Emperor Nero committed suicide in June 68 AD. However, there appears to have been a belief among segments of the populace that his death had happened under unclear circumstances or was outright fabricated, especially in the Greek-speaking Eastern half of the Empire. The situation was likely not aided by Nero being buried at the Pincian Hill, a place different from the Mausoleum of Augustus, and without fanfare. Nero's eccentricities and clashes with the other Roman aristocracy led to his image staying in the popular imagination as both a potential savior and destroyer.

At least two impostors emerged leading rebellions, sometimes called Pseudo-Neros. The first emerged a year later in 69 AD during the reign of Vitellius. He is said to have sung and played the cithara or lyre, and that his face was similar to that of the dead emperor. (Note: Perseus Project Hist.2.8) During the reign of Emperor Titus (c. 79–81), Terentius Maximus appeared in the Roman province of Asia and is said by Cassius Dio to also have sung to the accompaniment of the lyre and looked like Nero. (Note: Dio, LXVI.19.3) Twenty years after Nero's death (c. 88, during the reign of Emperor Domitian), there was possibly a third pretender, although some historians speculate he may have been the same Pseudo-Nero as in 79 AD. He was supported by the Parthian Empire; the matter nearly came to war with the Romans, who demanded his extradition. (Note: Perseus Project Hist.1.2) (Note: Perseus Project Nero57)

== Early legends ==
Nero's death was followed by upheaval and chaos in the Year of the Four Emperors (69 AD). An artistic, freewheeling eccentric appears to have appealed to at least some as an island of stability to be nostalgic over. Additionally, Nero seems to have maintained a good reputation after his death among the Greeks, for whom he had "liberated" Achaea by allowing it marginally more local freedom; the Armenians, for whom he treated Tiridates well; and the Parthians. Nero's death was a surprise to many, and he was rather young at the time, 31 years old, so if he had somehow lived, suggesting he might still be a relevant force in the 70s and 80s AD was not unreasonable. As hopes of his return were kept alive by some, this also helped create the counter-belief that he would indeed return, but cast such a return in dark and apocalyptic terms, in particular early Christians.

Embittered after the destruction of the Second Temple in the First Jewish–Roman War, some first-century Jews appear to have placed hopes in Nero exacting vengeance upon Rome. The Sibylline Oracles are one early surviving reference to the idea of Nero Redivivus. While the surviving form of the Sibylline Oracles was likely edited by Christians, most believe that some of it originates from Greek-speaking Hellenistic Jews. One quote mentions "the exiled man of Rome, lifting a mighty sword, will cross the Euphrates [from Parthia] with many tens of thousands" – perhaps originally a reference to the second Nero pretender during Titus's reign, but one that would grow into a broader legend. Another quote mentions "a fugitive king" who flees to the Parthian Empire and who will conquer the city of Rome and cause the Roman nobles to "dye the ground with their blood," (Note: The Sibylline Oracles, IV, 155-159.178-180; V.137-141; V.361-396) presumably as punishment for destroying the Temple. Still, the Sibylline Oracles are not all positive, and show signs of the later hostile view of Nero Redivivus. The fifth book (written c. 70s–80s AD) says Nero "shall be malignant. Then he shall return, making himself equal to God: but God shall convince him that he is not." The fifth book also features another paragraph where Nero Redivivus will seek to destroy Jerusalem instead of Rome, although some scholars propose that this is a later Christian scribe's interpolation. The final reference in the Oracles suggests he will start a universal war that will ruin all the earth and destroy all kings and the best of men.

During the reign of the emperor Trajan (r. 98–117), Dio Chrysostom, a Greek philosopher and historian, wrote:

even now all long for him [Nero] to be alive; indeed, many think he is actually still alive.

— Dio Chrysostom, Orations 21, "On Beauty"

Suetonius wrote in 121 AD that astrologers forecast that if Nero was forced to leave Rome, he would find another throne in the Eastern part of the empire, and that one or two even directly suggested Jerusalem.

The tractate Gittin of the Talmud was written centuries later (3rd–6th century), but includes an echo of the idea that Nero did not really die in Rome (although it does not imply he was miraculously revived). It includes a story where Nero visits Jerusalem, "flees" (perhaps rather than dying?), converts to Judaism, and lives long enough afterward to become an ancestor of Rabbi Meir.

== In Christianity ==
The idea of Nero Redivivus circulated among early Christians as well, but generally with hostility and fear. Nero was identified as the first persecutor due to his blaming the Great Fire of Rome on Christians, so the prospect of Nero's return was associated with calamity and the forces of evil ruling the world. The most notable surviving early example is the Book of Revelation (written at some point in the 90s AD), also known as the Apocalypse of John, which was eventually included in the canon of the New Testament. Revelation 13 includes a figure called The Beast which is commonly thought to be at minimum affected by the imagery of Nero Redivivus, and more likely a direct reference to him. In particular, The Beast is said to be wounded but then healed (possibly a reference to Nero's death and alleged return), and Revelation 17 8-11 mentions an eighth king who is also one of the earlier seven kings, reminiscent of the earlier king being Nero and the eighth king being Nero Redivivus. This resulted in Nero Redivivus being seen as a possible identity of the Antichrist.

The Christian poet Commodian, writing around 240 in his poem "Instructions," tied Nero Redivivus to his interpretation of the Book of Revelation and the end times. He wrote that "Nero shall be raised up from hell" and the world divided among three powers. Another poem from him is more specific, saying that there would be two Antichrists of which Nero would be the first. Nero would conquer Rome and persecute Christians for three and a half years, but a new Jewish Antichrist will arrive afterward and conquer Nero.

Victorinus of Pettau wrote a commentary on Revelation around 260 that interprets The Beast as being Nero Redivivus, who he expected to attack from the East with the aid of an army of Jews. Lactantius, writing in the early 4th century, does not directly endorse the idea himself, but documents the persistence of the belief. Lactantius ties it to how people believed that, similar to how Enoch and Elijah were thought to be waiting to return to herald in the end times (perhaps as the two witnesses), Nero might be the devil's pick to return as a precursor before the devastation of the world and downfall of the human race.

In the 5th century, Sulpicius Severus mentions his belief in two of his writings (in 403 and 404) that Nero was The Beast referred to in Revelation 13 and would be released again in the End Times. Augustine of Hippo wrote in The City of God (c. 413-427) that some believed "he [Nero] now lives in concealment in the vigor of that same age which he had reached when he was believed to have perished, and will live until he is revealed in his own time and restored to his kingdom." (Note: Augustine of Hippo, City of God XX.19.3)

== See also ==
- Sebastianism
