= Terentius Maximus =

Terentius Maximus, also known as the Pseudo-Nero, was a Roman who rebelled during the reign of Titus, but was suppressed. He resembled Nero in appearance and in action, as he was known to perform singing with the accompaniment of the lyre.

He gained his followers first in Asia, and then gained many more during his march to the Euphrates. He later fled to Parthia and tried to gain support there by claiming (supposedly in the person of Nero) that the people there owed him some requital for the return of Armenia. Artabanus III, a Parthian leader, out of anger towards Titus, both received him and made preparations to reinstate him to Rome. He was executed when his true identity was revealed.

== In literature ==
In 1936, Lion Feuchtwanger wrote The Pretender (Der falsche Nero), a fictional novel in which he compared Terentius Maximus with Adolf Hitler.
