= Lagunas de Ruidera =

Group of small lakes in Spain

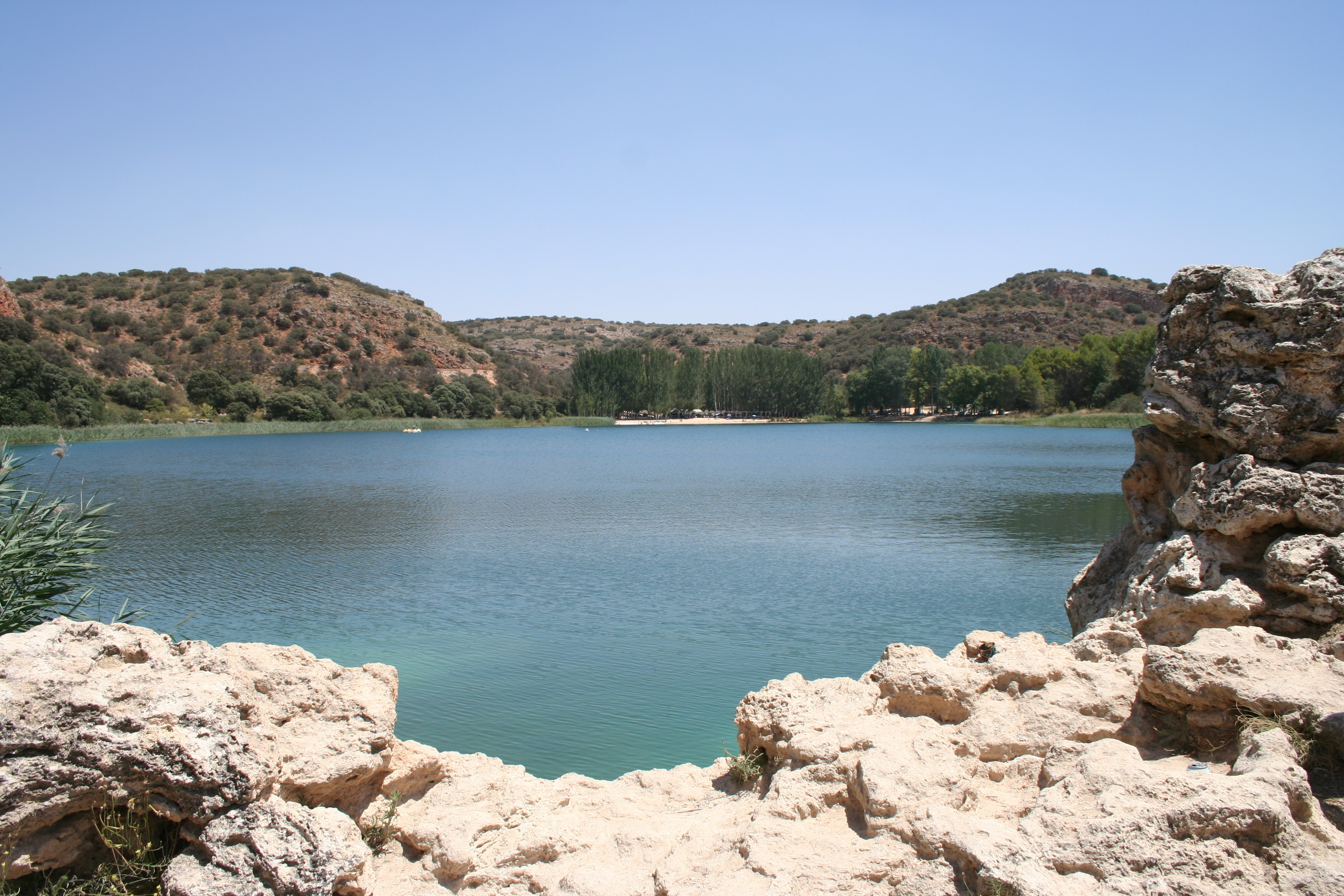
- Interactive map of Lagunas de Ruidera
- Location: Campo de Montiel, Castilla-La Mancha, Spain
- Coordinates: 39°15′N 2°52′W
- Type: Group of small lakes
- Basin countries: Spain
- Water volume: 23.06 hm³ (6,222.51 ac-ft)
- Settlements: Ruidera, Ossa de Montiel, Villahermosa
Designations
Ramsar Wetland
- Official name: Lagunas de Ruidera
- Designated: 23 September 2011
- Reference no.: 2069

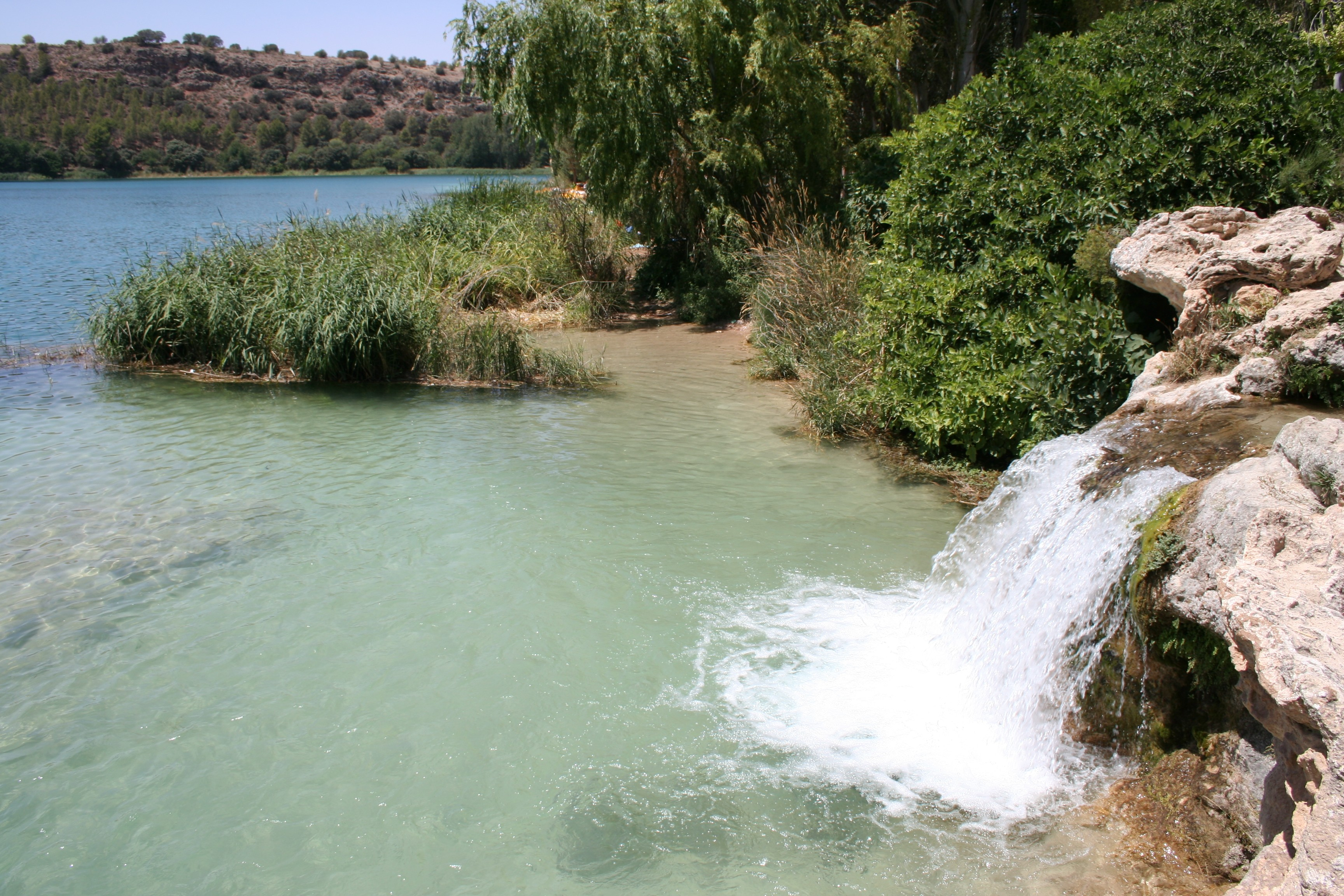
Small waterfall in Laguna de Santos Morcillo

The Lagunas de Ruidera are a group of small lakes in the Campo de Montiel, Castilla-La Mancha, between Albacete Province, and Ciudad Real Province, Spain. Most of the lakes are interconnected and their total water amount may reach 23.06 hm^{3}, which is considerable by the standards of other lakes in the Iberian Peninsula.

The largest lakes are Laguna Colgada and Laguna del Rey. The area near the lakes is a tourist site, with small hotels, restaurants, camping sites and private villas, located mostly in or around Ruidera town. The area can be reached from Ossa de Montiel or Villahermosa.

== List of lakes ==
There are now 15 small lakes in the group:

=== Albacete Province ===
- Laguna Colgada
- Laguna Batana
- Laguna Santos Morcillo
- Laguna Salvadora
- Laguna Lengua
- Laguna Redondilla
- Laguna de San Pedro
- Laguna Tinaja
- Laguna Tomilla
- Laguna Conceja
- Laguna Taza. This lake was drained in order to build a camping site

=== Ciudad Real Province ===
- Laguna Cenagosa
- Laguna Coladilla
- Laguna Cueva Morenilla
- Laguna del Rey
- Laguna Blanca

== Ecology ==
There are a variety of birds in the lake shores: ducks, like the red-crested pochard, common pochard, mallard and tufted duck, as well as the Eurasian coot, common moorhen, great reed warbler, bearded reedling, purple heron, little bittern and egrets. In the waters of the lakes there are also endemic Iberian fishes like the Rutilus lemmingii, Luciobarbus guiraonis, Iberian barbel, Luciobarbus microcephalus, Squalius pyrenaicus, as well as introduced species, like the common carp, northern pike, largemouth bass and Gambusia holbrooki. The Procambarus clarkii is an introduced species of crayfish that has caused great damage to the local aquatic fauna. Among the amphibians, the European tree frog, Mediterranean tree frog and the southern marbled newt are present along the shores of the lakes.

The protected area of the Lagunas de Ruidera Natural Park includes not only the lakes but also the tributary valley of San Pedro. UNESCO has included the natural park within the biosphere reserve Mancha Húmeda.

The natural park acts as a buffer zone to the core area of the biosphere reserve, the Tablas de Daimiel wetlands.

== Legend ==
In the second part of Don Quixote, the enchanted knight Montesinos explains to Don Quixote in a dream that duenna Ruidera, her seven daughters and two nieces were enchanted by Merlin and kept in the Cave of Montesinos, Ossa de Montiel, with the dead knight Durandarte. So much they wept that Merlin changed them into the lakes. Durandarte's squire Guadiana was changed into the river so named.

== See also ==
- Lagunas de Ruidera Natural Park
- Mancha Húmeda
