= Agrippa Postumus =

Grandson of Augustus (12 BC – AD 14)

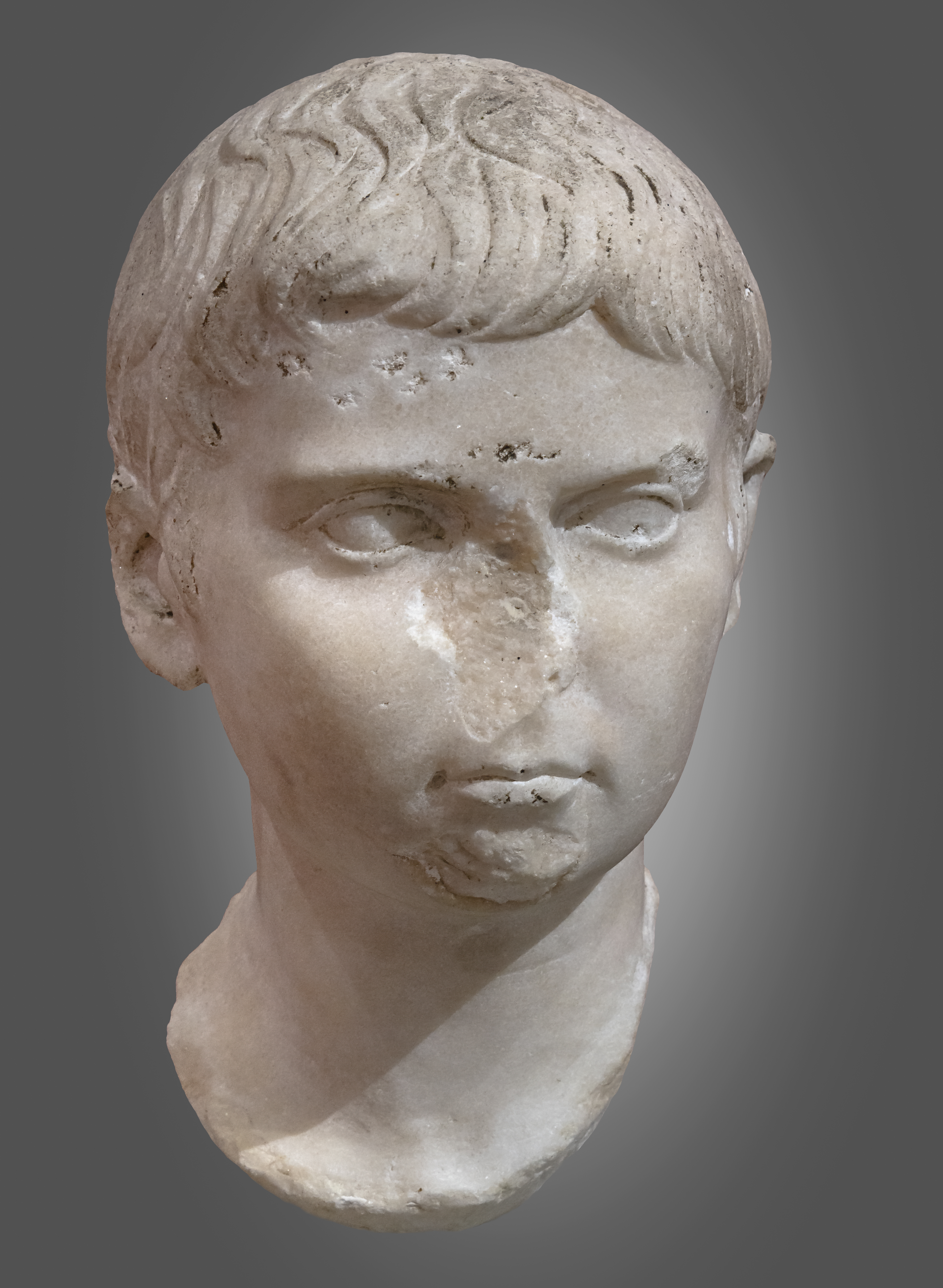
- Portrait of Marcus Agrippa Postumus (Musée Saint-Raymond)
- Born: 12 BC; Rome, Italy
- Died: August AD 14 (aged 24/25); Planasia, Italy
Names
- Marcus Agrippa Postumus (birth); Agrippa Julius Caesar (after adoption)
- Dynasty: Julio-Claudian
- Father: Marcus Vipsanius Agrippa; Augustus (adoptive)
- Mother: Julia the Elder

Marcus Agrippa Postumus (12 BC – August 14 AD), (Note: Mudd 2012, p. 115: "The elder Agrippa died, in the summer of 12 BC, while Julia was pregnant with their fifth child. The boy was very likely born sometime after June 26 of the following year. When his grandfather adopted him, on the same date in AD 4, the youth had not yet assumed the toga virilis; therefore, he was probably less than 15 years of age".) later named Agrippa Julius Caesar, was a grandson of Roman Emperor Augustus. He was the youngest child of Marcus Vipsanius Agrippa and Julia the Elder. Augustus initially considered Postumus as a potential successor and formally adopted him as his heir, before banishing Postumus from Rome in AD 6 on account of his ferocia ("beastly nature"). In effect, though not in law, the action cancelled his adoption and virtually assured Tiberius' emplacement as Augustus' sole heir. Postumus was ultimately executed by his own guards shortly after Augustus' death in AD 14.

Postumus was a member of the Julio-Claudian dynasty, the first imperial family of the Roman Empire. His maternal grandparents were Augustus and his second wife, Scribonia. Postumus was also a maternal uncle of Emperor Caligula, who was the son of Postumus' sister Agrippina the Elder, as well as a great-uncle of Nero, the last Julio-Claudian emperor, whose mother, Agrippina the Younger, was Caligula's sister.

== Name ==
Postumus was initially named "Marcus Agrippa" in honour of his father, who died shortly before his birth and so, following the Roman custom, the surname Postumus, meaning "last", was added. After the death of his older brothers, Lucius and Gaius Caesar, Postumus was adopted by his maternal grandfather, Augustus. A lex curiata ratified his adoption from which Postumus assumed the filiation Augusti f., meaning "son of Augustus". Postumus was then legally the son of Augustus, as well as his biological grandson. As a consequence, Postumus was adopted into the Julia gens and took the name "Agrippa Julius Caesar".

== Early life and family ==
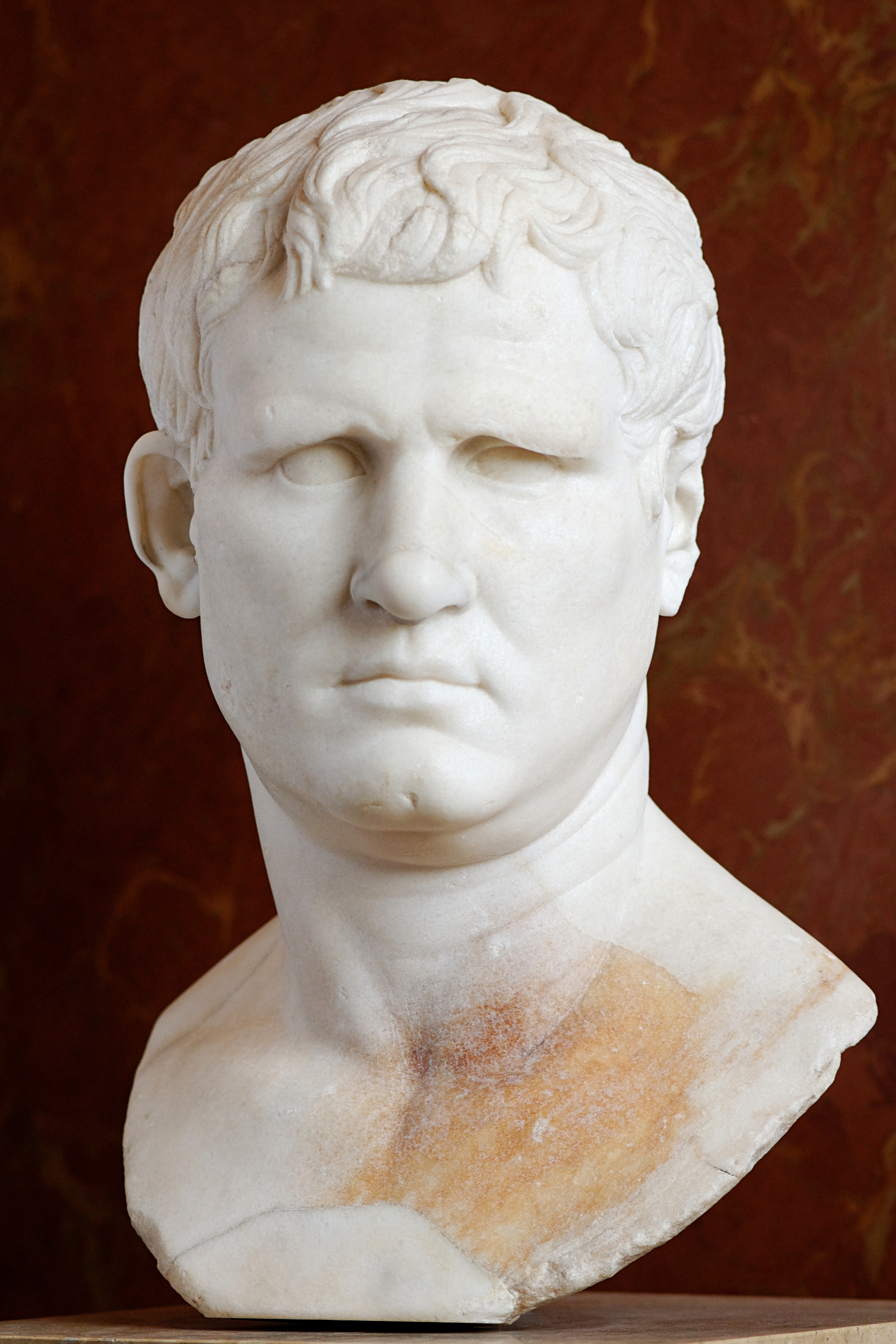
A bust of Postumus's father, Marcus Vipsanius Agrippa

Agrippa Postumus was born in Rome in 12 BC, approximately three months after his father, Marcus Vipsanius Agrippa, had died in the summer. (Note: Dio 54, 28: "[When Agrippa died] Augustus happened to be giving, under the name of his children, contests of armed warriors at the Panathenaic festival, and when he learned of Agrippa's condition he left the country. Finding him dead, he conveyed the body to the capital and allowed it to lie in state in the Forum".) He was born into the equestrian gens Vipsania. His father was one of Augustus' leading generals and his mother, Julia the Elder, was the daughter of Augustus and his second wife, Scribonia. Postumus was the third son and last child of Agrippa and Julia; his older siblings were Gaius Caesar, Julia the Younger, Lucius Caesar and Agrippina the Elder. Both of his brothers, Gaius and Lucius, were adopted by Augustus after the birth of Lucius in 17 BC.

Before Gaius left Rome for Asia, Gaius and Lucius had been given the authority to consecrate the Temple of Mars Ultor (1 August 2 BC), and they managed the games that were held to celebrate the dedication of the Temple. Postumus, still a student, participated in the Lusus Troiae ("Trojan Games") with the rest of the equestrian youth. At these games, according to Cassius Dio, 260 lions were slaughtered in the Circus Maximus, there was gladiatorial combat and a naval battle between the "Persians" and the "Athenians" and 36 crocodiles were slaughtered in the Circus Flaminius.

=== Adoption ===
At first Augustus opted not to adopt Postumus so that Agrippa would have at least one son to carry on his family name. However the untimely deaths of principes Lucius (d. AD 2) and Gaius (d. AD 4) forced Augustus to adopt Postumus, his only remaining biological grandson, and Tiberius, Augustus' eldest stepson from his third wife, Livia, on 26 June AD 4 to secure the succession. He agreed to adopt Tiberius if Tiberius first adopted Germanicus. Upon his adoption into the Julii Caesares, Postumus assumed the name Marcus Julius Caesar Agrippa Postumus. After the adoptions of AD 4, in the event of Augustus' death the title of princeps would pass first to Tiberius and then to Germanicus.

It was not intended that Postumus receive the emperorship; instead he was meant to be the heir to Augustus' bloodline. He would receive Augustus' name, property and bloodline but not the title of princeps. Indeed, Postumus was not given any special schooling or treatment after his adoption. In AD 5, at the age of 17, he received the toga virilis and his name was added to the list of aristocratic youth eligible for training as military officers. That differed greatly from the honours received by his brothers, both of whom were inducted into the Roman Forum by Augustus himself to commemorate their adoptions, given the title Princeps Iuventutis ("Leader of the Youth") and promised the consulship five years in advance, to be held when they reached 19.

== Exile ==
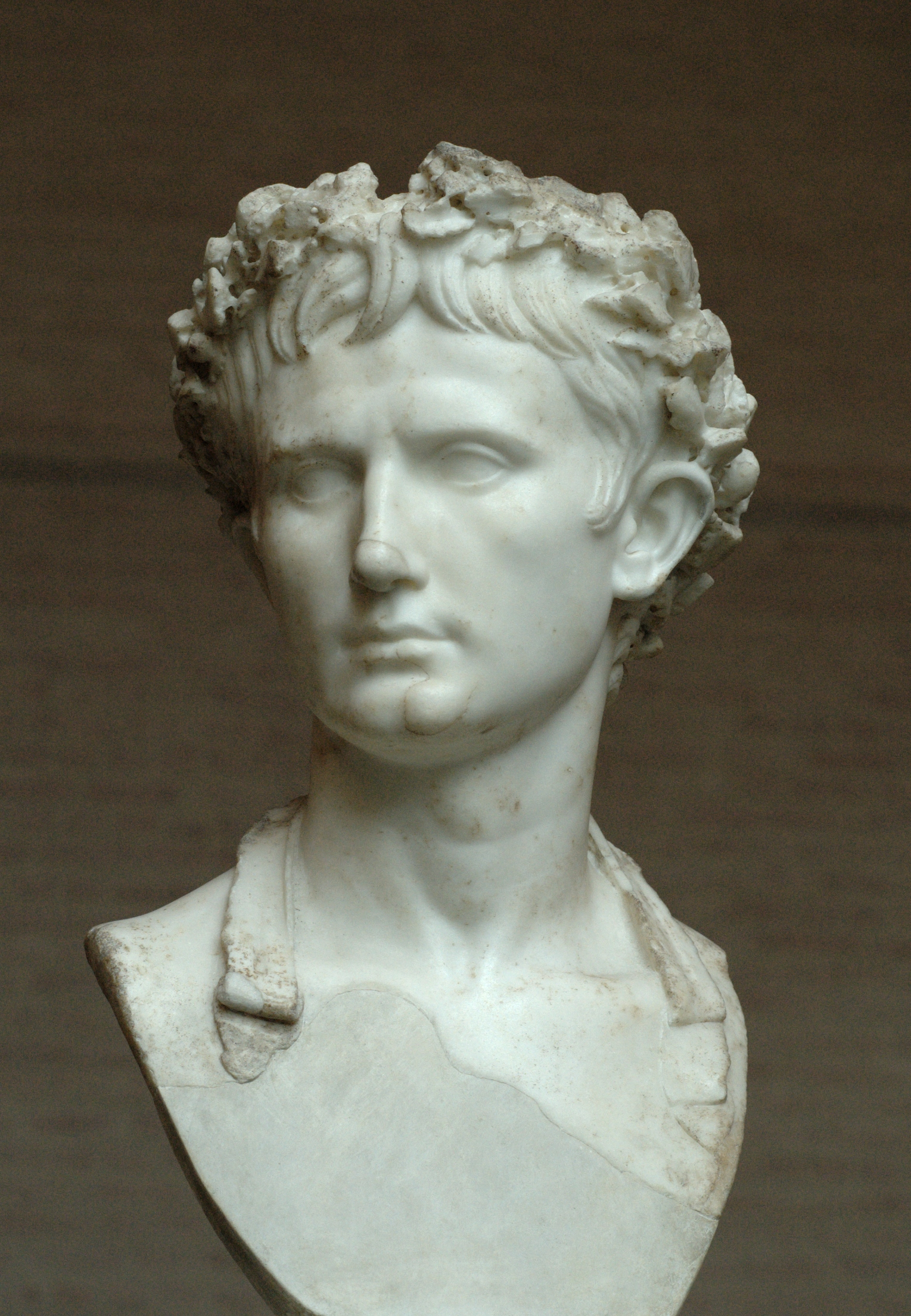
Augustus Bevilacqua, a bust of Emperor Augustus wearing the civic crown

In AD 6, an uprising began in the Roman province of Illyricum. Augustus sent Tiberius to crush the revolt with his army, and after a year of delayed results, he sent Germanicus in his capacity as quaestor to assist in bringing the war to a swift end. The reason, Dio says, that Germanicus was chosen over Postumus is because Postumus was of an "illiberal nature".

Postumus was known for being brutish, insolent, stubborn and potentially violent. He possessed great physical strength and reportedly showed little interest in anything other than fishing. He resisted all efforts to improve his behavior, which forced Augustus to "abdicate" him from the Julii in AD 6 and banish him to a villa at Surrentum, near Pompeii. As an abdicated adoptee (adoptatus abdicatus), he lost the Julian name and returned to the gens Vipsania. The ancient historian Velleius Paterculus had this to say of the banishment:

Hoc fere tempore Agrippa... mira pravitate animi atque ingenii in praecipitia conversus patris atque eiusdem avi sui animum alienavit sibi, moxque crescentibus in dies vitiis dignum furore suo habuit exitum.

— Velleius Paterculus 2.112.7
Translation:

About this time Agrippa... alienated from himself the affection of his father who was also his grandfather, falling into reckless ways by an amazing depravity of attitude and intellect; and soon, as his vices increased daily, he met the end which his madness deserved.

— Pettinger 2012, p. 103

The following year, in 7 AD, Augustus had the Senate make Postumus' banishment permanent and had him moved to Planasia (now Pianosa, Italy), a small island between Italy and Corsica. Augustus bolstered the natural inaccessibility of the rocky island by having an armed guard installed there. The Senate was ordered never to allow his release.

No consensus has emerged as to why Augustus banished Postumus. Tacitus suggests that Augustus' wife, Livia, had always disliked and shunned Postumus, as he stood in the way of her son, Tiberius, succeeding to power after Augustus since Postumus was a direct biological descendant of Augustus, unlike Tiberius. Some modern historians theorise that Postumus may have become involved in a conspiracy against Augustus. Postumus was held under intense security.

Postumus' sister Julia was banished around the same time (AD 8), and her husband, Lucius Aemilius Paullus, was executed for allegedly plotting a conspiracy against Augustus. There was later a conspiracy to rescue Julia and Postumus by Lucius Audasius and Asinius Epicadus. Audasius was an accused forger of advanced age and Asinius was half-Illyrian. According to Suetonius, Audasius and Epicadus had planned to take Julia and Postumus by force to the armies. It is unclear what their exact plan was or even to which armies Suetonius was referring because the conspiracy was discovered early in its planning, possibly before they had even left Rome.

=== Events of AD 14 ===
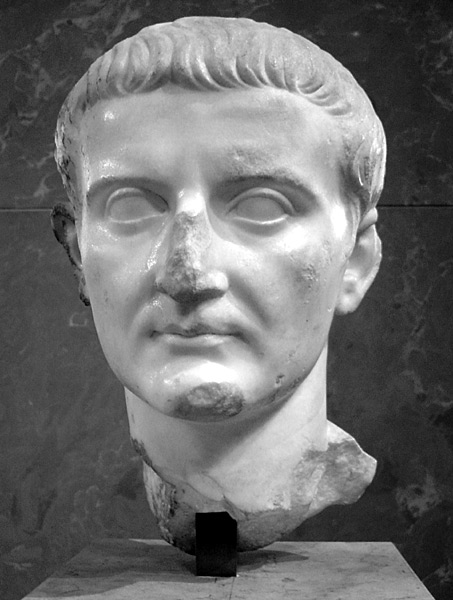
A bust of Tiberius conserved in Paris at the Louvre

Augustus made no effort to contact Postumus until AD 14. In the summer of that year Augustus left Rome, never to see the capital again. The main ancient sources of information about the period, Tacitus and Cassius Dio, suggest that Augustus left Rome in the company of only one trusted friend, the senator Paullus Fabius Maximus. They left for Planasia to pay Augustus' banished grandson a highly controversial visit.

Fabius and then Augustus died on their return without revealing what they had been doing. Tacitus reports their visit to Planasia as a rumour although Dio reports it as fact. According to the historian Robin Lane Fox, the alleged visit has sometimes been dismissed by modern scholars. However it has been shown that Augustus and Fabius were absent from Rome in mid-May of AD 14. Augustus' adopted grandson, Drusus the Younger, was then being admitted into the Arval Brethren, and an inscription (ILS, 5026) shows that both Augustus and Fabius voted in absentia to admit him into the priesthood.

There was much gossip over the outcome of their expedition. Tacitus recounts the rumour that Augustus had decided to reverse his decision and make Postumus his successor. In his account Fabius indiscreetly told his wife what had occurred during the trip, and that cost him his life. Augustus' wife, Livia, too was said to have poisoned her husband to prevent Postumus from becoming the successor and thus supplanting her son, Tiberius. While modern historians, including Fox, agree that such stories are highly unlikely, there is evidence that Augustus' journey was historical. "It is the last act in Augustus' long marathon of finding and keeping an heir to the new Empire."

=== Deaths of Augustus and Postumus ===
Augustus died on 19 August AD 14. Despite being banished, Postumus had not legally been disinherited and so could claim a share in Augustus' inheritance. According to Augustus' will, sealed on 3 April AD 13, Tiberius would inherit two thirds of his estate and Livia one third. There is no mention of Postumus in the document. Tiberius gave the eulogy at Augustus' funeral and made a show of reluctantly accepting the title of princeps.

At almost the same time as Augustus' death, Postumus was killed by the centurion Gaius Sallustius Crispus, the great-nephew and adopted son of the historian Sallust. When Crispus reported to Tiberius that "his orders have been carried out", Tiberius threatened to bring the matter before the Senate and professed that he had given no such orders. Tiberius denied any involvement, argued that he had been en route to Illyricum when he was recalled to Rome, and later issued a statement that it was Augustus who had given the order that Agrippa Postumus not survive him. It is not clear if the killing was carried out before or after Tiberius became emperor.

== Legacy ==
Two years later, there was an attempt by Postumus' former slave Clemens to impersonate him. Clemens was able to impersonate Postumus because people did not remember what Postumus looked like, but Dio also says there was a resemblance between them. The impersonation was carried out by the same slave who had set out in AD 14 to ship Postumus away, and the act was met with considerable success among the plebs.

According to the historian Erich S. Gruen, various contemporary sources state that Postumus was a "vulgar young man, brutal and brutish, and of depraved character". The Roman historian Tacitus defended him, but his praise was slight: "[He was] the young, physically tough, indeed brutish, Agrippa Postumus. Though devoid of every good quality, he had been involved in no scandal." It was common for ancient historians to portray Postumus as dim-witted and brutish. Velleius portrays Postumus as having had a deformed or perverse character, Dio records a propensity to violence ("He had an impetuous temper...") and a devotion to "servile pursuits", and both Tacitus and Suetonius describe him as fierce ("ferox"). Contemporaries were reported to have described Postumus as wild ("trux"), and Suetonius is in agreement with Dio's "servile pursuits" depiction. The historian Andrew Pettinger argues that the descriptions of Postumus reveal a moral inadequacy, not a mental disorder.

=== In fiction ===
Postumus is depicted in many works of art due to his relationship with the leading family of the early Roman Empire. They include:

- I, Claudius (1934), a novel by Robert Graves, presents Postumus in a positive light, as a boyhood friend of the narrator, Claudius. It creates a fictional incident in which Postumus is framed by Livia and her granddaughter Livilla for the attempted rape of Livilla, as a means of all but guaranteeing Tiberius' succession to the emperorship. Postumus is banished to Planasia but escapes execution when Augustus arranges for his impersonation by his freed slave Clemens, who is later executed by Crispus, unwittingly in Postumus' stead. The real Postumus spends time on the run, but is eventually captured and executed by Tiberius.
- In The Caesars (1968), a television series by Philip Mackie, Postumus was played by Derek Newark. Here Postumus is sentenced to death by Augustus, who decides to permanently remove his only remaining grandson as an obstacle to the succession of Tiberius.
- In I, Claudius (1976), a television series by Jack Pulman based on Graves' novels, Postumus was played by John Castle. This retains the story from the novel of Postumus being framed for the assault on Livilla, and the later visit to Planasia by Augustus, but removes his fictional survival and shifts the events concerning his banishment to after the Battle of the Teutoburg Forest. He is killed by Sejanus on Planasia after Augustus' death.

== Ancestry ==
Ancestry of Agrippa Postumus

4. Lucius Vipsanius Agrippa
2. Marcus Vipsanius Agrippa
1. Agrippa Postumus
12. Gaius Octavius
6. Augustus
13. Atia
3. Julia the Elder
14. Lucius Scribonius Libo
7. Scribonia
15. Sentia

== Sources ==
=== Primary sources ===
- Cassius Dio, Roman History Books 55–57, English translation
- Suetonius, Lives of the Twelve Caesars, Life of Augustus, Latin text with English translation
- Tacitus, Annals I, English translation

=== Secondary sources ===
- Alston, Richard (1998), Aspects of Roman History AD 14–117, Routledge, ISBN 0-203-20095-0
- Dumont, Hervé (2009), L'Antiquité au cinéma: Vérités, légendes et manipulations (in French), Nouveau monde éditions, ISBN 978-2847364767
- Gibson, A. G. G. (2015), Robert Graves and the Classical Tradition, Oxford University Press, ISBN 978-0191057977
- Koortbojian, Michael (2013), The Divinization of Caesar and Augustus, Cambridge University Press, ISBN 978-0521192156
- Levick, Barbara (1976), Tiberius the Politician, Routledge, ISBN 0-203-16513-6
- Levick, Barbara (2012), Claudius, Routledge, ISBN 978-1135107710
- Fox, Robin Lane (2006), The Classical World: An Epic History From Homer to Hadrian, Basic Books, ISBN 978-0465024964
- Mudd, Mary (2012), I, Livia: The Counterfeit Criminal. the Story of a Much Maligned Woman, Trafford Publishing, ISBN 978-1-4120-4606-0
- Norwood, Frances (1963), "The Riddle of Ovid's Relegatio", Classical Philology, vol. 58
- Pettinger, Andrew (2012), The Republic in Danger: Drusus Libo and the Succession of Tiberius, Oxford University Press, ISBN 978-0199601745
- Powell, Lindsay (2015), Marcus Agrippa: Right-hand Man of Caesar Augustus, Pen & Sword Military, ISBN 978-1848846173
- Swan, Michael Peter (2004), The Augustan Succession: An Historical Commentary on Cassius Dio's Roman History, Oxford University Press, ISBN 0-19-516774-0
- Syme, Ronald (1958). "Imperator Caesar: A Study in Nomenclature". Historia. 7 (2): 172–188. JSTOR 4434568.
- Terrace, Vincent (1981), Television: 1970–1980, A.S. Barnes, ISBN 978-0498025396
- Vagi, David L. (1999), Coinage and History of the Roman Empire, c. 82 B.C. – A.D. 480: History, Fitzroy Dearborn Publishing, ISBN 1-57958-316-4
- This article incorporates text from a publication now in the public domain: Smith, William, ed. (1873). "Agrippa Postumus". Dictionary of Greek and Roman Biography and Mythology. Vol. 1. p. 78.

a
