= Ossa de Montiel =

- Municipality
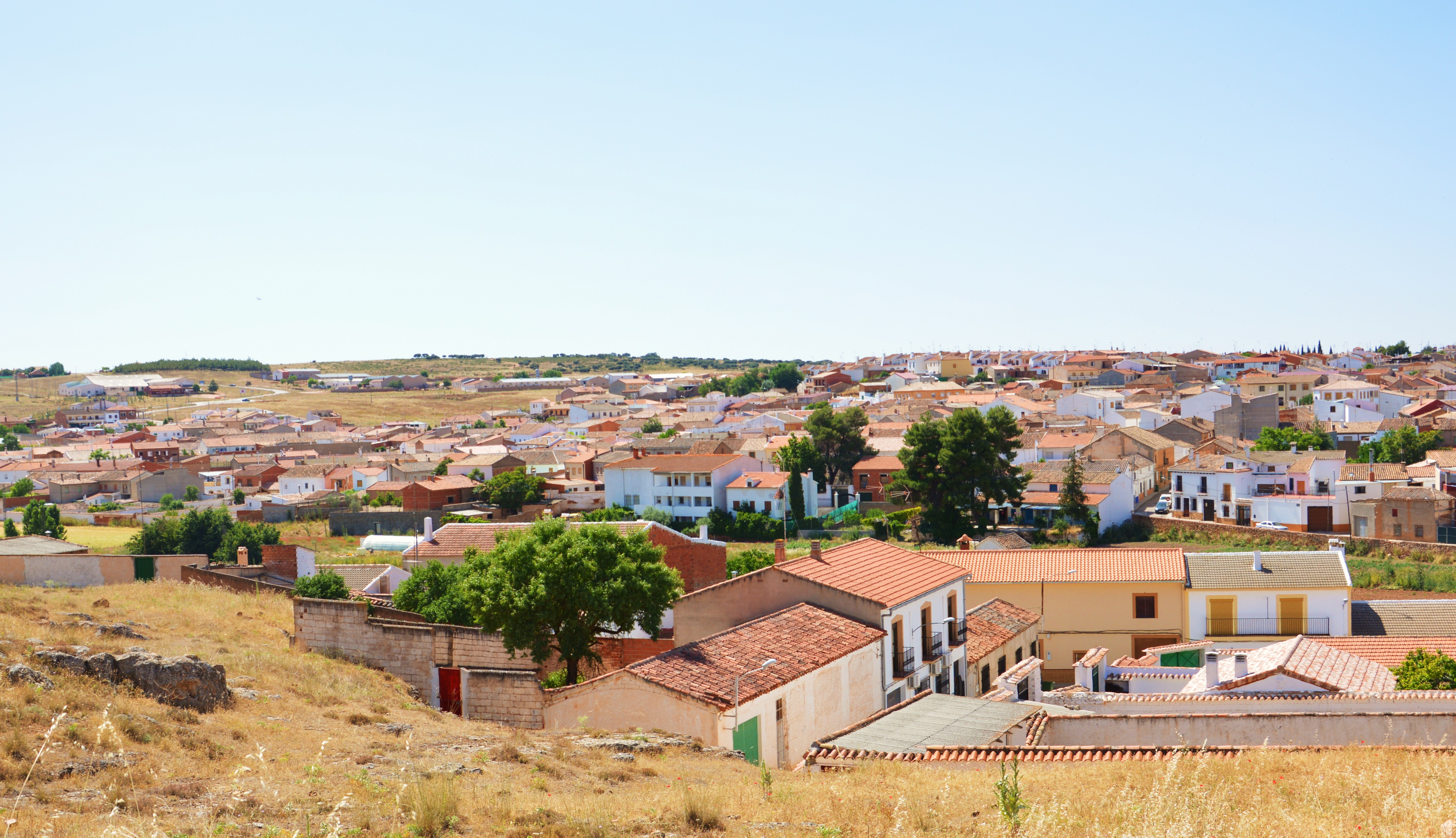
- General view of Ossa de Montiel.

- Location of Ossa de Montiel. Ossa de Montiel (Castilla-La Mancha)
- Coordinates: 38°58′N 2°45′W
- Country: Spain
- Community: Castilla-La Mancha
- Province: Albacete
- Comarca: Campo de Montiel

Government
  - Mayor: Alejandro Chillerón Mora (Somos el Cambio)

Area
  - Total: 243.71 km^{2} (94.10 sq mi)

Population (2023)
  - Total: 2,209
  - Density: 9.064/km^{2} (23.48/sq mi)
- Time zone: UTC+1 (CET)
  - Summer (DST): UTC+2 (CEST)
- Postal code: 02611
- Website: www.ossademontiel.es

Ossa de Montiel is a municipality in Albacete, Castile-La Mancha, Spain. It has a population of 2,209 (2023).

The Lagunas de Ruidera are located within this town's municipal term.

== Notable people ==
- Óscar Sevilla, Spanish cyclist
