= Pseudo-Marius =

Roman politician (d. 44 BC)

- Born: Amatius (possibly); Herophilus (possibly); Chamates (possibly)
- Died: 13 April 44 BC; Rome
- Other name: Gaius Marius
- Era: Triumviral period
- Known for: claiming to be the grandson of Gaius Marius
- Parents: Gaius Marius the Younger (claimed) (father); Licinia Tertia (claimed) (mother)

Pseudo-Marius (also referred to as Amatius, Herophilus, Chamates, or the false Marius; died 13 April 44 BC) was a man who claimed to be the son of Gaius Marius the Younger, and therefore the grandson of the famous Roman general Gaius Marius. He was murdered on the orders of Mark Antony following the assassination of Julius Caesar.

== Biography ==
Pseudo-Marius, calling himself Gaius Marius, first appeared in Rome in 45 BC, where he presented himself as the patron of the towns founded by Marius's grandfather and populated by the descendants of the legionary veterans who were established there. Taking advantage of the Roman Dictator Julius Caesar's absence in Spain, he cultivated the support of the various plebeian collegia, and became enormously popular in the process. He was apparently wealthy enough to open up his gardens in order to entertain the people of Rome. Around the time Caesar returned to Rome in May 45 BC, Pseudo-Marius contacted the former Roman consul Cicero, asking for his help as a defender, presumably concerning a legal case. Cicero, writing to Titus Pomponius Atticus on 20 May 45 BC, says he refused, citing Marius' close familial links with Julius Caesar as the reason (Marius' supposed grandmother Julia was an aunt of Julius Caesar). It is uncertain whether the two events were linked, but in the autumn of 45 BC, Caesar expelled Pseudo-Marius from the city.

With Julius Caesar's assassination on 15 March 44 BC, Pseudo-Marius returned from exile and attempted to set himself up as leader of the city's plebeian masses. Assuming the role of Caesar's avenger, in early April 44 BC he erected an altar to Caesar on the spot where the dictator's body had been burnt. Once again his popularity skyrocketed, causing the consul Mark Antony some concern, as he was expecting the plebs of Rome to rally around him. Hearing news that self-proclaimed Marius had gathered together a street gang and was planning to capture and kill two of Caesar's assassins (Gaius Cassius Longinus and Marcus Junius Brutus), Mark Antony ordered his capture and put him to death without a trial on April 13. Although an illegal act, the Senate approved of it, as they were concerned about Cassius and Brutus' safety. Pseudo-Marius' body was dragged around the city and eventually thrown into the Tiber river. His followers gathered at the Roman Forum and demanded that the altar he had erected be dedicated to Marius, but Antony sent in soldiers to disperse the mob and kill the principal ringleaders.

== Identity of Pseudo-Marius ==
It remains unclear who this Pseudo-Marius was. According to Valerius Maximus, he was a former eye doctor called Herophilus, while Livy said he was a low born individual named Chamates. Finally, Appian called him Amatius or simply Pseudo-Marius. Modern scholarly opinion has largely followed the imperial historians' opinion, and declared that Pseudo-Marius was not the grandson of Gaius Marius, with suggestions including a runaway slave, or a freedman, or an illegitimate son of Gaius Marius the Younger. However, the only extant eyewitness, Cicero, has provided two very different accounts a year apart. In the first account, in the letter to Atticus in 45 BC, he casts no doubt on the identity of the so-called Marius - he explicitly names him as Gaius Marius, son of Gaius and grandson of Gaius. Then, in April 44 BC, when he hears of Pseudo-Marius' activities in Rome, he still refers to him as Marius, and on hearing of his death on April 13, explicitly names him the grandson of Lucius Licinius Crassus - the father-in-law of Gaius Marius the Younger.

However, by September 44 BC, Cicero's opinion had changed. In the 1st Philippic, delivered on 2 September 44 BC, Cicero declares that Marius was an impostor, an (unnamed) runaway slave who had assumed the name of Gaius Marius and had contemplated a massacre of the Senate. It is this assertion of being an impostor that the later Roman historians followed when providing the identity of Pseudo-Marius. However, the political environment in Rome when Cicero delivered his 1st Philippic may have required Cicero to possibly manufacture an alternate identity for Marius, given the longstanding political and friendship ties between the Marii and the Tullii Cicerones, and Cicero's desire not to be tainted by Pseudo-Marius' subversive activities in April.

The families of the Nobiles were a small elite aristocratic group in ancient Rome, and well known to each other. It is unlikely that Cicero would have been taken in by an impostor in 45 BC, especially as the two families came from the same town of Arpinum. Further, when Julius Caesar was confronted by Pseudo-Marius, he was silent on the matter of Pseudo-Marius' identity, and rather than having the impostor killed, he had Pseudo-Marius banished from Rome. Caesar would have known from his aunt (Julia, the wife of the famous Gaius Marius, and who died in 68 BC) whether she had a grandson or not, and his hesitancy in getting rid of Pseudo-Marius permanently, as well as his not denouncing the supposed impostor, speaks volumes. This theory is supported by a passage in Nicolaus of Damascus', Life of Augustus, where he relates that Pseudo-Marius approached the young Gaius Octavius who was accompanied by a number of women from his family. While some of the women acknowledged his paternity as the grandson of Gaius Marius, both Atia (Augustus' mother and Julius Caesar's niece) and her younger sister refused to confirm or deny his paternity.

Finally, the fact that the veterans in the Italic towns founded by Gaius Marius all acknowledged Pseudo-Marius as their patron. If he was not a member of the Marii, both the elite families of Rome and the clients of the Marii, both in Rome and across the towns in Italy, would never have acknowledged an impostor as their equal or their patron. Nevertheless the majority scholarly consensus, based upon the primary sources, remains that Pseudo-Marius was not the grandson of Gaius Marius. Some see his execution by Mark Antony without trial as evidence of his non-citizen status, that he was quite likely a wealthy freedman, and that his influence was achieved solely through the use of Marius' name.

== See also ==
- Clemens (impostor)

== Sources ==
=== Ancient ===
- Cicero, Letters to Atticus xii. 49, xiv. 6—8
- Cicero, Philippicae i. 2
- Valerius Maximus, ix. 15. § 2
- Appian, Civil Wars iii. 2, 3
- Livy, Epit. 116
- Nicolaus of Damascus, Life of Augustus c. 14. p. 258, ed. Coraes

=== Modern ===
- Meijer, F. J. (1986). "Marius' Grandson". Mnemosyne. 39 (1/2): 112–121. doi:10.1163/156852586X00077. JSTOR 4431470.
- Seidl Steed, Kathryn L., Memory and Leadership in the Late Roman Republic (2008), University of Michigan, pages 121–123
- Sumi, Geoffrey S., Ceremony and Power: Performing Politics in Rome Between Republic and Empire (2005), University of Michigan, pages 112–115
