= Water banking =

Water banking is the practice of forgoing water deliveries during certain periods, and “banking” either the right to use the forgone water in the future, or saving it for someone else to use in exchange for a fee or delivery in kind. It is usually used where there is significant storage capacity to facilitate such transfers of water.

== Spain ==
In Spain water banking was given a legislative basis by the 1999 Water Law. The socialist government elected in 2004 planned to create a public water bank in each hydrographical basin as part of its AGUA programme. This would allow historical water resources to be re-allocated according to "criteria of equity, efficiency, and sustainability".

== United States ==
In the United States, water banking is typically regulated and managed at the state level.
