= Cueva de Montesinos =

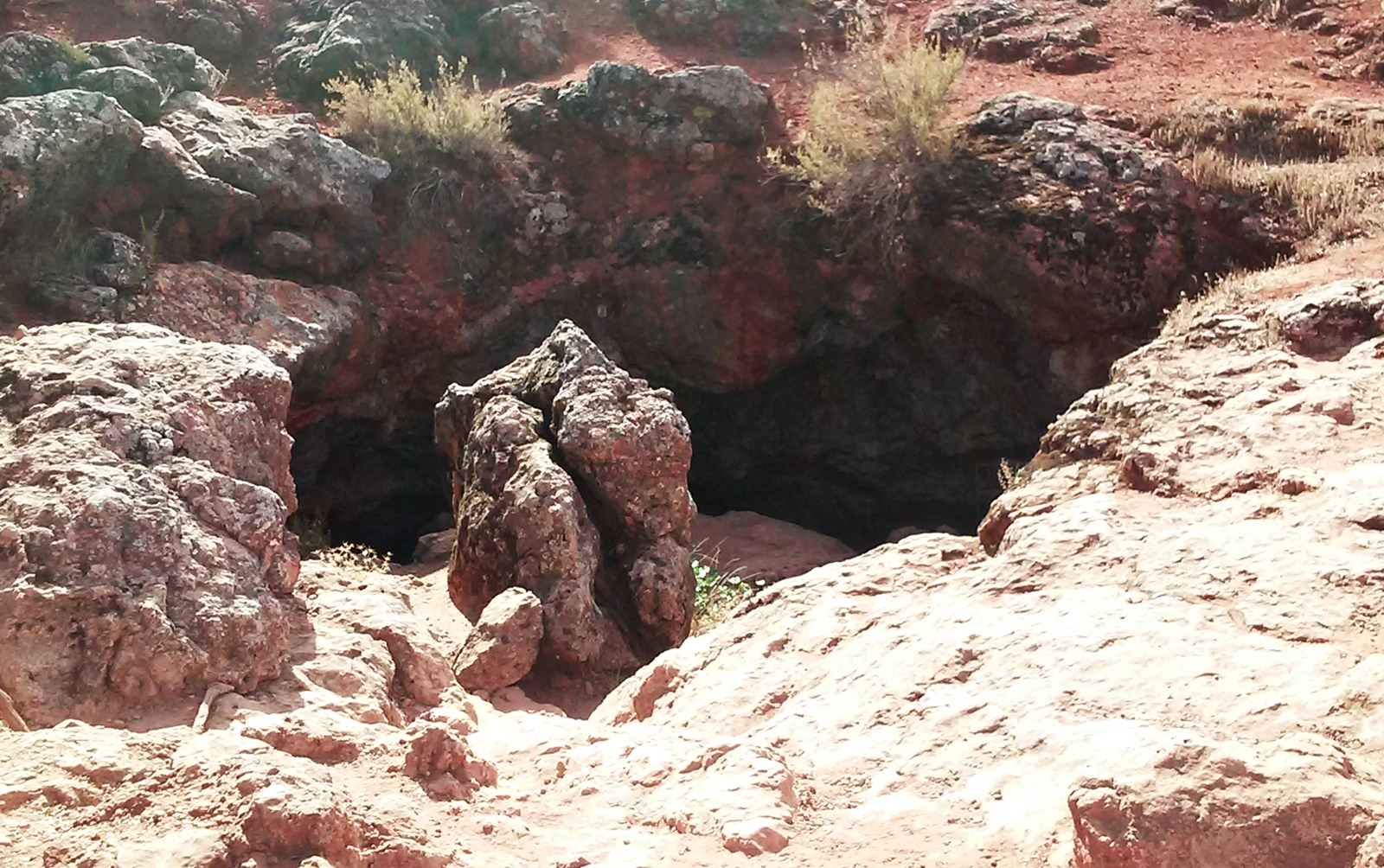
Cueva de Montesinos

Cueva de Montesinos is a cave of the Province of Albacete, Spain. At the bottom of the cave is a small lake formed by rainwater filtering through the cave. It has been discovered through a series of experiments and tests that the water in that lagoon is connected by underground streams with the Lagunas de Ruidera network of lakes.

An episode involving descent into the cave is included in Part II of Miguel de Cervantes's novel Don Quixote.
