= Sanatruk =

King of Armenia (died 109)

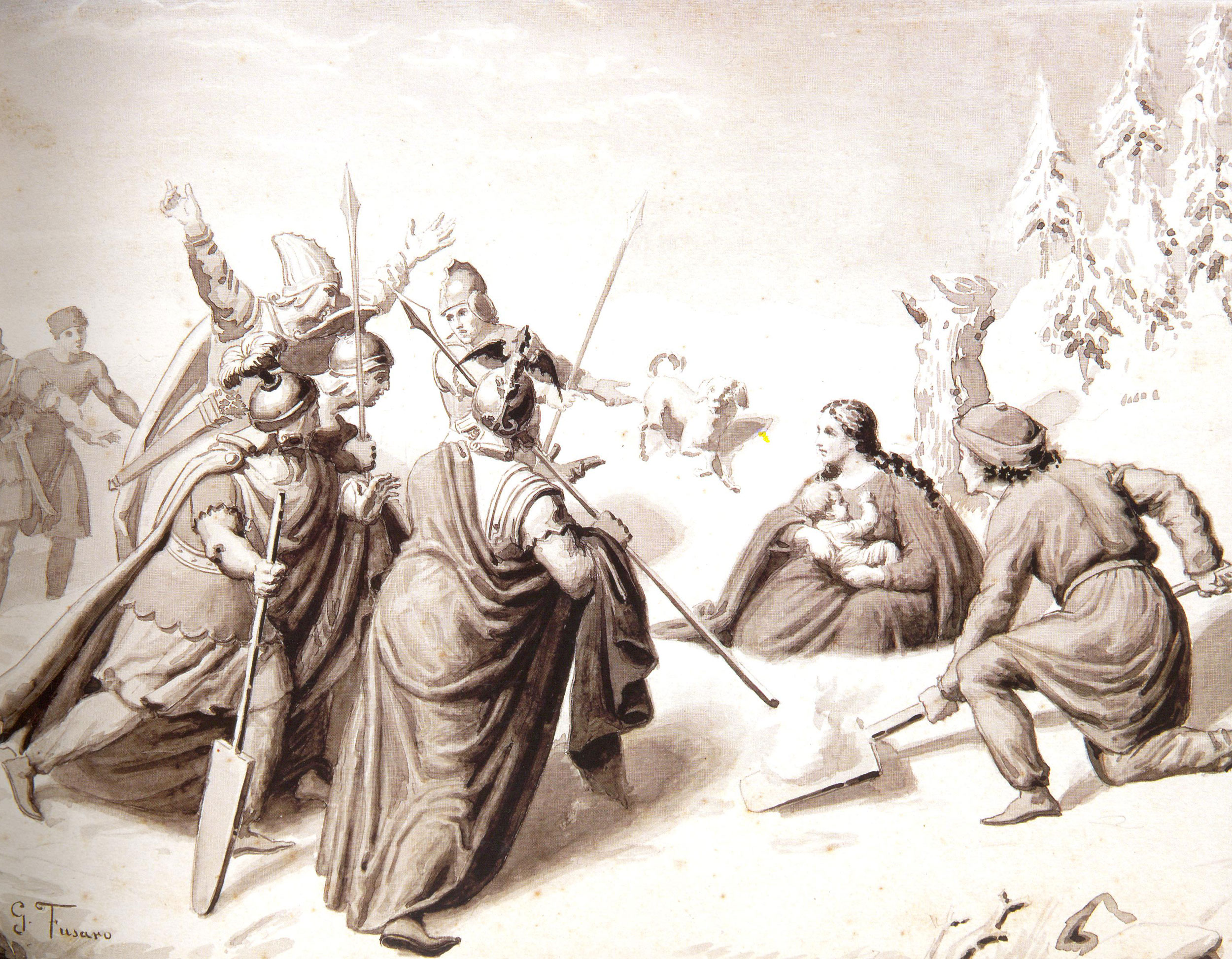
- Sanatruk and Avde after three days in snow storm

King of Armenia
- Reign: ?–109 AD
- Predecessor: Tiridates I
- Successor: Axidares

King of Osroene
- Reign: 91–109 AD
- Predecessor: Abgar VI
- Successor: Abgar VII
- Burial: Arshakid Mausoleum
- Issue: Ghadama; St. Sandukht
- House: Arsacid
- Father: Meherdates
- Mother: Awde of Osroene
- Religion: Zoroastrian

Sanatruk (Latinized as Sanatruces) was a member of the Arsacid dynasty of Armenia who succeeded Tiridates I of Armenia as King of Armenia at the end of the 1st century. He was also King of Osroene (reigned 91–109), a historic kingdom located in Mesopotamia.

== Biography ==
Information regarding his life remains scarce. By cross-referencing various sources, it is generally suggested that Sanatruces reigned during the 2nd century. Some scholars propose that he succeeded Tiridates between 75 and 110 AD; however, this hypothesis lacks definitive evidence and has been rejected by others.

His character and deeds were highly praised by the Greek historian Arrian in his work Parthica, where Sanatruk is held in equal esteem with the most distinguished Greeks and Romans. Conversely, hagiographic tradition blames him for the martyrdom of the Apostles Saint Bartholomew and Saint Thaddeus in Armenia. He is also held responsible for the martyrdom of his own daughter, Saint Sandukht the Virgin.

In 110 AD, the Armenian throne was occupied by Axidares, the son of the Parthian monarch Pacorus II. However, Axidares was deposed by Trajan in 113 AD due to the bypass of Roman consensus regarding the appointment to the Armenian throne. According to several sources and studies, Sanatruces is linked to the anti-Roman uprising that broke out against Trajan in 117 AD, possibly serving as one of its leaders.

According to Movses Khorenatsi, during Sanatruce's childhood, King Abgar's sister, Awde, took him from Edessa to Armenia through the Kordvats (Gordyene) mountains, where they were caught in a snowstorm. They battled the storm for three days, and the child survived thanks to the protection of a white animal. It is suggested that the animal was a white dog, based on the etymology of the name Sanatruces (san—dog, truk—gift/tribute).

The Greek historian Arrian describes Sanatruk as follows:

"Sanatruk, the King of the Armenians, was of medium stature. He had a great passion for everything noble, especially military affairs. He was a champion of justice, and in his daily life, he was restrained, modest, and wise, much like the best of the Greeks and Romans."

However, this idealized portrayal contrasts with Armenian sources, which emphasize his cruelty and ruthlessness, particularly toward Christians. According to Khorenatsi, Sanatruces was the nephew of Abgar. Upon ascending the throne, he promised the people of Edessa not to persecute Christians, but he did not keep his promise. After the execution of his daughter, his wife, who was also named Sandukht, left him. Her final words before her death were:

"It is better to be the wife of a common peasant than that of a child-killing king."

Alongside the Christians, Sanatruces also eliminated all of Abgar's male offspring. Sanatruces is also credited with the reconstruction of Nisibis (Mtsbin) after an earthquake. In 110 AD, he died during a hunt from an arrow shot. He is buried in the Arsacid mausoleum. Several sources give the version that Sanatruces was not the only child of Tiridates, and moreover, he was not the firstborn. Regarding the naming, Tiridates, like all monarchs wishing to establish a dynasty, would have named the presumptive heir either after himself or after an ancestor or relative who played a significant role in the family's history. Thus, it is assumed that Tiridates named his first son Tiridates, the second perhaps Vologases after his brother, the Parthian king, and only the third child was given the name Sanatruces. During Tiridates' lifetime, his sons died, and the throne was given to Sanatruces, who was not actually intended as the heir.

== Reign ==
Sanatruces came to power during a difficult period, when Armenia was under pressure from its powerful neighbors, the Roman Empire and Parthia.

According to Khorenatsi, in 91 AD, Sanatruces campaigned against King Abgar VI (71–91) and conquered and annexed the Kingdom of Osroene-Edessa to Greater Armenia. In his study dedicated to the Kingdom of Osroene, Gutschmid explained the interruption in the Abgarid regnal list (91–109) through this event. According to Greco-Roman historians, Sanatruces also ruled over a part of Syria (Assyria).

Sanatruces established friendly relations with both the Parthian Kingdom and the Roman Empire and engaged in construction projects. On the western side of the Taron province, at the confluence of the Arsanias (Aratsani) and Meghraget rivers—on the western side of the Plain of Mush—he founded the new royal seat, the city of Mtsurk (which was already in ruins by the mid-4th century), and promoted the development of trade and crafts in the country. According to the testimony of Sebeos, the Syriac scholar "Maraba the Philosopher of Mtsurk" lived there and wrote a "History of Armenia" (likely in Greek). The same Sebeos reports that among the ruins of King Sanatruces' palace in the destroyed Mtsurk, in front of the royal palace gates, a Greek inscription carved in stone was found, containing chronological information about the first Armenian and Parthian kings. Based on this fact, Hakob Manandyan hypothesized that Mtsurk served as the seat of Sanatruces' government.

== Death ==
He was buried in the Arsacid mausoleum.

According to Faustus Byzand, in the second half of the 4th century (360 AD), when the troops of the Sasanian King Shapur II destroyed the Arsacid mausoleum, they were unable to demolish Sanatruces' tomb in the fortress of Ani in Daranaghiats—the resting place of the Arsacids (Ani fortress in the province of Daranaghi). It was described as a "gigantic, solid, and skillfully crafted structure".

== Successors of Sanatruces ==
After Sanatruces, with the consent of Roman Emperor Trajan (98–117), Axidares (also known as Ashkhadar or Shiradar, 110–113), the son of the Parthian King Pacorus II (78–110), ascended the throne. Osroes I of Parthia (110–129), who succeeded his brother Pacorus II, considered Axidares unfit for the position. Without consulting Trajan, he deposed him and instead appointed Pacorus II's other son, Parthamasiris, as King of Armenia in 113 AD. This unilateral appointment served as a pretext for new conflicts between the empires and the Parthians. Taking advantage of this situation, Trajan declared war on the Parthians and the Armenians. Consequently, the Treaty of Rhandeia was annulled, and Greater Armenia became a Roman province. Thus, the fifty-year peace (63–113) was disrupted, albeit briefly; in 117 AD, Vologases I (Vagharsh I) was proclaimed the king of an independent Armenia.

== See also ==
- Osroene

== Bibliography ==
- Schottky, Martin (2011). "Sanatruk von Armenien". Anabasis Studia Classica et Orientalia. 2: 231–248. ISSN 2082-8993. (in German)

Sanatruk Arsacid dynasty Born: 1st century Died: 110
Preceded by Tiridates I 66-88	Sanatruces I 88–110	Succeeded by Axidares 110-113
