= Vologases I of Armenia =

King of Armenia from 117 to 140

Vologases I

King of Armenia
- Reign: 117–c. 140–144
- Predecessor: Parthamasiris
- Successor: Sohaemus or Pacorus
- Issue: Ghadana
- House: Arsacid
- Father: Sanatruk?

Vologases I of Armenia (Armenian: Վաղարշ Ա, romanized: Vałarš) or Vagharsh I was a Parthian prince who ruled Armenia from 117 to c. 140–144. He was apparently an Arsacid and is described as the "son of Sanatruces" (King of Armenia 88–110) by Cassius Dio. He became king following the end of the brief Roman annexation of Armenia. He is known to have founded the city of Vagharshapat, which served as the capital of Armenia from 120 to 330, and a number of other settlements that bear his name. Although Armenia prospered during his reign, he was forced to appeal to Rome for assistance against an Alan invasion towards the end of his rule. According to Movses Khorenatsi, he may have died in battle against the invaders. After his death, the Romans made the non-Arsacid Sohaemus the ruler of Armenia, although some scholars believe another Arsacid, Pacorus, held the throne after Vologases' reign.

== Accession to the throne ==
In 110 AD, Armenia was ruled by Axidares, son of King Pacorus of Parthia. Axidares was deposed and replaced by his brother Parthamasiris as a result of a coup in Parthia. The Roman emperor Trajan (r. 98–117) used this as an excuse to begin a war against Parthia. Trajan invaded Sophene in 114 conducted diplomacy with the regional rulers. He met Parthamasiris but refused to recognize him as King of Armenia. The Parthian prince was assassinated soon after, likely on Trajan's orders, and Trajan annexed Armenia as a Roman province, adjoining it to Cappadocia and Lesser Armenia. However, in 116 a rebellion broke out in Armenia under the leadership of Vologases, son of the earlier Armenian king Sanatruk. According to the Greco-Roman historian Cassius Dio, Vologases was about to battle with the Roman general Severus when he asked for a ceasefire, after which Trajan recognized him as ruler over one part of Armenia (most likely the northeastern part of the country, where the Romans could not establish firm control).

Trajan's successor Hadrian (r. 117–138), seeing that Armenia was hostile to Rome and would be too expensive to maintain as a province, withdrew from the country and recognized Vologases as king over all of Greater Armenia; thus, Armenia once again became a vassal kingdom of Rome. (Note: Like Manandyan, Marie Louise Chaumont views Vologases' investiture as a return to the situation established by the Treaty of Rhandeia in the 1st century AD, but unlike Manandyan she describes this as the restoration of Parthian suzerainty over Armenia: "Thus Parthian suzerainty over Armenia on the terms of the treaty of Rhandeia was again formally acknowledged; it was at the same time given practical expression through the investiture of Vologeses.") The Greco-Roman historian Arrian reports that under Hadrian the army of the legate of Cappadocia contained an Armenian unit, which suggests that Armenia remained militarily connected with Cappadocia during Vologases' reign and perhaps also under his successors.

== Founding of Vagharshapat ==
The prolonged period of peace between Rome and Parthia was favorable for international trade and contributed to an economic and cultural upswing in Armenia and the entire Middle East. As Yeremian states, "The development of society and the new revitalization of international trade, with Armenia at its center, created a need for the founding of new cities." In the area of the present-day Etchmiadzin Cathedral and its surroundings, Vologases I founded the city of Vagharshapat, named after himself and literally meaning "settled by Vologases (Vagharsh)". According to the Armenian historian Movses Khorenatsi, Vologases founded Vagharshapat to the south of another city, Vardgesavan. This city existed since the times of the Orontid dynasty of Armenia (4th–3rd centuries BC). Vologases moved his court to Vagharshapat, although under him and his successors Artaxata remained the capital, with Vagharshapat serving as a "second capital". According to Movses Khorenatsi, Vologases I also founded the settlement of Vagharshavan (identified with modern-day Köprüköy, Turkey) at the confluence of the Murts and Araxes rivers in the province of Basen. The founding of another settlement called Vagharshakert is also attributed to Vologases.

== Alan invasion of Armenia ==
Although Armenia "evidently prospered" under Vologases' rule, in the later years of his reign the country suffered an invasion from the north. The weakening of the Roman Empire following the death of Trajan led to an intensification of attacks by the nomadic Alans, who raided the border regions of Armenia and Atropatene and penetrated as far as Cappadocia. King Pharasmanes II of Iberia (r. 230s–250s) took advantage of the situation, expanding his domains toward the Black Sea coast. With Pharasmanes' assistance, the Alans penetrated into Albania and Atropatene and then crossed over Armenia to reach Cappadocia. Vologases was able to stop the Alans' attacks with "gifts", while Roman military preparations in Cappadocia scared the Alans away from there. In 138, Vologases I sent envoys to Rome complaining of Pharasmanes' actions. Emperor Antoninus Pius (r. 138–161) called Pharasmanes to a meeting, ostensibly to call him to account, but instead sent him off with honors.

== End of reign and succession ==
Vologases reign must have ended around 140–143, as a coin of the Roman emperor Antoninus Pius from that time records the "granting" of a new king (not named on the coin) to Armenia. Movses Khorenatsi states that Vologases died in battle against the northern invaders. However, Yeremian (following H. Asturian) writes that Antoninus Pius deposed Vologases, likely in 144, because he was dissatisfied with some aspects of the Armenian king's policy. Others believe that the Romans appointed a new king after Vologases' death. (Note: Manandyan cites both the view that Vologases died and Asturian's view that he was deposed, noting that the latter view is possible but cannot be fully accepted without additional evidence.) Vologases' successor was Sohaemus, who was the "king" of the city of Emesa (modern-day Homs, Syria). Sohaemus, being a supposed descendant of the Achaemenid dynasty, was considered a worthy candidate for the Armenian throne. Sohaemus is also called an Arsacid in a later source, which may merely reflect an attempt to conceal the fact that the appointment of a non-Arsacid to the throne of Armenia was a violation of the Treaty of Rhandeia. (Note: Yeremian assumes that Vologases II, who ruled after Sohaemus, was a member of Vologases I's line, either his grandson or nephew. However, other historians believe that Vologases II was the son of King Vologases IV of Parthia, and that Vologases II later ruled Parthia himself as Vologases V. See also Toumanoff 1969, pp. 242–244 and Toumanoff 1976, p. 73.) Alternatively, it has been suggested that Sohaemus was placed on the Armenian throne later, in the 160s, following the deposal of the Arsacid Pacorus.

== Sources ==
- Asdourian, P. Pascal (1911). Die politischen Beziehungen zwischen Armenien und Rom von 190 v. Chr. bis 428 n. Chr: Ein Abriss der Armenischen Geschichte in dieser Periode (in German). Venice: Mechitaristenbuchdruckerei auf San Lazzaro.
  - Armenian version: Asturean, Harutʻiwn (1912). Kʻaghakʻakan veraberutʻiwnner ěndmēj Hayastani ew Hṛovmay 190ēn n. Kʻ. minchʻew 428 y. Kʻ Քաղաքական վերաբերութիւններ ընդմէջ Հայաստանի եւ Հռովմայ 190էն ն. ք. մինչեւ 428 յ. ք. (PDF). Venice: Tparan S. Ghazar.
- Bournoutian, George A. (2002). A Concise History of the Armenian People: (from Ancient Times to the Present) (2nd ed.). Costa Mesa, CA: Mazda Publishers. ISBN 978-1568591414.
- Chaumont, Marie Louise (1986). "Armenia and Iran ii. The pre-Islamic period". In Yarshater, Ehsan (ed.). Encyclopædia Iranica. Vol. II/4: Architecture IV–Armenia and Iran IV (Online ed.). Encyclopædia Iranica Foundation. pp. 418–438.
- Garsoïan, Nina (1997). "The Aršakuni Dynasty". In Hovannisian, Richard G. (ed.). The Armenian People from Ancient to Modern Times: Volume I: The Dynastic Periods: From Antiquity to the Fourteenth Century. New York: St. Martin's Press. ISBN 0-312-10169-4.
- Manandian, H. A. (1965) [Russian orig. published in Erevan 1954]. The Trade and Cities of Armenia in Relation to Ancient World Trade. Translated from the Second Revised Edition by Nina G. Garsoïan. Lisbon: Livraria Bertrand.
- Manandyan, Hakob (1978). Erker Երկեր [Works]. Vol. 2. Erevan: Haykakan SSH GA hratarakchʻutʻyun.
- Patterson, Lee E. (2013). "Caracalla's Armenia". Syllecta Classica. 2. Project Muse: 27–61. doi:10.1353/syl.2013.0013. S2CID 140178359.
- Redgate, A. E. (1998). The Armenians. Peoples of Europe. Oxford: Blackwell. ISBN 0-631-14372-6.
- Russell, James R. (1987). Zoroastrianism in Armenia. Cambridge, MA: Harvard University Press. ISBN 978-0674968509.
- Toumanoff, Cyril (1969). "The Third-Century Armenian Arsacids: A Chronological and Genealogical Commentary". Revue des études arméniennes. 6: 233–281.
- Toumanoff, Cyrille (1976). Manuel de généalogie et de chronologie pour l'histoire de la Caucasie Chrétienne (Arménie-Géorgie-Albanie) [Genealogical and chronological manual for the history of Christian Caucasia (Armenia-Georgia-Albania)] (in French). Rome: Edizioni Aquila.
- Yeremian, Suren (1971). "Hayastani kʻaghakʻakan vichakě m. tʻ. II darum" Հայաստանի քաղաքական վիճակը մ. թ. II դարում [Armenia's political situation in the 2nd century AD]. In Yeremian, Suren; et al. (eds.). Hay zhoghovrdi patmutʻyun Հայ ժողովրդի պատմություն [History of the Armenian People]. Vol. 1. Erevan: Armenian SSR Academy of Sciences. pp. 765–795.

Vologases I of Armenia Arsacid dynasty Born: 99 Died: 140
Preceded by Parthamasiris 113-114	Vologases I 117-140	Succeeded by Sohaemus 144-161
