= Arsacid dynasty of Armenia =

Dynasty that ruled Armenia from 12 to 428

Arsacid Արշակունի Arshakuni
- Parent house: Arsacids of Parthia
- Country: Kingdom of Armenia
- Founded: 12
- Current head: Extinct
- Final ruler: Artaxias IV
- Titles: King of Armenia
- Dissolution: 428

The Arsacid dynasty, called the Arshakuni (Armenian: Արշակունի, romanized: Arshakuni) in Armenian, ruled the Kingdom of Armenia (with some interruptions) from 12 to 428 AD. The dynasty, a branch of the Arsacid dynasty of Parthia, reigned intermittently throughout the chaotic years following the fall of the Artaxiad dynasty until 62, when Tiridates I, brother of Parthian King Vologases I, secured Arsacid rule in Armenia as a client-king of the Roman Empire. However, he did not succeed in establishing his line on the throne, and various princes of different Arsacid lineages ruled until the accession of Vologases II, who succeeded in establishing his own line on the Armenian throne, which ruled the kingdom until the Sasanian Empire abolished it in 428.

Two of the most notable events in Armenian history during the Arsacid period were the conversion of Armenia to Christianity by Gregory the Illuminator and Tiridates III in the early 4th century; and the creation of the Armenian alphabet by Mesrop Mashtots c. 405. In contrast to the more Hellenic-influenced Artaxiads, Arsacid Armenia featured greater Iranian influence.

== Early Arsacids ==
Kingdom of Armenia under the Arsacid dynasty, 150 AD

The first appearance of an Arsacid on the Armenian throne occurred in 12 when the Parthian king Vonones I was exiled from Parthia for his pro-Roman policies and Occidental manners. Vonones I briefly acquired the Armenian throne with Roman consent, but Artabanus II, incorrectly known as Artabanus III in older scholarship, demanded his deposition, and as Emperor Augustus did not wish to begin a war against the Parthians, he deposed Vonones I and sent him to Syria. Soon after the deposition of Vonones I, Artabanus II installed his son Orodes on the Armenian throne. Emperor Tiberius had no intention of giving up the buffer states of the eastern frontier and sent his nephew and heir Germanicus to the East. Germanicus concluded a treaty with Artabanus II in which he was recognized as king and friend of the Romans.

In 18, Armenia was given to Zeno, son of Polemon I of Pontus, who assumed the Iranian name Artaxias (a.k.a. Zeno-Artaxias). The Parthians under Artabanus II were too distracted by internal strife to oppose the Roman-appointed king. Zeno's reign was remarkably peaceful in Armenian history. After Zeno's death in 36, Artabanus II decided to reinstate an Arsacid on the Armenian throne, choosing his eldest son Arsaces I as a suitable candidate, but his succession to the Armenian throne was disputed by his younger brother Orodes, who had been overthrown by Zeno. Tiberius quickly concentrated more forces on the Roman frontier and once again after a decade of peace, Armenia was to become the theater of bitter warfare between the two greatest powers of the known world for the next 25 years.

Tiberius sent an Iberian, Mithridates, who claimed to be of Arsacid blood. Mithridates successfully subjugated Armenia to Roman rule and deposed Arsaces, inflicting huge devastation upon the country. Surprisingly, Mithridates was summoned back to Rome, where he was kept as a prisoner, and Armenia was given back to Artabanus II, who gave the throne to his younger son Orodes. Another civil war erupted in Parthia upon Artabanus II's death. In the meantime, Mithridates was put back on the Armenian throne, with the help of his brother, Pharasmanes I, and of Roman troops. Civil war continued in Parthia for several years, with Gotarzes eventually seizing the throne in 45.

In 51, Mithridates's nephew Rhadamistus invaded Armenia and killed his uncle. The governor of Cappadocia, Julius Pailinus, decided to conquer Armenia but settled with the crowning of Rhadamistus, who generously rewarded him. Parthian King Vologases I saw an opportunity, invaded Armenia and succeeded in forcing the Iberians to withdraw from Armenia. The harsh winter that followed proved too much for the Parthians, who also withdrew, thus leaving open doors for Rhadamistus to regain his throne. After regaining power, according to Tacitus, the Iberian was so cruel that the Armenians stormed the palace and forced Rhadamistus out of the country, and Vologases I got the opportunity to install his brother, the first Arsacid king, Tiridates on the throne. Tiridates, who had previously been the leader of the Magi, likely played a significant role in promoting Zoroastrianism in Armenia.

== Between Rome and Parthia ==
Unhappy with the growing Parthian influence at their doorstep, Roman Emperor Nero sent General Gnaeus Domitius Corbulo with a large army to the east to install Roman client kings (see Roman–Parthian War of 58–63). After Tiridates I escaped, the Roman client king Tigranes VI was installed. In 61, he invaded the Kingdom of Adiabene, one of the Parthian vassal kingdoms.

Vologases I considered this an act of aggression from Rome and restarted a campaign to restore Tiridates I to the Armenian throne. In the following Battle of Rhandeia in 62, command of the Roman troops was again entrusted to Corbulo, who marched into Armenia and set a camp in Rhandeia, where he made a peace agreement with Tiridates. It stated that Tiridates was recognized as King of Armenia, but he agreed to become a Roman client king and go to Rome to be crowned by Emperor Nero. Tiridates ruled Armenia until his death or deposition around 110, when the Parthian king Osroes I invaded Armenia and enthroned his nephew Axidares, the son of the previous Parthian king, Pacorus II, as King of Armenia.

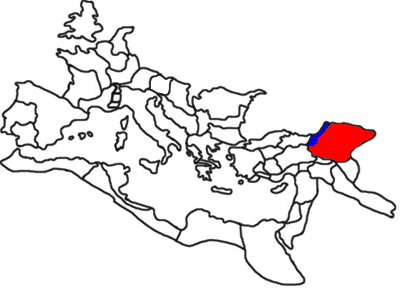
Greater Armenia as part of the Roman Empire (in red), Lesser Armenia (in blue); 117 AD

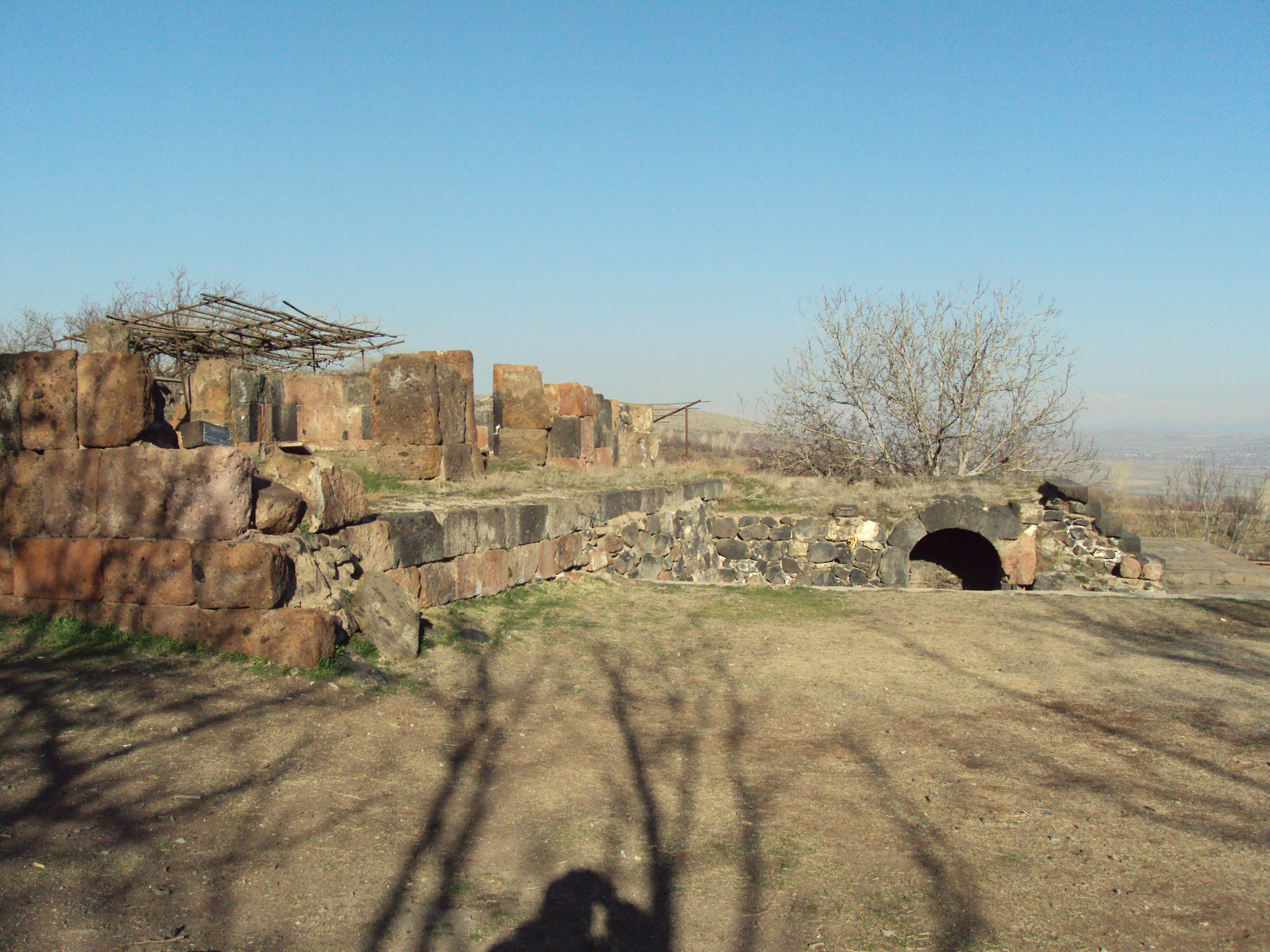
Arshakid Mausoleum: 4th century

The encroachment on the traditional sphere of influence of the Roman Empire started a new war between Parthia and Rome and ended the peace that had endured for about half a century since Nero's time. Roman Emperor Trajan marched towards Armenia in October 113 to restore a Roman client king in Armenia. Envoys from Osroes I met Trajan at Athens, informed him that Axidares had been deposed and asked for Axidares' elder brother, Parthamasiris, to be granted the throne. Trajan declined the proposal and in August 114 captured Arsamosata, where Parthamasiris asked to be crowned, but instead of crowning him, he annexed his kingdom as a new province to the Roman Empire. Parthamasiris was dismissed and died mysteriously soon afterwards.

As a Roman province, Armenia was administered along with Cappadocia by Lucius Catilius Severus. The Roman Senate issued coins that celebrated this occasion and borne the following inscription: ARMENIA ET MESOPOTAMIA IN POTESTATEM P.R. REDACTÆ ('Armenia and Mesopotamia brought back into the power of the people of Rome'). After a rebellion led by a pretender to the Parthian throne (Sanatruces II, son of Mithridates V), was put down, some sporadic resistance continued, and Vologases III had managed to secure a sizeable amount of Armenia just before Trajan's death in August 117. However, in 118, the new Roman emperor, Hadrian, gave up Trajan's conquered lands, including Armenia, and installed Parthamaspates as King of Armenia and Osroene, although the Parthian king Vologases held most Armenian territory. Eventually, a compromise with the Parthians was reached, and Vologases was placed in charge of Armenia.

Vologases ruled Armenia until 140. Vologases IV, the son of the legitimate Parthian King Mithridates V, dispatched his troops to seize Armenia in 161 and eradicated the Roman legions that had been stationed there under legatus Gaius Severianus. Encouraged by the spahbod Osroes, Parthian troops marched further west into Roman Syria.

Marcus Aurelius immediately sent Lucius Verus to the eastern front. In 163, Verus dispatched General Statius Priscus, who had been recently transferred from Roman Britain along with several legions, from Syrian Antioch to Armenia. The Artaxata army, commanded by Vologases IV, surrendered to Priscus, who installed a Roman puppet, Sohaemus (Roman senator and consul of Arsacid and Emessan ancestry), on the Armenian throne and deposed a certain Pacorus, who had been installed by Vologases III.

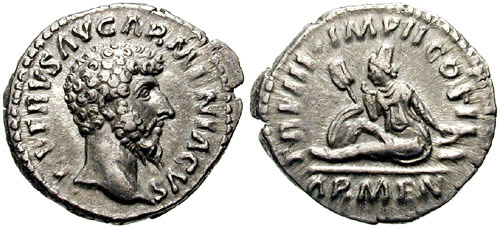
Coin issued to celebrate the victory of Lucius Verus Armeniacus against Vologases IV in the war for Armenia.

As a result of an epidemic within the Roman forces, Parthians retook most of their lost territory in 166 and forced Sohaemus to retreat to Syria. After a few intervening Roman and Parthian rulers, Vologases II assumed the throne in 186. In 198, Vologases II assumed the Parthian throne and named his son Khosrov I to the Armenian throne. Khosrov I was subsequently captured by the Romans, who installed one of their own to take charge of Armenia. However, the Armenians themselves revolted against their Roman overlords, and in accordance with a new Roman-Parthian compromise, Khosrov I's son, Tiridates II (217–252), was made king of Armenia.

== Sassanids and Armenia ==
In 224, Ardashir I overthrew the Arsacid king Artabanus IV of Parthia and established the rule of the Sasanian dynasty in Iran. The Armenian Arsacids were hostile to the new dynasty and considered it their duty to avenge their Parthian kinsmen. A period of greater hostility between Armenia and Sasanian Iran and closer relations between Armenia and Rome began as a result. Armenia was an ally of Rome in the first Roman–Sasanian wars. Shapur I's victories over the Romans led to a period of Sasanian domination over the country. Tiridates II's presumably died after the Battle of Barbalissos in 252, after which Shapur laid waste to the country and installed his own son, Hormizd-Ardashir, on the Armenian throne, leaving Tiridates's heir in exile. Hormizd-Ardashir succeeded Shapur as the Sasanian king in 272, while his brother, Narseh, became the ruler of Armenia.

The recovery of Rome and the internal discord in the Sasanian Empire in the 270s and '80s allowed the restoration of the Arsacid monarchy in Armenia during the reign of Diocletian; however, the details of this restoration are unclear. According to Cyril Toumanoff's chronology, Tiridates II's son Khosrov II was made ruler of the western, Roman part of Greater Armenia in 278/9 as a result of Probus's negotiations with the Sasanians. Khosrov II was killed and succeeded by his brother Tiridates, while Khosrov's son Tiridates (known as 'the Great', called Tiridates IV by Toumanoff) was returned as ruler of Armenia as a consequence of the Peace of Nisibis in 298/9; although others believe that Tiridates the Great was restored to his father's throne already in 287. The Peace of Nisibis also brought the southern districts of Armenia (Sophene, Ingilene, Arzanene, Korduene and Zabdikene) back under Roman influence, but now as separate principalities with the status of autonomous allies (civitates foederatae liberae et immunes).

== Christianization ==
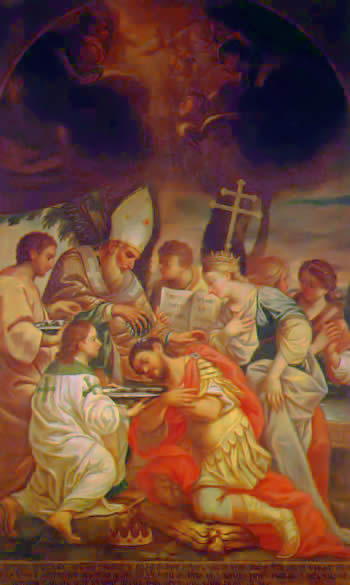
Anachronistic painting of the baptism of King Tiridates III (Trdat III) by St. Gregory the Enlightener.

As late as the later Parthian period, Armenia was predominantly Zoroastrian. In the early 4th century AD, Saint Gregory the Illuminator converted King Tiridates III, a zealous Zoroastrian, and members of his court to Christianity, making Armenia the first state to adopt Christianity as its official religion.

The Armenian alphabet was created by Saint Mesrop Mashtots in 405 AD for the purpose of Bible translation, and Christianization as thus also marks the beginning of Armenian literature. According to Movses Khorenatsi, Isaac of Armenia made a translation of the Gospel from the Syriac text about 411. That work must have been considered imperfect because soon afterward, John of Egheghiatz and Joseph of Baghin, two of Mashtots's students, were sent to Edessa to translate the Biblical scriptures. They journeyed as far as Constantinople and brought back with them authentic copies of the Greek text. With the help of other copies obtained from Alexandria, the Bible was translated again from the Greek according to the text of the Septuagint and Origen's Hexapla. This version, now used by the Armenian Church, was completed about 434.

== Decline ==
During the reign of Tiran, the Sassanid king Shapur II invaded Armenia. During the following decades, Armenia was once again disputed territory between the Byzantine Empire and the Sassanid Empire until a permanent settlement in 387, which remained in place until the Arab conquest of Armenia in 639. Arsacid rulers intermittently (competing with Bagratuni princes) remained in control preserving their power to some extent, as border guardians (marzban) either under Byzantine or as a Sassanian protectorate, until 428.

== Social structure ==
The nakharar system that characterized Armenian society and internal politics for several centuries appears to have originated near or before the beginning of the Common Era, and thus existed during the entire Arsacid period in Armenia and for centuries after its end. It is assumed that Armenia shared this social system with Parthian Iran. Although frequently compared to medieval European feudalism by earlier scholars, more parallels can be found in the Iranian world. As it was in Iran, Armenian society under the nakharar system was divided into three main estates: the nakharars (magnates, corresponding to the Iranian wuzurgān), the azats (lesser nobility, using the same word as in Parthian, āzāt), and the an-azats or non-nobles, consisting of the ramik ("commoners," merchants and artisans) and shinakan (peasants, the overwhelming majority of the population), corresponding to Iranian vastrōšān, who were free, although the peasants could be bound to the land.

The foundation of the system was the great noble houses (tun). The heads of these houses, the nakharars or tanuters, were ranked by precedence according to the seat they occupied at the royal table at court. The nakharars usually remained in their remote fortresses and had "sovereign administrative and judicial power within their domains". They commanded the military forces of their house in wartime. The possessions of the great houses were inalienable and indivisible, and the head of a house managed these possessions with the help of the other male members of the house, called sepuhs. Major state offices were held exclusively by members of particular houses: for example, the office of sparapet (commander-in-chief) was the privilege of the Mamikonian family. While the Arsacid kings tried to reduce the authority of the magnates, they were never able to reach the level of centralization achieved in the Sasanian Empire. The king was viewed only as first among equals among the heads of the great houses and was obligated by custom to consult the magnates on significant occasions. The conflict between the king and nobility weakened the Arsacid crown, but "the strength and permanence of the tun forged a social structure capable of surviving even in moments of political eclipse and the decentralized character of the society diminished its chances of total annexation."

Very little information has survived regarding the lower classes of Arsacid Armenia. Villages and towns were much more common than cities, which were viewed with suspicion. The commoners (ramik) had some rights and sometimes appear at councils together with the aristocracy. The peasants owed their lord taxes and labor (similar to the Western European corvée) and served in the military as auxiliary infantry. Slaves were mostly prisoners of war; they were particularly associated with the temple estates and were seemingly less common in other places. The temple estates were managed by a hereditary caste of priests called kurm; these had their own military units.

== Culture ==
Out of the three phases (Achaemenid, Arsacid, Sasanian) of Iranian influence in Armenia, the Arsacid one was the strongest and most enduring. The phase began with the ascendance of the Parthians in the 2nd century BC and reached its zenith following the establishment of an Arsacid branch on the Armenian throne in the mid-1st century AD. The Arsacid kings of Armenia attempted to base their court on the same model as the one in Ctesiphon. Many Parthian aspects were directly imported into Armenian civilization, such as the gusan, which resembled a bard or minstrel. In Arsacid Armenia, the custom of aristocratic children being raised by foster parents or tutors was widespread, as in the rest of the Iranian commonwealth.

The Arsacid kings knew Parthia and regarded it as their native country. Tiridates III (r. 298–330) is known to have said the following thing during a speech: "For I know the country of the Greeks and that of the Romans very well, and our regions of Parthia—for it is even our home—as well as Asorestan, Arabia and Atropatene." Under the Arsacids, the Armenians became familiar with some of the stories that were later added into the Persian epic Shahnameh. They include the stories of figures such as Hraseak (Afrasiyab), Shawarsh (Siyavash) and Spandarat (Esfandiyar).

The Armenians viewed the bond between their country and the royal houses of Parthia as indestructible. Armenian sources use the terms "king" and "Arsacid" (Aršakuni) as synonyms. The Arsacid king was regarded as the bnak tērn ašxarhis ("natural lord of this country"). The Epic Histories, a 5th-century Armenian history based on oral epic sources, contain statements which deny that the sins of the Arsacid kings could make them unworthy of ruling.

=== Imperial ideology and religious practices ===
The Arsacids were advocates of Iranian legitimacy, which they remained even after the fall of the Parthian Empire. They insisted that they carried the xwarrah ("fortune", cognate of Armenian pʿaṙkʿ), which was the divine glory wielded by legitimate Iranian and Iranic kings. The city of Ani served as the centre of the cult of Aramazd (the Armenian equivalent of Ahura Mazda), as well as the royal necropolis of the Arsacids. In the same fashion as the Achaemenid Empire (550–330 BC), the Arsacids of Armenia and Iran practiced entombment and burial, probably doing it with great care to avoid contaminating the sacred earth of the Zoroastrian yazata (angelic divinity) Spenta Armaiti. The bones of the buried Arsacid kings were believed to carry their xwarrah, which was the reason that the Sasanian shahanshah Shapur II had their bones disinterred and taken out of Armenia after his raid on the necropolis. The tombs were seemingly strongly fortified since Shapur II was unable to open the tomb of Sanatruk.

The ancient sanctuary of Bagawan was of high importance to the Arsacids, who celebrated the Iranian New Year's festival (Nowruz) there. The boar, which was the favourite totem of the yazata Verethragna (Vahagn in Armenian), was the symbol of the Arsacids.

=== Language and naming traditions ===
While the culture of Armenia was dominated by Hellenism under the Artaxiads, the reign of the Arsacids marked the predominance of Iranianism in the country, with Parthian replacing Greek as the language of the educated. However, Armenian Hellenism was not eradicated, as the Arsacids of Iran were proud philhellenes. As long as Armenian was merely the langage of the masses, the Parthian language predominated amongst the upper class and at the court. It was during that period that Classical Armenian incorporated most of its Iranian loanwords. The modern historians R. Schmitt and H. W. Bailey compare the Parthian influence on Armenian to that of the French influence on English after the Norman Conquest of 1066.

After their conversion to Christianity, the Arsacids continued to preserve their Iranian naming traditions, as demonstrated by the male names Trdat, Khosrov, Tiran, Arshak, Pap, Varazdat and Vramshapuh and the female names Ashkhen, Zarmandukht, Khosrovdukht, Ormazdukht, Vardandukht. Notably the name of Nerses I's mother, Bambishn, means "queen" in Persian. Overall, the Christian Arsacids remained true to their Arsacid Iranian traditions. Middle Persian was the court and administrative language at the time of the creation of the Armenian alphabet (the early 5th century, in the last decades of the Arsacid monarchy); the adoption of written Armenian greatly reduced the significance of Middle Persian, although the latter continued to play some role in the Sasanian-ruled part of Armenia. Greek and Syriac were used in the Church until replaced by written Armenian.

== Arsacid kings of Armenia ==
This is a list of the kings of Armenia c. 12 – 428, most of whom were members of the Arsacid dynasty. The list also mentions the non-dynastic rulers of Armenia as well as periods of interregnum. Note that some dates are approximations.

- Vonones I 12–18
- Artaxias III (Zeno Artaxias, non-Arsacid) 18–34
- Arsaces I of Armenia 35
- Mithridates of Armenia (Pharnavazid dynasty) 35–37
- Orodes of Armenia 37–42
- Mithridates of Armenia (again) 42–51
- Rhadamistus (Pharnavazid dynasty) 51–53, 54–55
- Tiridates/Trdat I 52–58, 62–66, officially 66–88
- Tigranes VI (Herodian dynasty) 59–62
- Sanatruces (Sanatruk) 88–110
- Axidares (Ashkhadar) 110–113
- Parthamasiris (Partamasir) 113–114
- Roman annexation 114–117/8
- Vologases I (Vagharsh I) 117/8–144
- Sohaemus (non-Arsacid) 144–161, 164–186
- Pacorus (Bakur) 161–164
- Vologases II (Vagharsh II) 186–198
- Khosrov I 198–217
- Trdat II 217–252
- Khosrov II c. 252
- Hormizd-Ardashir (Sassanid dynasty) 252 – c. 270
- Narseh (Sassanid dynasty) c. 271 – 293
- Trdat III 287–330
- Khosrov III 330–339
- Tiran 339 – c. 350
- Arshak II c. 350 – 368
- Sassanid conquest (Shapur II) 368–370
- Pap 370–374
- Varazdat 374–378
- Arshak III 378–387 with co-ruler Vagharshak 378–386
- Khosrov IV 387–389
- Vramshapuh 389–417
- Possibly Khosrov IV (again) 417–418
- Shapur (Sassanid dynasty) 418–422
- Artashes/Artashir 422–428

== Sources ==
- Boyce, Mary (2001). Zoroastrians: Their Religious Beliefs and Practices. Psychology Press. ISBN 978-0415239035.
- Binns, John (2002). An Introduction to the Christian Orthodox Churches. Cambridge University Press. ISBN 0-521-66738-0.
- Canepa, Matthew (2018). The Iranian Expanse: Transforming Royal Identity Through Architecture, Landscape, and the Built Environment, 550 BCE–642 CE. Oakland: University of California Press. ISBN 9780520379206.
- Dąbrowa, Edward (2012). "The Arsacid Empire". In Daryaee, Touraj (ed.). The Oxford Handbook of Iranian History. Oxford University Press. pp. 1–432. ISBN 978-0-19-987575-7. Archived from the original on 2019-01-01.
- Grousset, R. (1947). Histoire de l'Arménie des Origines à 1071 [History of Armenia from its origins to 1071] (in French). Paris: Payot.
- Adalian, Rouben Paul (2010). "Chronology". Historical Dictionary of Armenia. The Scarecrow Press, Inc.
- Adalian, Rouben Paul (2010a). "Arshakuni/Arsacid". Historical Dictionary of Armenia. The Scarecrow Press, Inc.
- Edwards, Iorwerth Eiddon Stephen; Gadd, Cyril John; Hammond, Nicholas Geoffrey Lemprière; Boardman, John; Walbank, Frank William; Lewis, David Malcolm; Bowman, Alan; Astin, A. E.; Garnsey, Peter (1970). The Cambridge Ancient History: Volume 12, The Crisis of Empire, AD 193-337. Cambridge University Press. ISBN 978-0-521-30199-2.
- Van Lint, Theo (2022). "Isaac the Great, St". In Louth, Andrew (ed.). The Oxford Dictionary of the Christian Church (4th online ed.). Oxford University Press. ISBN 9780191744396.
- Lenski, Noel (2002). Failure of Empire: Valens and the Roman State in the Fourth Century A.D. University of California Press. ISBN 978-0-520-28389-3.
- Chaumont, M. L. (1986). "Armenia and Iran ii. The pre-Islamic period". In Yarshater, Ehsan (ed.). Encyclopædia Iranica. Vol. II/4: Architecture IV–Armenia and Iran IV. London and New York: Routledge & Kegan Paul. pp. 418–438. ISBN 978-0-71009-104-8.
- Curtis, Vesta Sarkhosh (2016). "Ancient Iranian Motifs and Zoroastrian Iconography". In Williams, Markus; Stewart, Sarah; Hintze, Almut (eds.). The Zoroastrian Flame Exploring Religion, History and Tradition. I.B. Tauris. pp. 179–203. ISBN 9780857728159.
- Garsoïan, Nina (1985). Armenia between Byzantium and the Sasanians. Variorum Reprints. ISBN 978-0860781660.
- Garsoïan, N. (2005). "Naxarar". In Yarshater, Ehsan (ed.). Encyclopædia Iranica (Online ed.). Encyclopædia Iranica Foundation.
- Garsoïan, Nina (2004) [First published 1997]. "The Aršakuni Dynasty". In Hovannisian, Richard G. (ed.). The Armenian People From Ancient to Modern Times, Volume I: The Dynastic Periods: From Antiquity to the Fourteenth Century. Palgrave Macmillan. ISBN 1-4039-6421-1.
- Hacikyan, Agop Jack; Basmajian, Gabriel; Franchuk, Edward S.; Ouzounian, Nourhan, eds. (2000). The Heritage of Armenian Literature: From the oral tradition to the Golden Age. Vol. I. Wayne State University Press.
- Lang, David M. (1983). "Iran, Armenia and Georgia". In Yarshater, Ehsan (ed.). The Cambridge History of Iran: The Seleucid, Parthian and Sasanian Periods. Vol. 3(1). Cambridge: Cambridge University Press. pp. 505–536. ISBN 0-521-20092-X.
- Pourshariati, Parvaneh (2008). Decline and Fall of the Sasanian Empire: The Sasanian-Parthian Confederacy and the Arab Conquest of Iran. London and New York: I.B. Tauris. ISBN 978-1-84511-645-3.
- Olbrycht, Marek Jan (2016). "Germanicus, Artabanos II of Parthia, and Zeno Artaxias in Armenia". Klio. 98 (2): 605–633. doi:10.1515/klio-2016-0044. S2CID 193648886.
- Rapp, Stephen H. (2014). The Sasanian World through Georgian Eyes: Caucasia and the Iranian Commonwealth in Late Antique Georgian Literature. Farnham: Ashgate Publishing. ISBN 978-1-4724-2552-2.
- Russell, James R. (1987). Zoroastrianism in Armenia. Harvard University Press. ISBN 978-0674968509.
- Russell, James R. (2004). Armenian and Iranian studies. Harvard Armenian Texts and Studies. Vol. 9. Harvard University Press. ISBN 978-0935411195.
- Schmitt, R.; Bailey, H. W. (1986). "Armenia and Iran iv. Iranian influences in Armenian Language". In Yarshater, Ehsan (ed.). Encyclopædia Iranica. Vol. II/4: Architecture IV–Armenia and Iran IV. London and New York: Routledge & Kegan Paul. pp. 445–465. ISBN 978-0-71009-104-8.
- Stoyanov, Yuri (2000). The Other God: Dualist Religions from Antiquity to the Cathar Heresy. Yale University Press. ISBN 9780300082531. ""Early in the fourth century the Arsacid king of Armenia, Tiridates IV, who began his reign as a zealous Zoroastrian, was converted to Christianity by St Gregory the Illuminator..."
- Tacitus. Annals (in Latin).
- Toumanoff, C. (1986). "Arsacids vii. The Arsacid dynasty of Armenia". Encyclopaedia Iranica, Vol. II, Fasc. 5. pp. 543–546.
