= Akhs =

Akhs or AKHS may refer to:

- Aghtsk, town in Armenia
- Akh, ancient Egyptian concept of soul
- Aga Khan Health Services (AKHS)
- Ardrey Kell High School, located in Charlotte, North Carolina, United States
