= Osroes I =

2nd-century Parthian contender and king

Osroes I 𐭇𐭅𐭎𐭓𐭅
- King of Kings
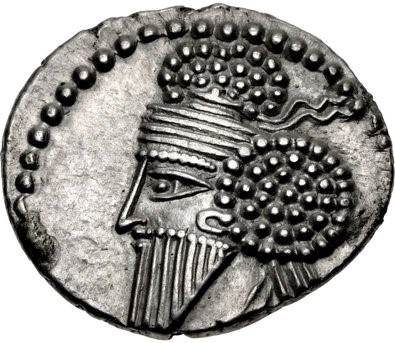
- Silver coin of Osroes I, Ecbatana mint

King of the Parthian Empire
- 1st Reign: 109–116
- Predecessor: Pacorus II
- Successor: Parthamaspates
- 2nd Reign: 117–129
- Predecessor: Parthamaspates
- Successor: Vologases III
- Died: 129
- Issue: Parthamaspates
- House: Arsacid dynasty
- Religion: Zoroastrianism

Osroes I (also spelled Chosroes I or Khosrow I; Parthian: 𐭇𐭅𐭎𐭓𐭅 Husrōw) was a Parthian contender, who ruled the western portion of the Parthian Empire from 109 to 129, with a one-year interruption. For most of his reign he contended with the rival king Vologases III (r. 110–147) who was based in the eastern provinces. In 116, Osroes I was briefly ousted from his throne at Ctesiphon during an invasion by Roman emperor Trajan (r. 98–117), who installed Osroes' son, Parthamaspates. After Trajan's death the following year, Osroes I's rule was reinstated by the Parthian nobility. In 129, he was removed from power by Vologases III.

== Biography ==
In 109, Osroes I revolted against Parthian king Pacorus II (r. 78–110) in order to claim the throne for himself. During the reign of Pacorus II's son Vologases III (r. 110–147), Osroes I managed to seize the western part of the empire, including Mesopotamia, while Vologases III ruled in the east. In 113, Osroes I violated the Treaty of Rhandeia with the Romans by deposing Vologases III's brother Axidares and appointing the latter's brother Parthamasiris as the king of Armenia. This gave the Roman emperor Trajan (r. 98–117) the pretext to invade the Parthian domain and take advantage of the ongoing civil war between Vologases III and Osroes I. In 114, Trajan conquered Armenia and turned it into a Roman province. In 116, Trajan captured Seleucia and Ctesiphon, the capitals of the Parthians. Trajan even reached as far as the Persian Gulf, where he forced the Parthian vassal ruler of Characene, Attambelos VII, to pay tribute. Fearing a revolt by the Parthians, Trajan installed Osroes I's son Parthamaspates on the throne at Ctesiphon. During his expedition, Trajan captured a daughter of Osroes I, who remained a Roman captive until the peace treaty concluded between the two powers in 129.

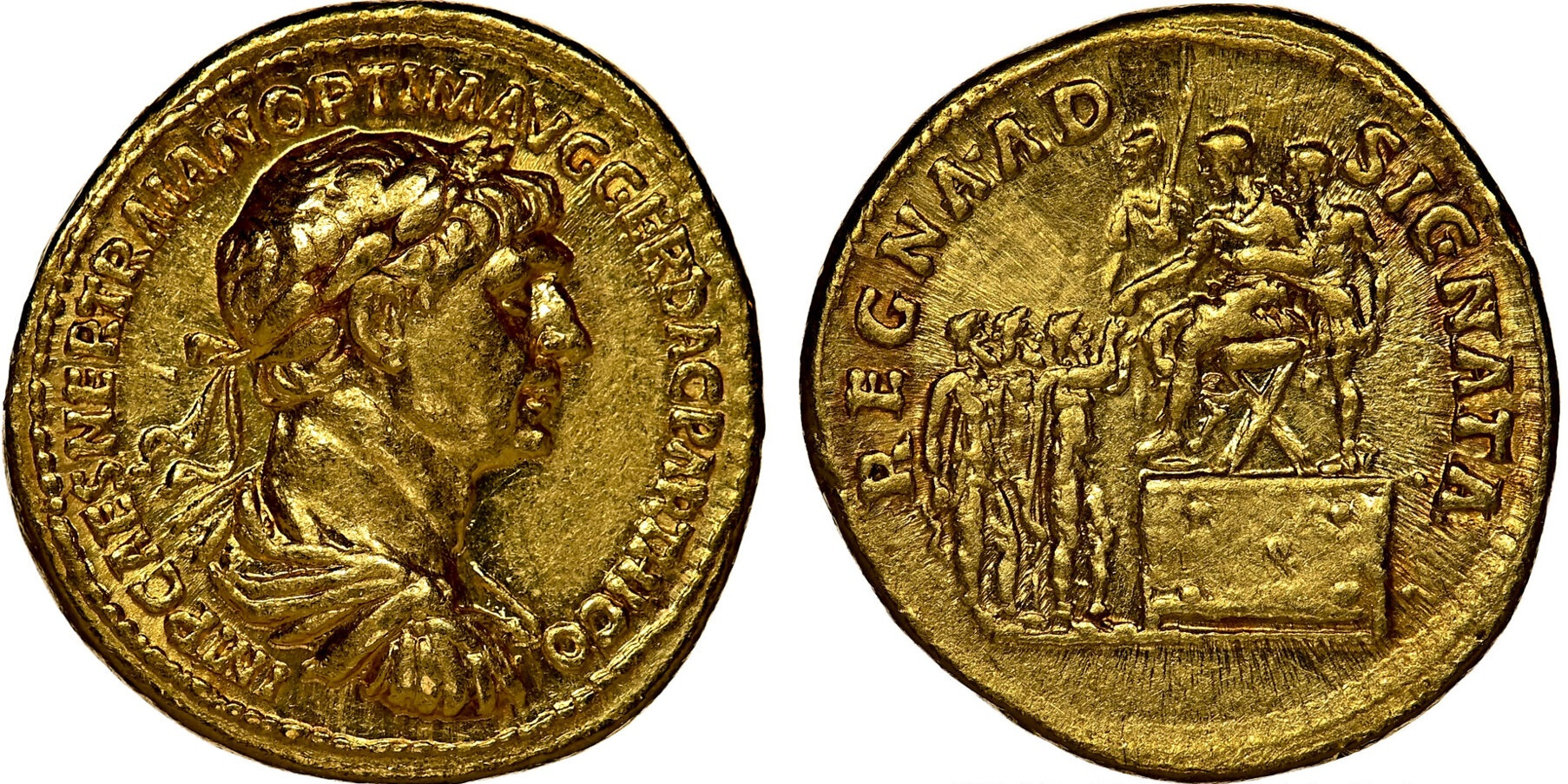
This coin depicting Trajan's victories in the East over Armenia, Mesopotamia, and Parthia. The emperor is awarding a diadem to Parthamaspates, son of Parthian emperor Osroes I, assigned to manage the freshly conquered territories.

The gains of Trajan were short-lived. Revolts occurred in all the conquered territories, with the Babylonians and Jews pushing the Romans out of Mesopotamia, and the Armenians under Sanatruk causing the Romans problems. After Trajan's death in 117, the Parthians removed Parthamaspates from the throne and reinstated Osroes I. Trajan's successor, Hadrian (r. 117–138) renounced the remnants of Trajan's conquests in the east, and acknowledged the Treaty of Rhandeia, with the Parthian prince Vologases becoming the new king of Armenia. The weakened state of the western part of the Parthian Empire gave Vologases III (whose eastern domains were untouched) the opportunity to regain lost territory seized by Osroes I. In 129, Vologases III finally managed to remove Osroes I from power.

== Coinage ==
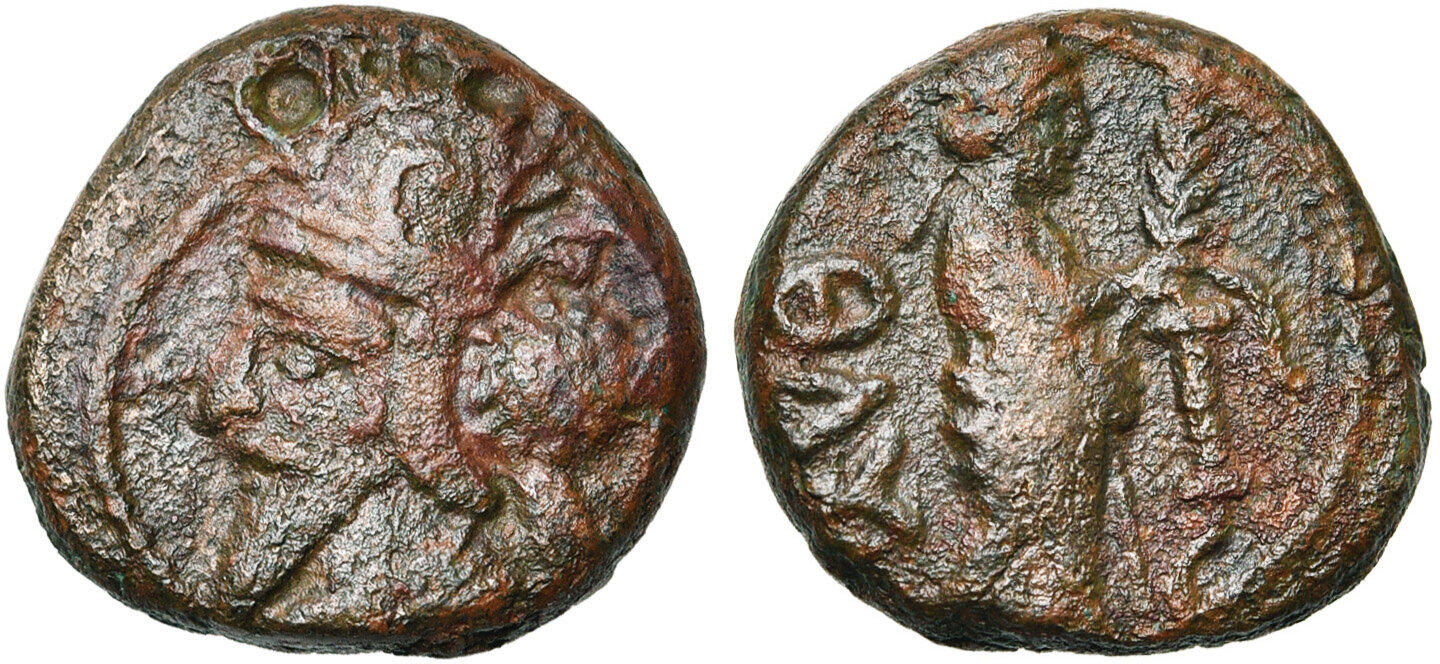
Tetrachalque of Osroes I; Seleucia mint

On the obverse of his silver coins, Osroes I is portrayed with his hair in bunches, whilst wearing a diadem. On his bronze coins, however, he is portrayed with a tiara with hooks and a horn on the side. The coins of Osroes I closely resembles that of his namesake, the Elymais ruler Osroes, which has led to scholars to suggest that they might have been the same person. Another possibility is that the Elymais ruler Osroes copied the coinage of Osroes I of Parthia.

== Sources ==
- Badian, Ernst (2002). "Hadrian". Encyclopaedia Iranica, Vol. XI, Fasc. 4. p. 458.
- Bivar, A.D.H. (1983). "The Political History of Iran Under the Arsacids". In Yarshater, Ehsan (ed.). The Cambridge History of Iran: The Seleucid, Parthian and Sasanian Periods. Vol. 3(1). Cambridge: Cambridge University Press. pp. 21–99. ISBN 0-521-20092-X.
- Chaumont, M. L. (1986). "Armenia and Iran ii. The pre-Islamic period". Encyclopaedia Iranica, Vol. II, Fasc. 4. pp. 418–438.
- Chaumont, M. L.; Schippmann, K. (1988). "Balāš". Encyclopaedia Iranica, Vol. III, Fasc. 6. pp. 574–580.
- Dąbrowa, Edward (2012). "The Arsacid Empire". In Daryaee, Touraj (ed.). The Oxford Handbook of Iranian History. Oxford University Press. pp. 1–432. ISBN 978-0-19-987575-7. Archived from the original on 2019-01-01.
- Gregoratti, Leonardo (2017). "The Arsacid Empire". In Daryaee, Touraj (ed.). King of the Seven Climes: A History of the Ancient Iranian World (3000 BCE - 651 CE). UCI Jordan Center for Persian Studies. pp. 1–236. ISBN 9780692864401.
- Hansman, John F. (1998). "Elymais". Encyclopaedia Iranica, Vol. VIII, Fasc. 4. pp. 373–376.
- Kettenhofen, Erich (2004). "Trajan". Encyclopaedia Iranica. pp. 418–438.
- Kia, Mehrdad (2016). The Persian Empire: A Historical Encyclopedia. ABC-CLIO. ISBN 978-1610693912. (2 volumes)
- Madreiter, Irene; Hartmann, Udo (2020). "Women at the Arsacid court (draft)". E. Carney / S. Müller, the Routledge Companion to Women and Monarchy in the Ancient Mediterranean: 1–15.
- Olbrycht, Marek Jan (1997). "Parthian King's tiara - Numismatic evidence and some aspects of Arsacid political ideology". 2: 27–61.
- Olbrycht, Marek Jan (2016). "The Sacral Kingship of the early Arsacids. I. Fire Cult and Kingly Glory": 91–106.
- Rezakhani, Khodadad (2013). "Arsacid, Elymaean, and Persid Coinage". In Potts, Daniel T. (ed.). The Oxford Handbook of Ancient Iran. Oxford University Press. ISBN 978-0199733309.

Osroes I Arsacid dynasty Died: 129
Preceded by Pacorus II	King of the Parthian Empire; 109–116	Succeeded by Parthamaspates
Preceded by Parthamaspates	King of the Parthian Empire; 117–129	Succeeded by Vologases III
