= Aghdzk =

Aghdzk Աղձք
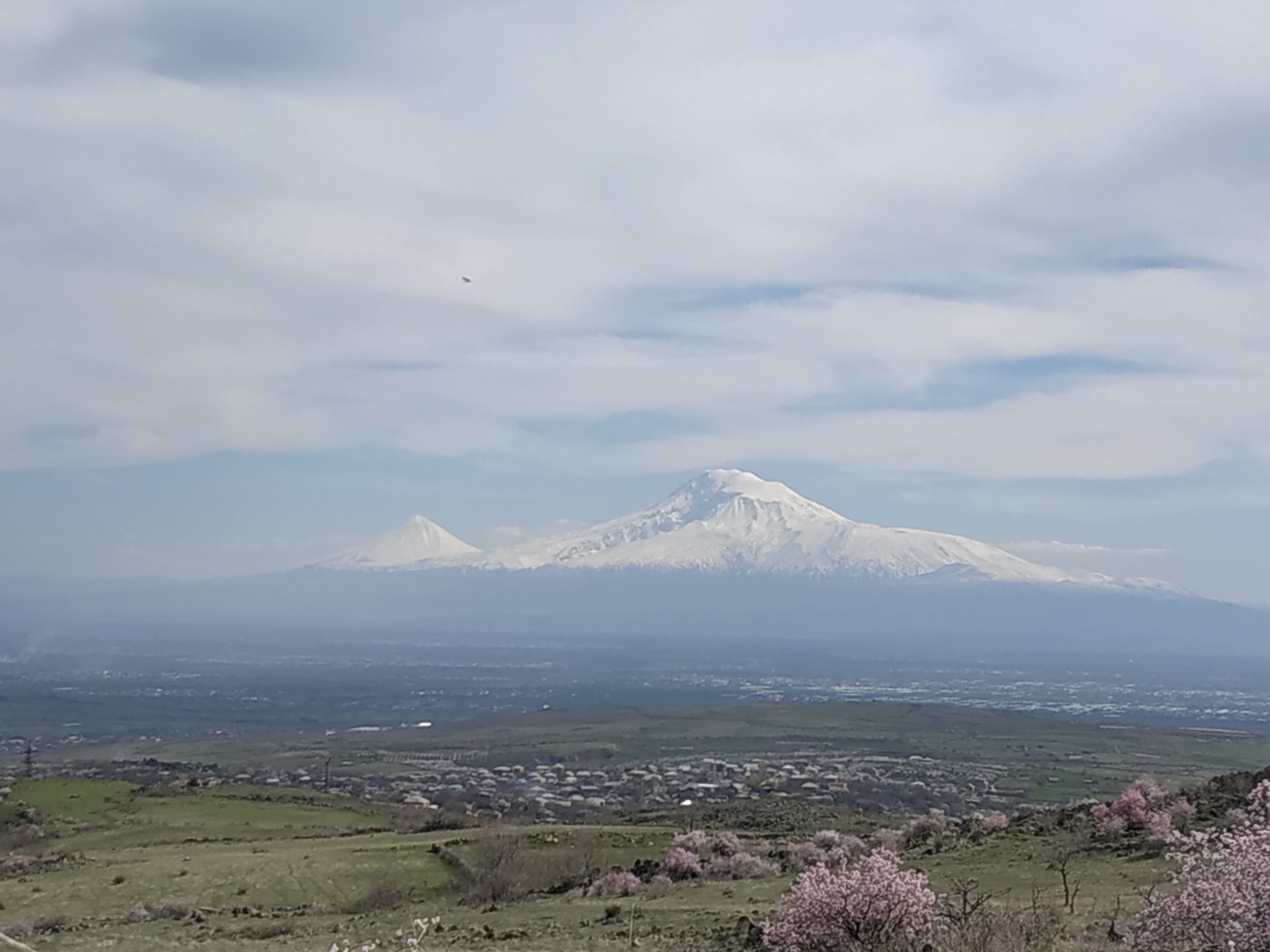
- Aghtsk

- Location within Armenia Location within Aragatsotn
- Coordinates: 40°18′59″N 44°15′13″E
- Country: Armenia
- Province: Aragatsotn
- Municipality: Ashtarak
- Elevation: 1,260 m (4,130 ft)

Population (2011)
  - Total: 1,614
- Time zone: UTC+4
  - Summer (DST): UTC+5

Aghdzk (Armenian: Աղձք) is a village in the Ashtarak Municipality of the Aragatsotn Province of Armenia. It is home to the Arshakid Mausoleum, a large grave monument complex and basilica of the 4th to 5th centuries. King Shapur II of Persia exhumed the bones of the Armenian kings and took them to Persia symbolically taking Armenia's power. When Sparapet Vassak Mamikonian defeated the Persians and reclaimed the bones of the Arshakuni monarchs, he buried them at Aghdzk. Remains of the monuments and the basilica may still to be seen.

Aghdzk is the birthplace of Catholicos Komitas I of Armenia (6th century-628).

== Gallery ==
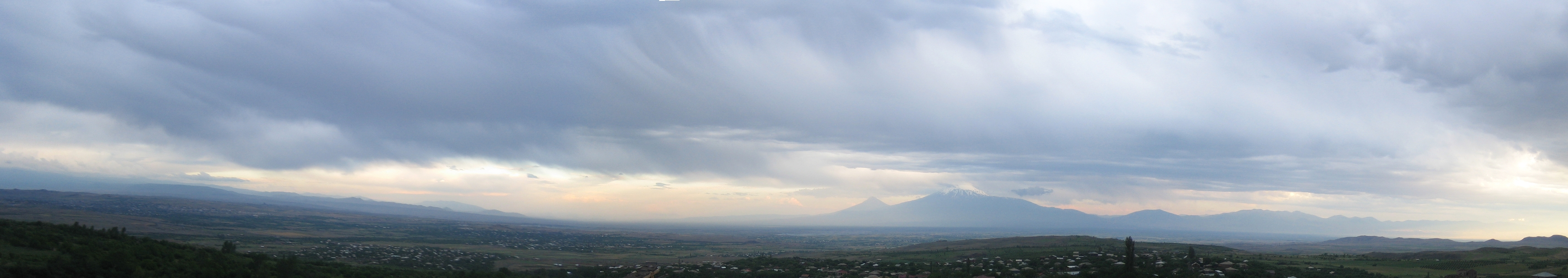
Panorama view of Mount Ararat and the Ararat plain from Dzorap
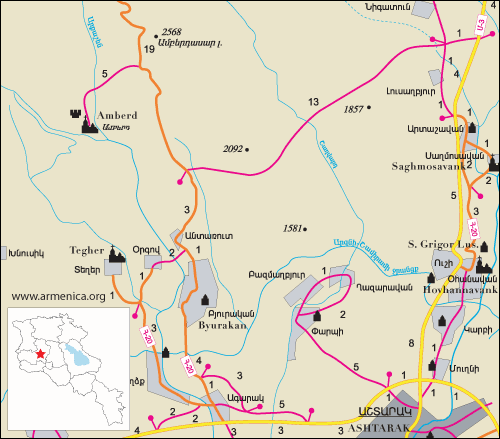
Road map of Aghdzk and region

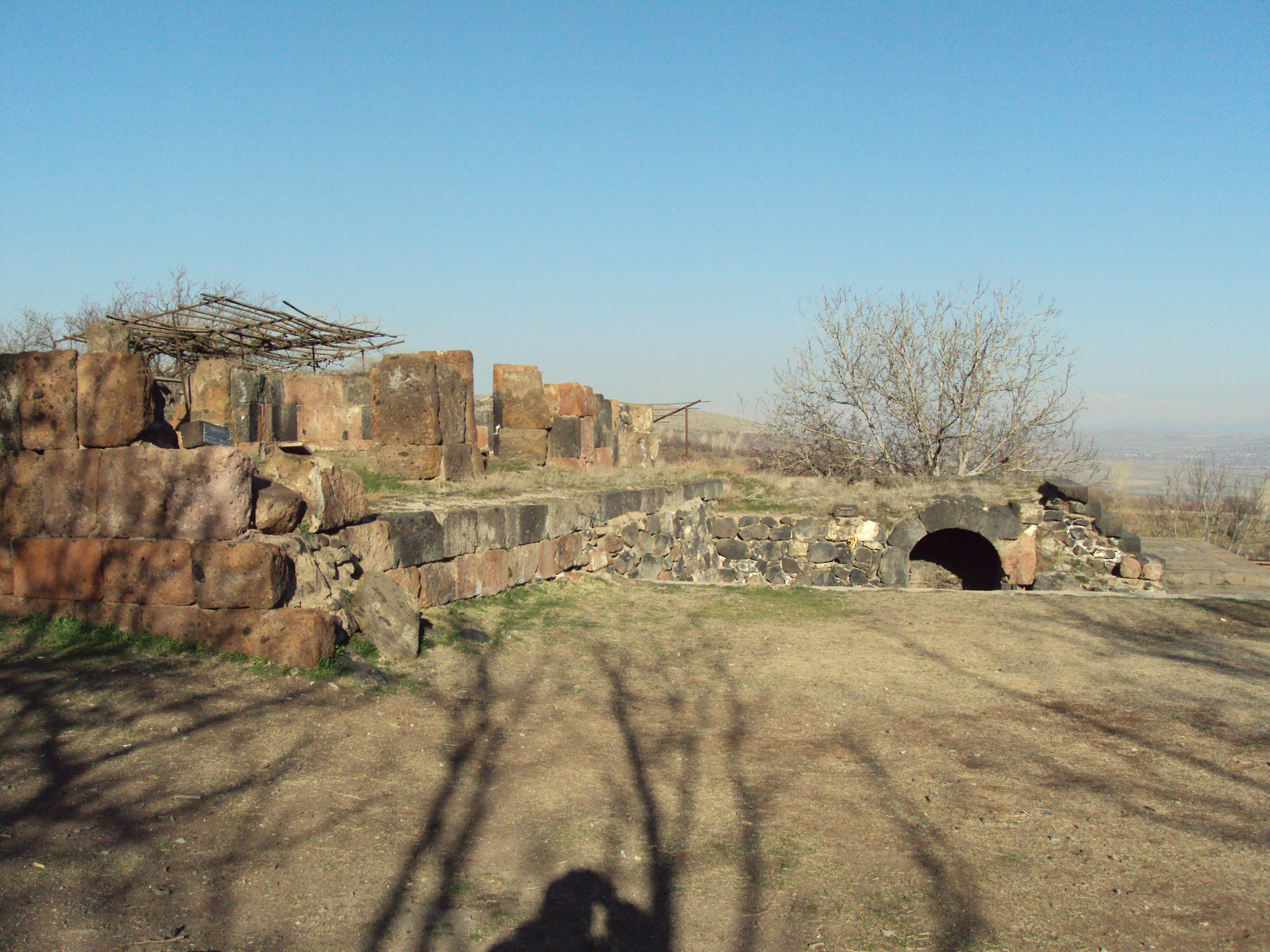
Arshakid Mausoleum

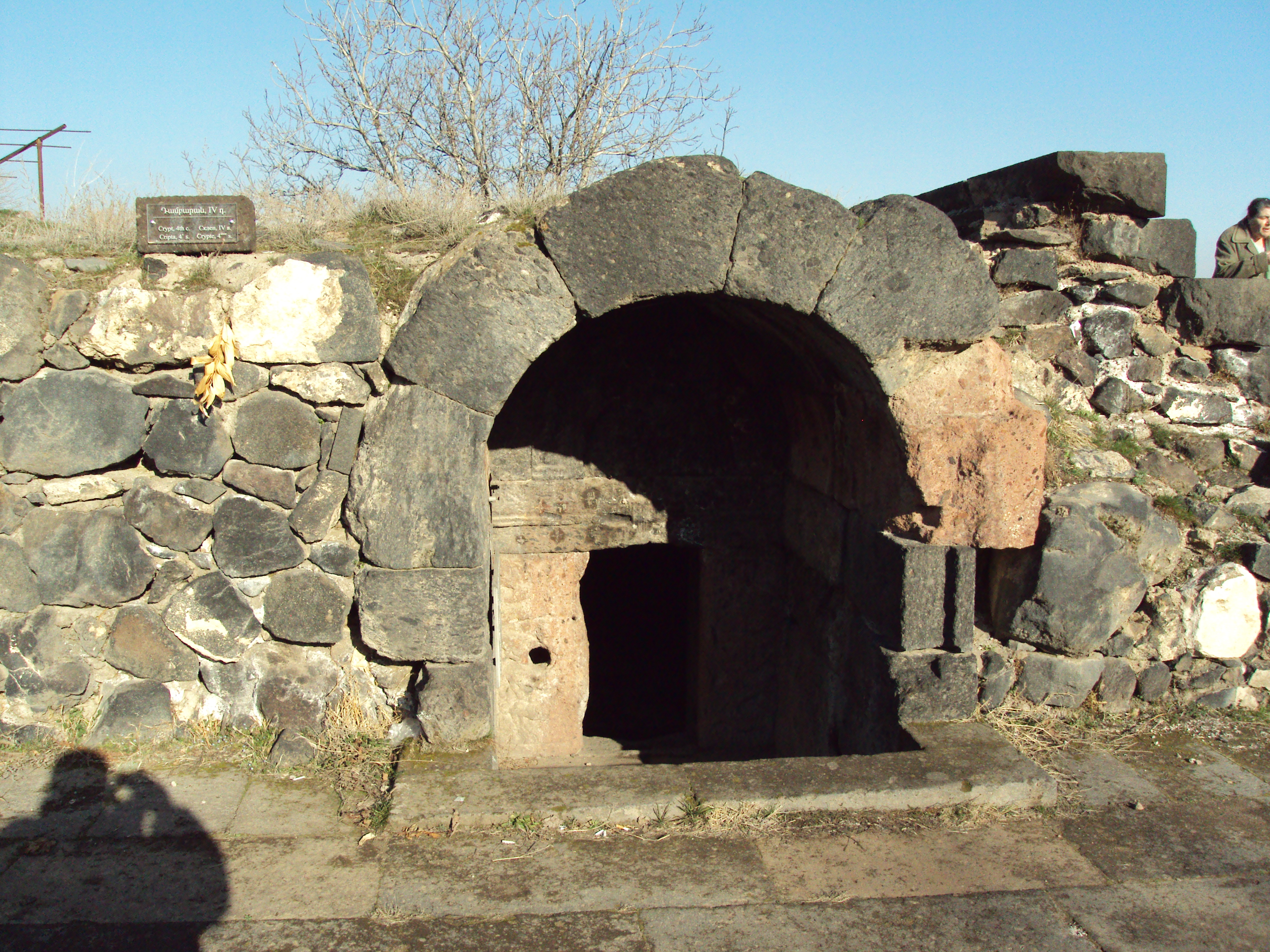
Entrance

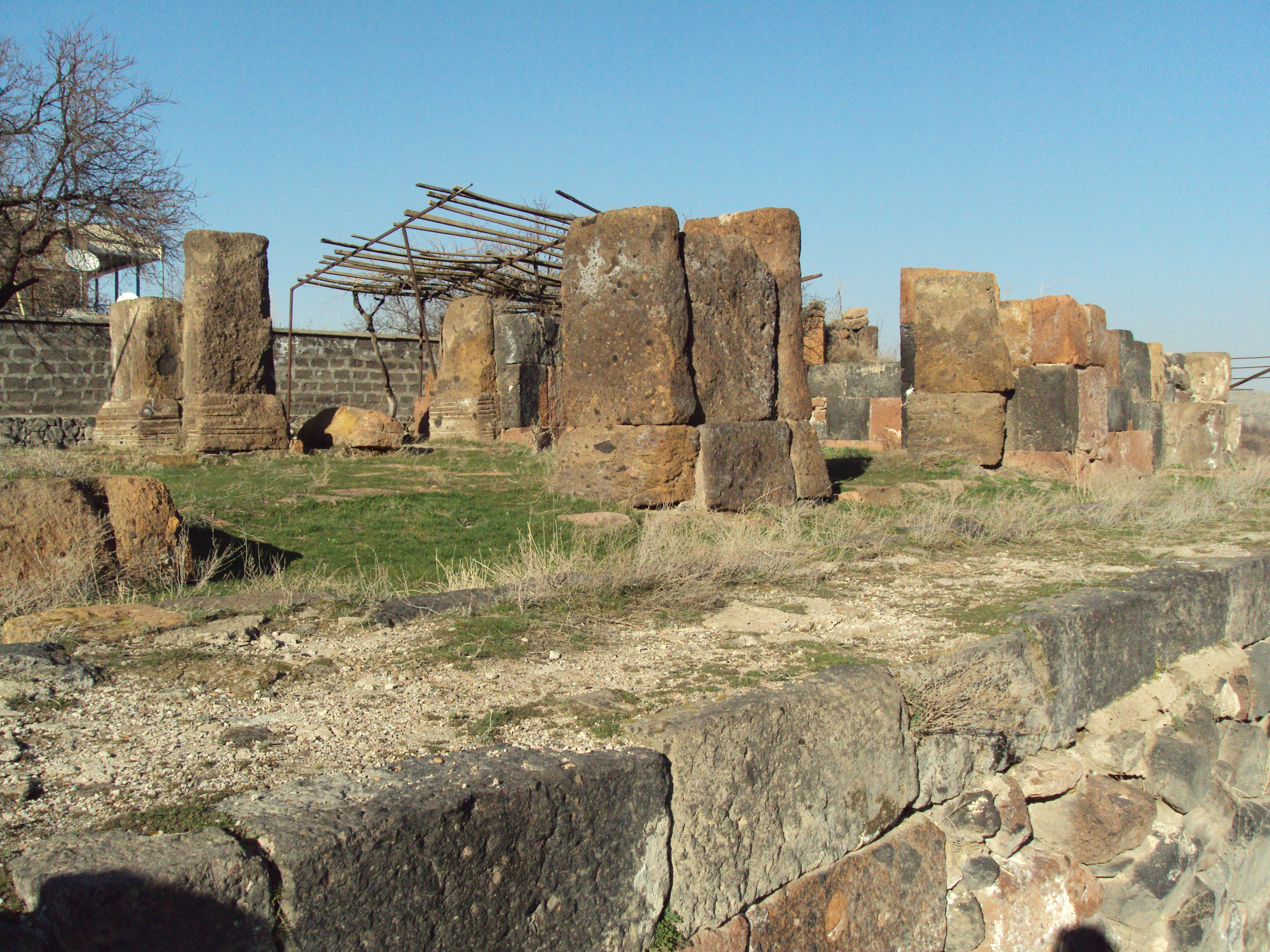
Church ruins (7c.)

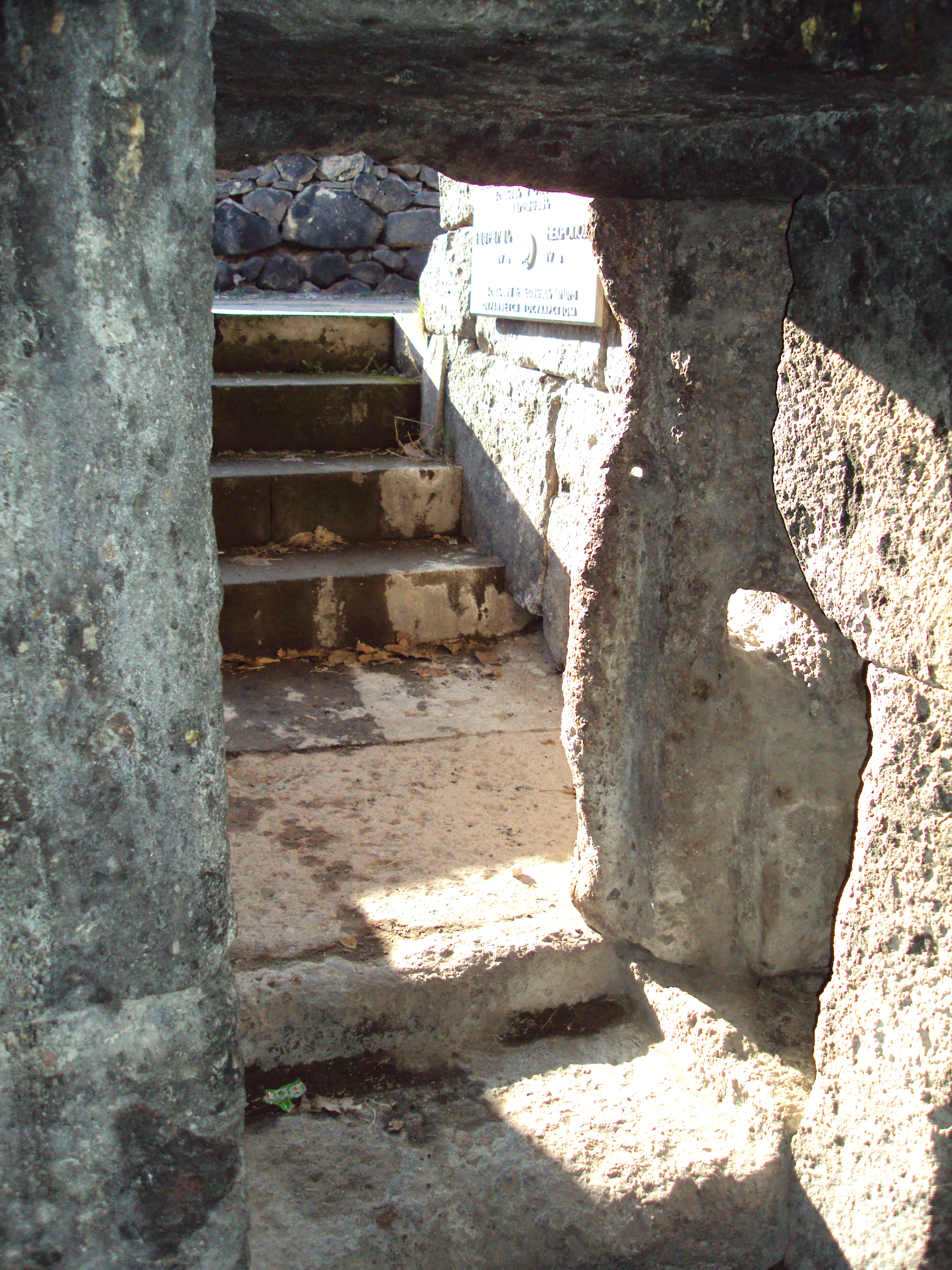
Entrance stairs

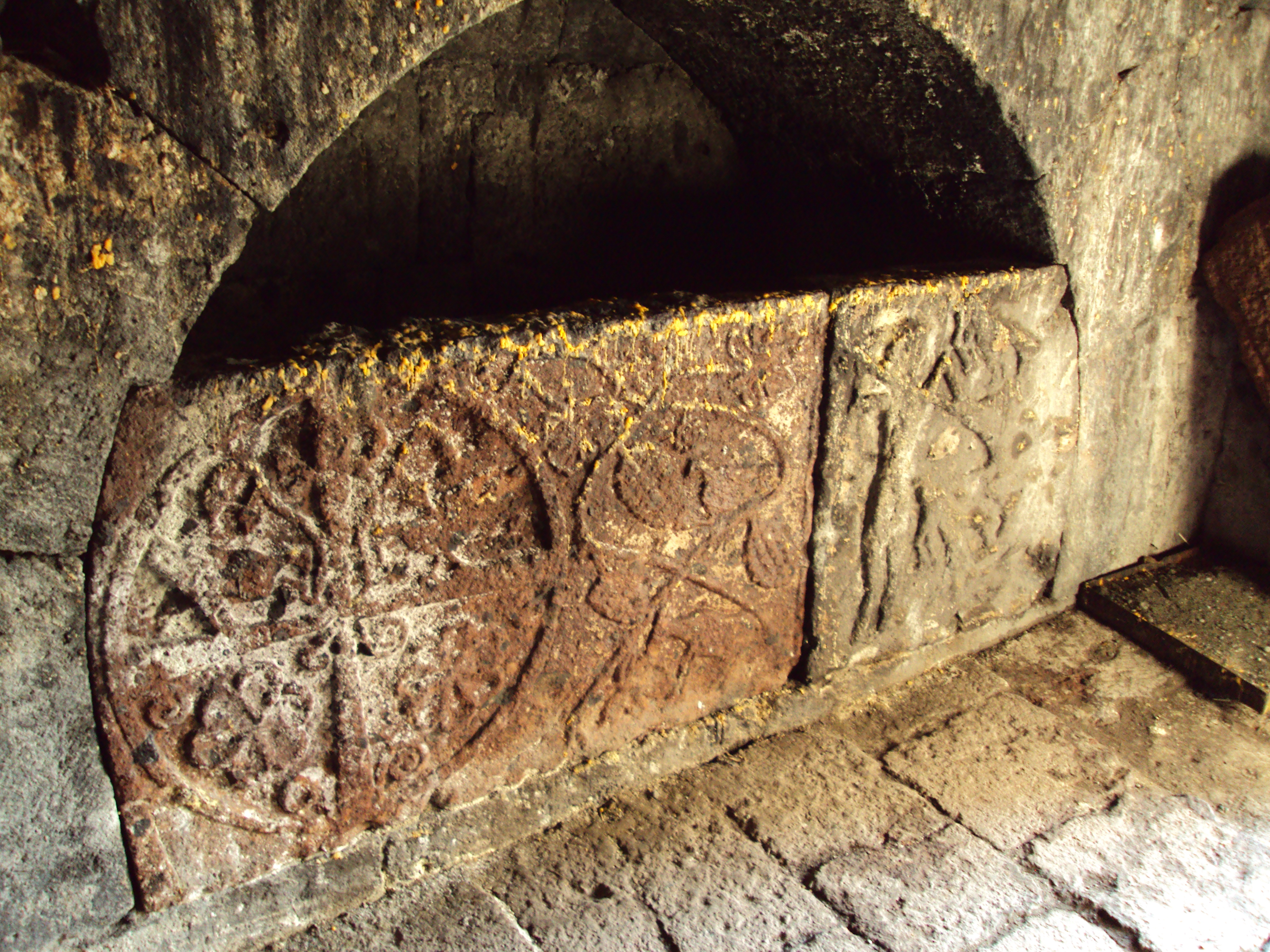
Right niche

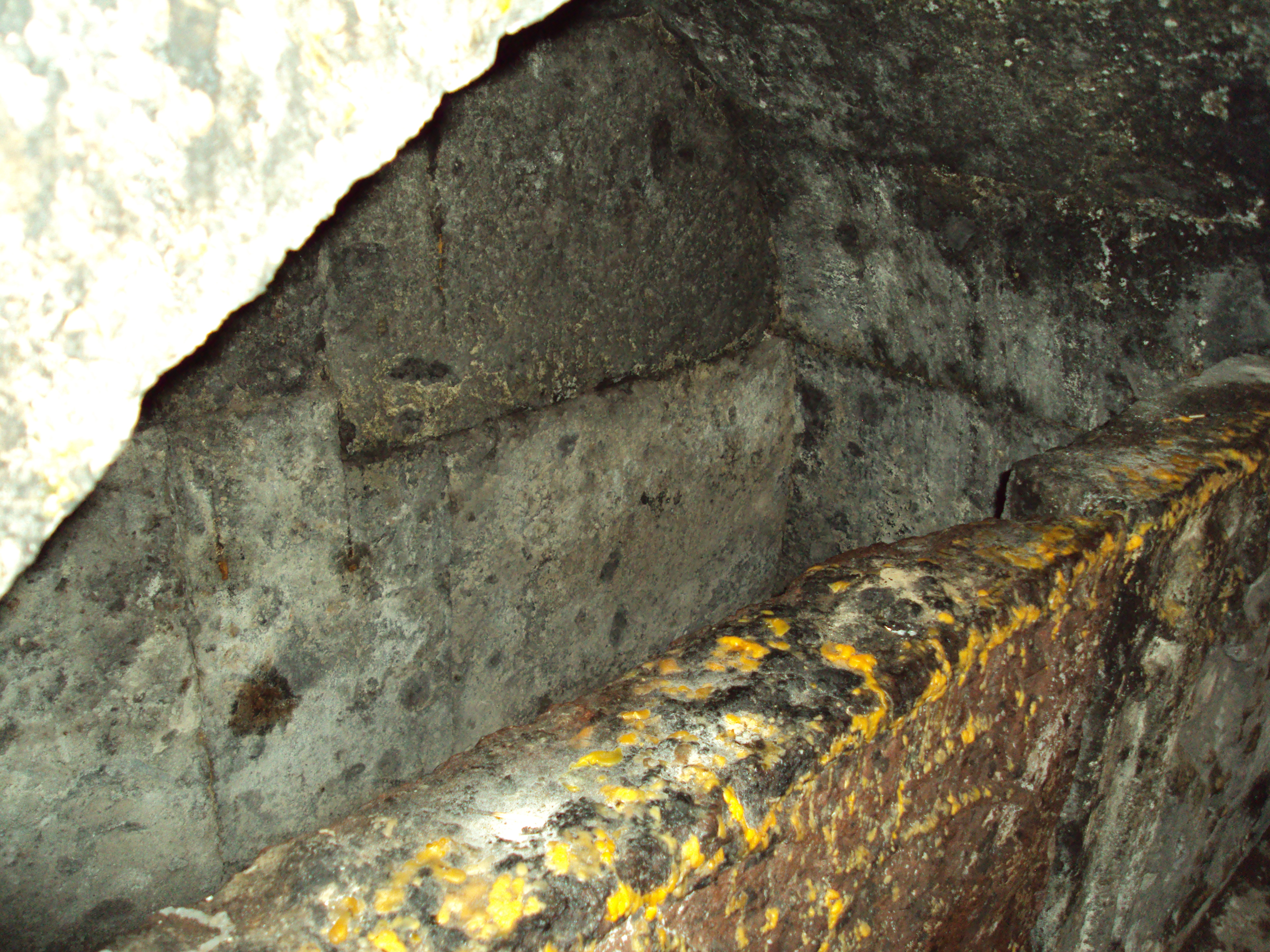
Left niche
