= Vologases II of Parthia =

1st century AD Parthian prince

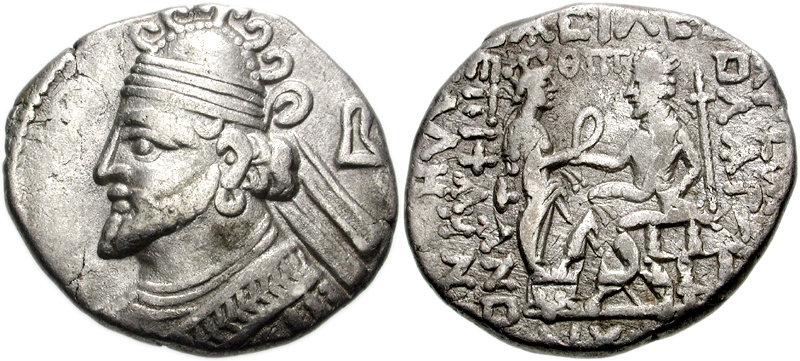
Coin of Vologases II, Seleucia mint

Vologases II was a Parthian prince who competed against his brother Pacorus II (r. 78–110) for the Parthian crown from 78, until his defeat in 80.

== Sources ==
- Chaumont, M. L.; Schippmann, K. (1988). "Balāš". Encyclopaedia Iranica, Vol. III, Fasc. 6. pp. 574–580.
- Dąbrowa, Edward (2007). "The Parthian Kingship": 123–134.

Vologases II of Parthia Arsacid dynasty
Preceded by Pacorus II	King of the Parthian Empire; 78–80	Succeeded by Pacorus II
