= Princess Sandukht =

Armenian princess and Christian martyr

Princess Sandukht (Armenian: Սանդուխտ) also Sandoukht or Saint Santoukhd was recorded as the first Armenian woman to embrace Christianity. Her father was King Sanatruk.

St. Thaddeus, St. Sandukht and other Christians in Sanatruk's prison

== Life ==
King Sanatruk of Armenia discovered that his daughter had converted to Christianity, and he pleaded with her to renounce her newfound faith and return to her native religion. However, his efforts were unsuccessful, and the angry king proceeded to imprison both his daughter, the virgin Sandoukht, and Saint Thaddeus, subjecting them to harsh tortures. The governor of the royal palace, an Armenian prince, also attempted to persuade Sandoukht to abandon Christianity, but instead, he too converted to the faith. Finally, unable to tolerate the situation any longer, the king ordered the execution of both Saint Thaddeus and his own daughter Sandoukht, who were martyred in Shavarshan, the summer residence of the Armenian royal family.

According to one version of the story, at the moment when a soldier plunged his sword into the heart of the holy virgin, a pleasant scent wafted through the air, and a bright light in the shape of a fiery pillar appeared in the sky, hovering over Santoukhd's body for three days and nights. Over 2,000 individuals who witnessed this miraculous event reportedly converted to Christianity and were baptized that very night. Saint Thaddeus buried Santoukhd's body at the same location. He was executed eight days later.
