= Arshakid Mausoleum =

Grave monument complex in Armenia

Arshakid Mausoleum Արշակունիների դամբարան
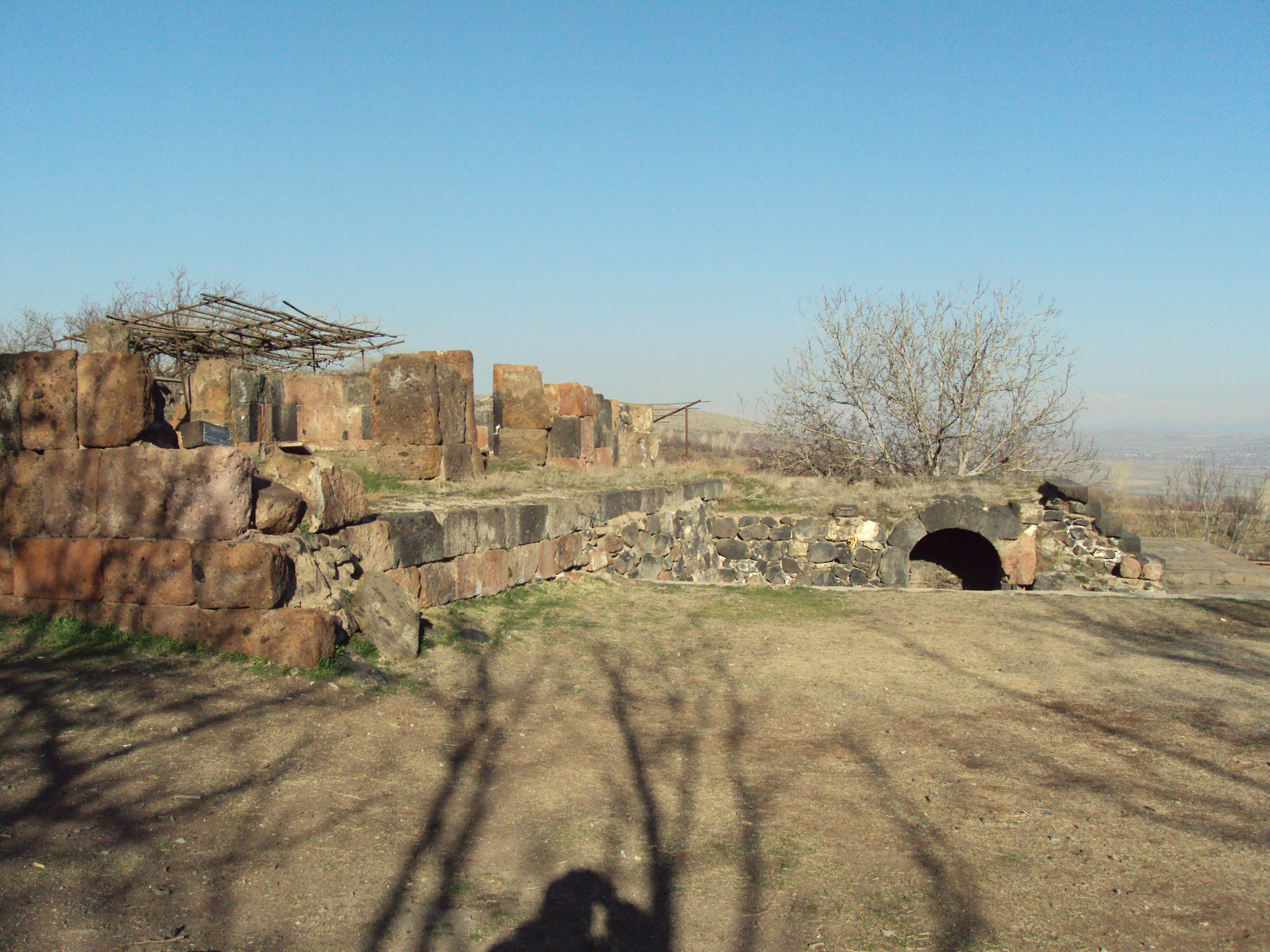
- Arshakid Mausoleum (right) and basilica (left)

- Location within Armenia Location within Aragatsotn

Religion
- Affiliation: Armenian Apostolic Church
- Status: Ruins

Location
- Location: Aghtsk, Aragatsotn Province, Armenia
- Coordinates: 40.3125°N 44.2561°E

Architecture
- Type: Mausoleum: Small-cruciform plan; Church: Basilica type plan
- Style: Armenian
- Completed: Mausoleum: Mid-late 4th century; Basilica: Late 4th or early 5th century

The Arshakid Kings Mausoleum and Basilica (Armenian: Արշակունիների դամբարան; also Tomb of the Arshakid Kings or Arshakuni Tomb) is a grave monument complex that sits along a gorge overlooking the Amberd River, and is located in the center of the village of Aghtsk in the Aragatsotn Province of Armenia. It is best known for the mausoleum that once contained the remains of both Christian and pagan kings of the Arshakid dynasty of Armenia. Approximately one hundred meters north of the basilica and tomb complex is a shrine that sits alongside a path leading down to the gorge below, where there are many caves that date from the 16th-18th centuries. Some of the caves have doors and were used during these periods as refuge from invasions.

== History ==
According to the Epic Histories written by the 5th-century historian Pavstos Buzand (also known as Faustus of Byzantium), he accounts that King Shapur II the Great of Persia after having recaptured Armenia and occupying Ani-Kamakh, discovered there the treasures and tombs of the Armenian Arshakuni Kings. He ordered his troops to exhume the royal remains and in doing so, destroyed the Arshakuni ancestral tombs that were at Ani-Kamakh. There was however the tomb of King Sanatruk that escaped this looting and destruction due to its enormous, impenetrable and ingeniously built structure.

The loot and exhumed remains of the other kings were then carried off en route to Persia with the belief that the land in which the kings' bones were interred would gain their fame, fortune and strength. King Shapur II wanted to reduce the morale of the Armenians as well. The Armenian Sparapet Vassak Mamikonian during the mid-4th century gathered together approximately 60,000 troops and defeated the Persians in the district of Ayrarat, recapturing the treasures and bones of the Armenian kings. He brought the royal remains to Dzorap (modern day Aghtsk) where he soon had them reinterred at a newly constructed mausoleum, separating Christian kings from the pagan kings.

A church was constructed adjacent to the site in the late 4th - early 5th centuries, and the tombs at Dzorap continued to be used through the early 5th century until the Arsacid dynasty came to an end. According to the historian Movses Khorenatsi in his History of Armenia, that after subsequent earthquakes and invasions at Dzorap, a decision was made to move the royal remains once again to a final safer location at Vagharshapat (also known as Echmiadzin) in Armenia.

The following passage describes the event in an excerpt from the 5th-century Epic Histories (Buzandaran Patmutiwnk):

"... They came and besieged the secure fortress of Angegh (which is in the Angeghtun district), for at [that place] were the mausoleums of many of the Armenian Arsacid kings, and many treasures had been stored and kept there from [our] ancestors, [g149] from ancient times on. So, [the Persians] went and besieged that fortress. But when they were unable to take it because of the security of the place, they departed. They passed by many fortresses because they were unable to fight with the strongholds. However, the secure fortress of Ani in the Daranaghi district was betrayed [156] into their hands, because the malefactor Meruzhan devised a stratagem against this secure fortress. [The Persians] climbed up, destroyed the walls, and had countless treasures lowered down from the fortress. They opened the tombs of the first kings of the Armenians, of the Arsacid braves, and took the bones of the kings into captivity. However, they were unable to open only the tomb of King Sanatruk because of its colossal, gigantic firm construction. So they left that place and went on elsewhere raiding, advancing through the Basen areas seeking to come up behind the troops of the king of Armenia.

While all this was taking place, the bad news reached King Arshak. They said to him: "Behold, while you were sitting in Atrpatakan expecting the enemy to come forth, they passed through the side, destroyed the land, and now are coming against you." When King Arshak of Armenia and his general, Vassak, heard this they reviewed their troops. At that time under general Vassak's disposition were some 60,000 select and martial men who were united in war with one mind and one heart to go and fight for their sons and wives, to give their lives for the land and for the districts of the land they inhabited, to fight for their church, for the oath of worship of their blessed churches, for the oath of faith in the [157] name of their God, and for their native Arsacid lords. For many people and even the bones of the dead kings had been seized from their own places and transferred to a foreign land.

The Sparapet Vassak with 60,000 troops advanced, turning about, [g150] leaving King Arshak in a secure spot somewhere in the Marac' country with attendants. Then [Vassak] himself came and reached the interior of Armenia, the district of Ayrarat. He found the Persian troops which had encamped en masse in the district of Ayrarat, resembling the sand on the seashore. Vassak and the brigade with him fell upon the army of the Persian king suddenly, at night. And they put all of the Persian troops to the sword. Only the King [Shapur II] was able to escape by a hairsbreadth and flee. [The Armenians] pursued the survivors and chased them beyond their borders, and retrieved from them much, countless loot, an inestimable amount. They put all [of the Persians] to the sword and retrieved from them the bones of their kings which the Persians were taking into captivity to the land of Persia. For they, in accordance with their pagan faith said: "We are taking the bones of the Armenian kings to our land so that the glory, fortune and bravery of the kings of this land will come to our land with the kings' bones". Vassak retrieved all [158] that had been captured from the land of Armenia. The bones of the Armenian kings which Vassak retrieved, they buried at the stronghold in the village called Aghtsk, in the Ayrarat district, which is located in one of the narrow crevices of the great Aragats mountain, [in a place] difficult to access..."

== Architecture ==
=== Mausoleum ===
The mausoleum that had once contained the bones of the Ashakid kings was constructed in the mid-late 4th century. The low-vaulted chamber is semi-cruciform in plan, with rectangular ossuary niches centered within the structure to the north and south where the royal remains had been placed. Above each niche is an open arch, and in front of the small hall at the eastern end of the tomb is a semi-circular apse. Only a small amount of light peers into the tomb from the outside through the single portal at the western end. Just beyond the door leading outside is a small porch with stone steps that lead up to the ground level. Some exterior bas relief decoration of hunting scenes may still be faintly seen around the portal upon the half-rounded lintel and columns. Most of the carvings have been obliterated over the years. At the time that it was constructed, the structure was two stories tall (the lower chamber having been built below ground) but now only the lower chamber remains.

Each ossuary box is made of stone and is decorated with bas relief depicting two separate scenes. On one (north), the Biblical story of Daniel in the lions' den and a motif of rams is depicted while on the other (south) there are depictions of a mythical hero alongside astrological imagery of birds, a calf amid a grape vine, a cross within a circle with two birds perched on top and a hunter with two dogs striking a wild boar. According to legend, the ossuary that had the Biblical relief held the bones of the Christian kings while that with the relief of the mythical hero held the bones of the pagan kings.

=== Basilica ===
A late-4th to early-5th-century basilica sits adjoined to the north end of the mausoleum. It was constructed with a central nave with four columns that separated it from the aisles to either side. Directly in front of the nave was a semi-circular apse with a single study or “prayer room” to the side. Only the lower walls remain standing today along with some of the larger stones, some of which have relief carved into their surfaces. During the 19th century the church was partially reconstructed.

== Gallery ==
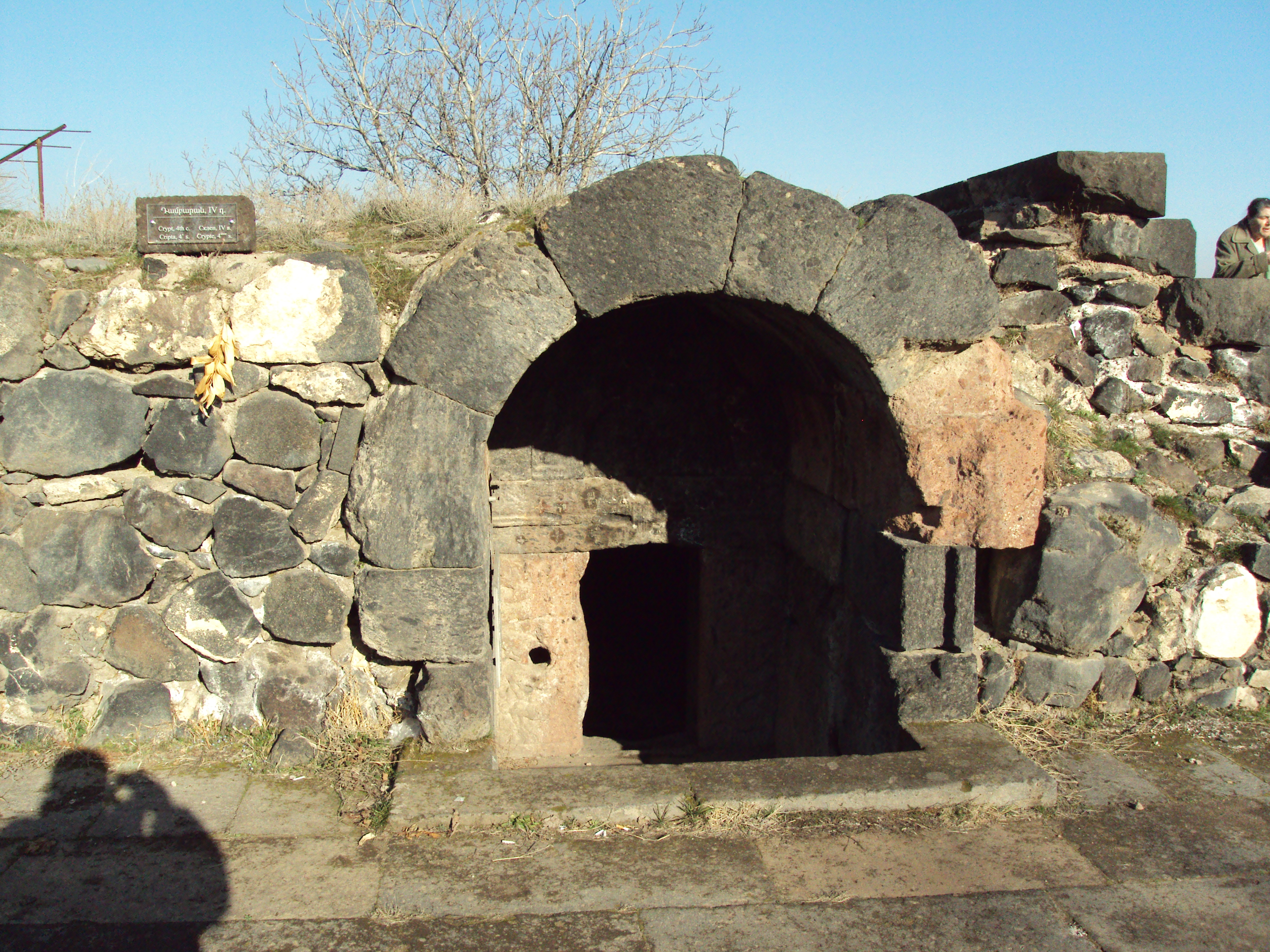
Entrance

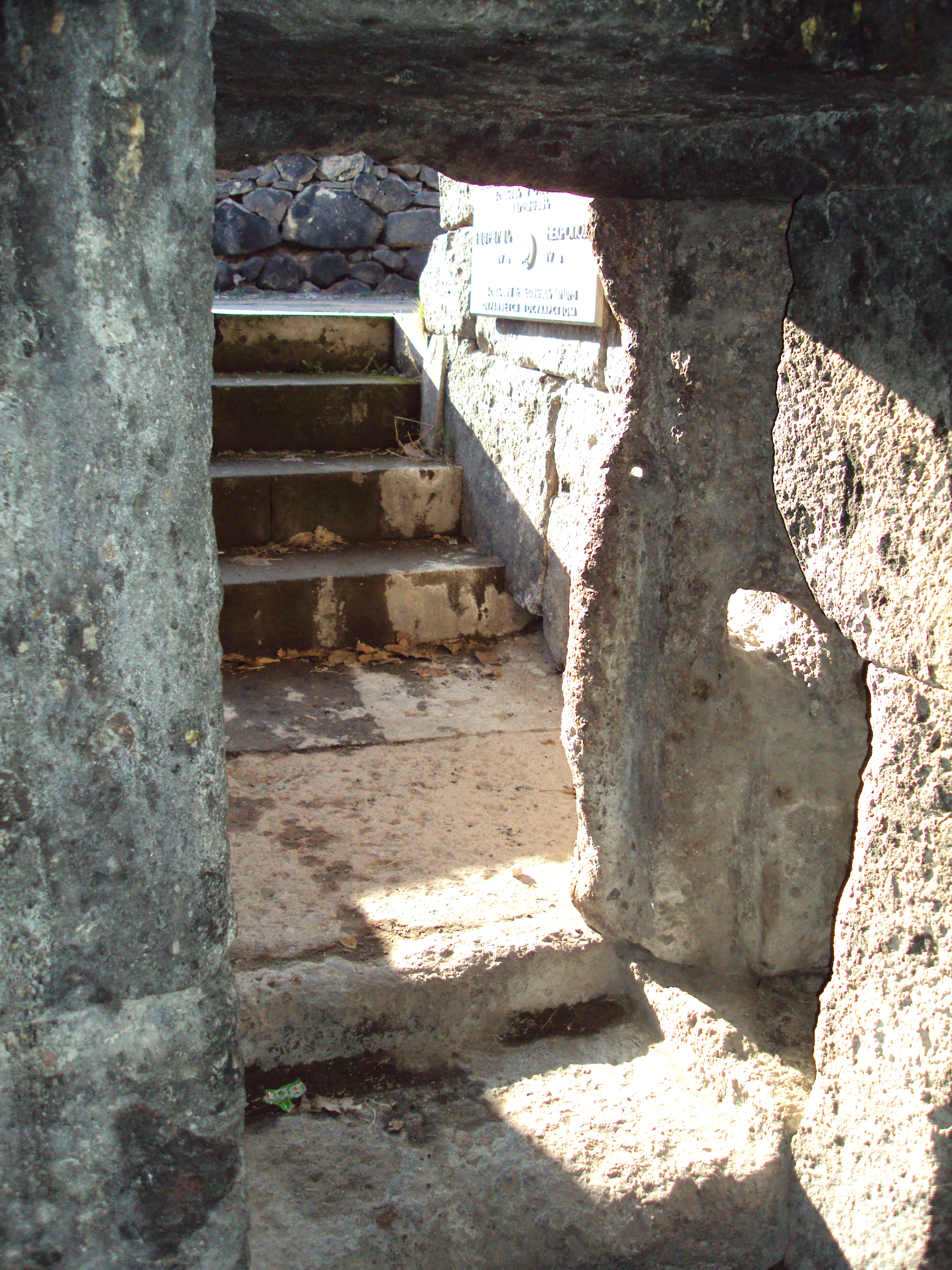
Entrance stairs

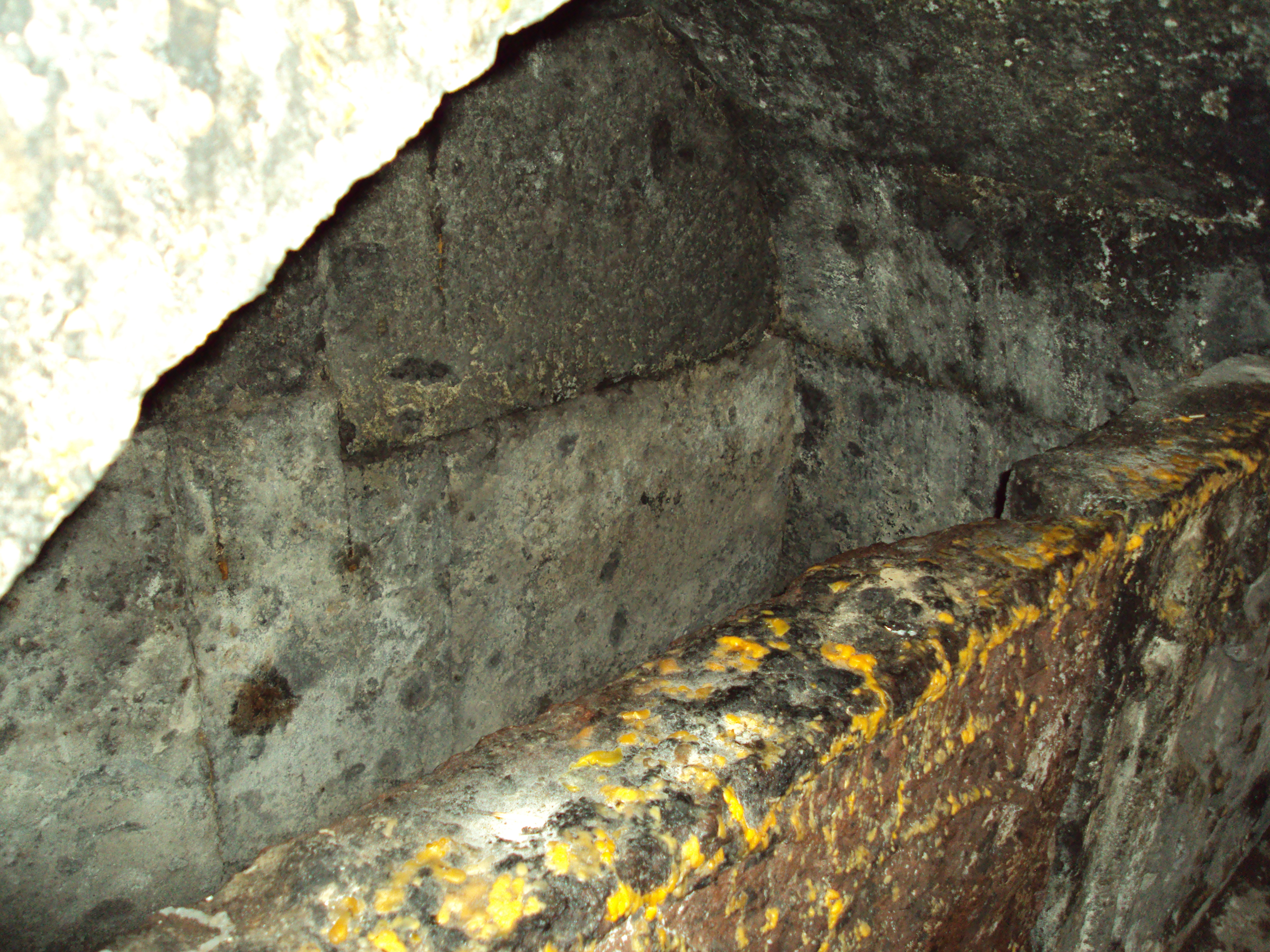
Tomb

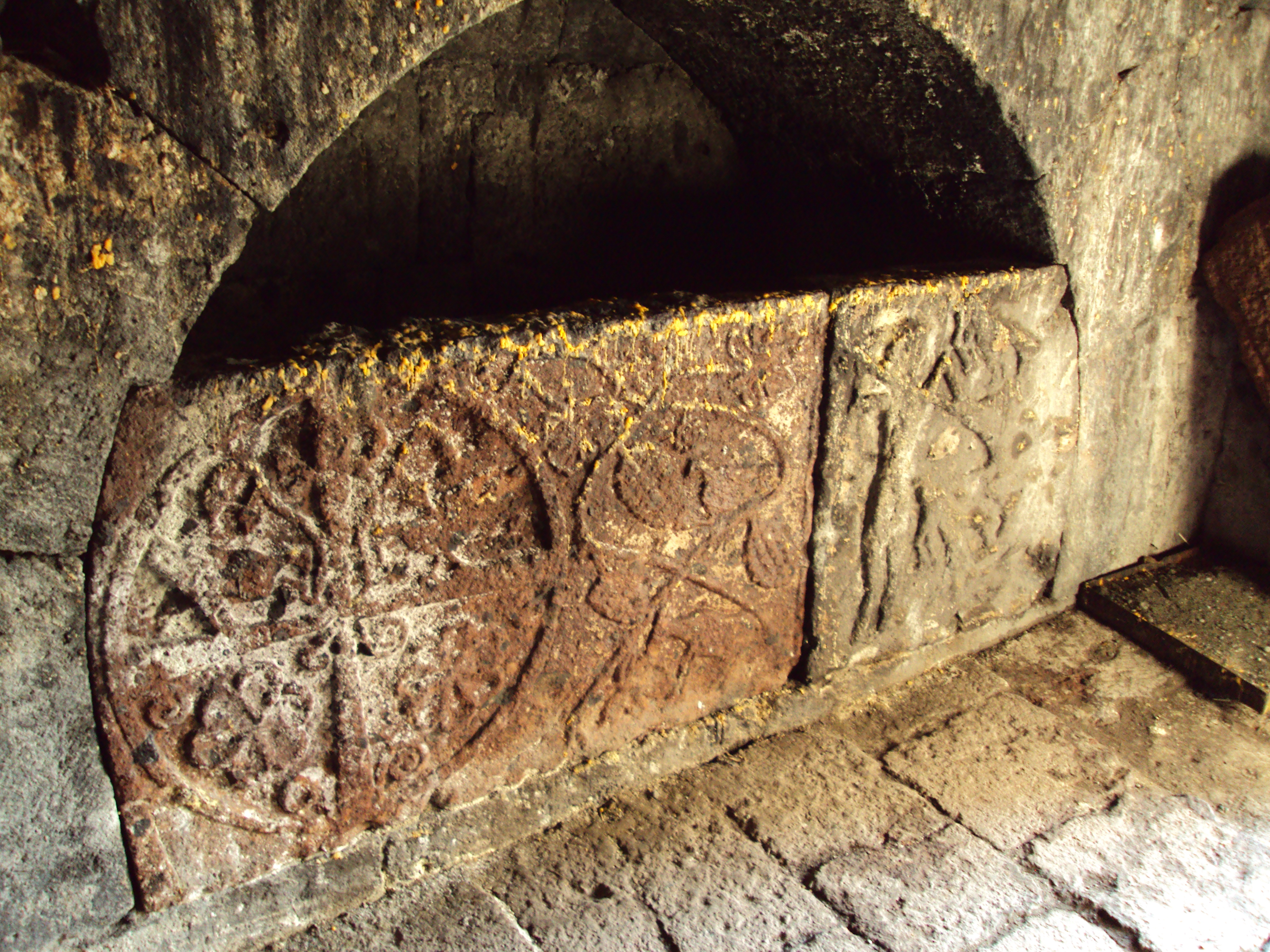
Tomb façade detail
