= Parthamasiris of Armenia =

King of Armenia from 113 to 114

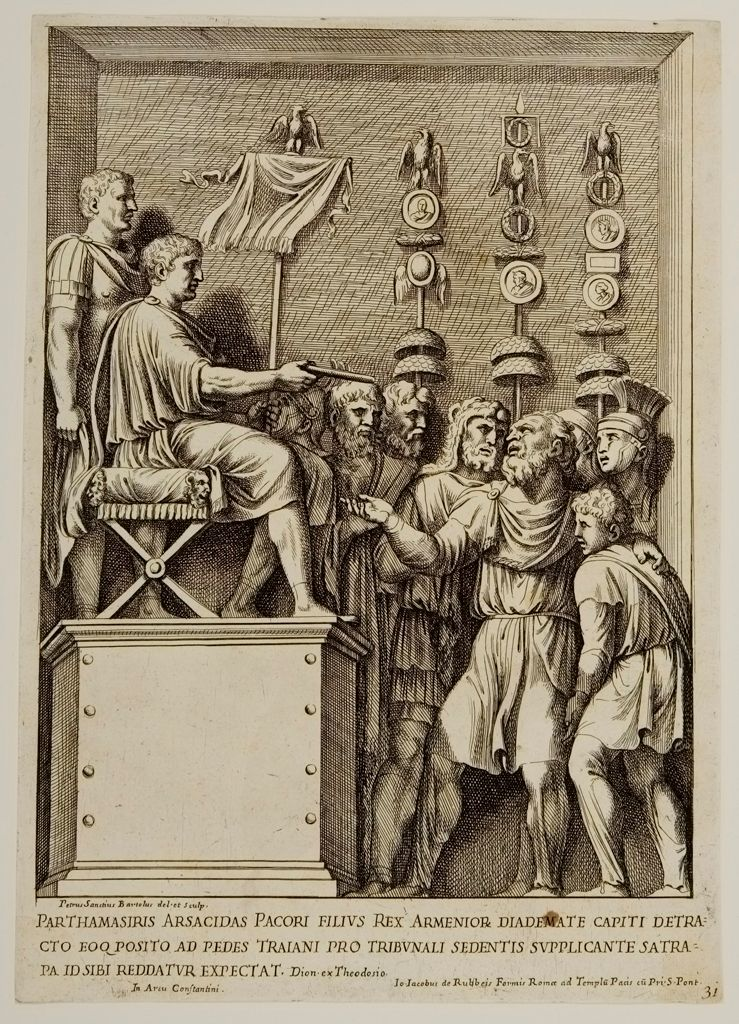
- Parthamasiris, King of Armenia, Son of Pacorus, Humbles Himself before Trajan

King of Armenia
- Reign: 113–114 AD
- Predecessor: Axidares
- Successor: Vologases I of Armenia
- Died: 114
- House: Arsacid
- Father: Pacorus II

Parthamasiris, also known as Partamasir or Parthomasiris (flourished second half of the 1st century and first half of the 2nd century, died 114) was a Parthian prince who served as a Roman client king of Armenia.

== Biography ==
Parthamasiris was one of the three sons born to King Pacorus II of Parthia by a mother whose name is unknown. Through his father he was a member of the House of Parthia thus a relation of the Arsacid dynasty of Armenia. Little is known of his life prior to becoming Armenian king.

== Reign ==
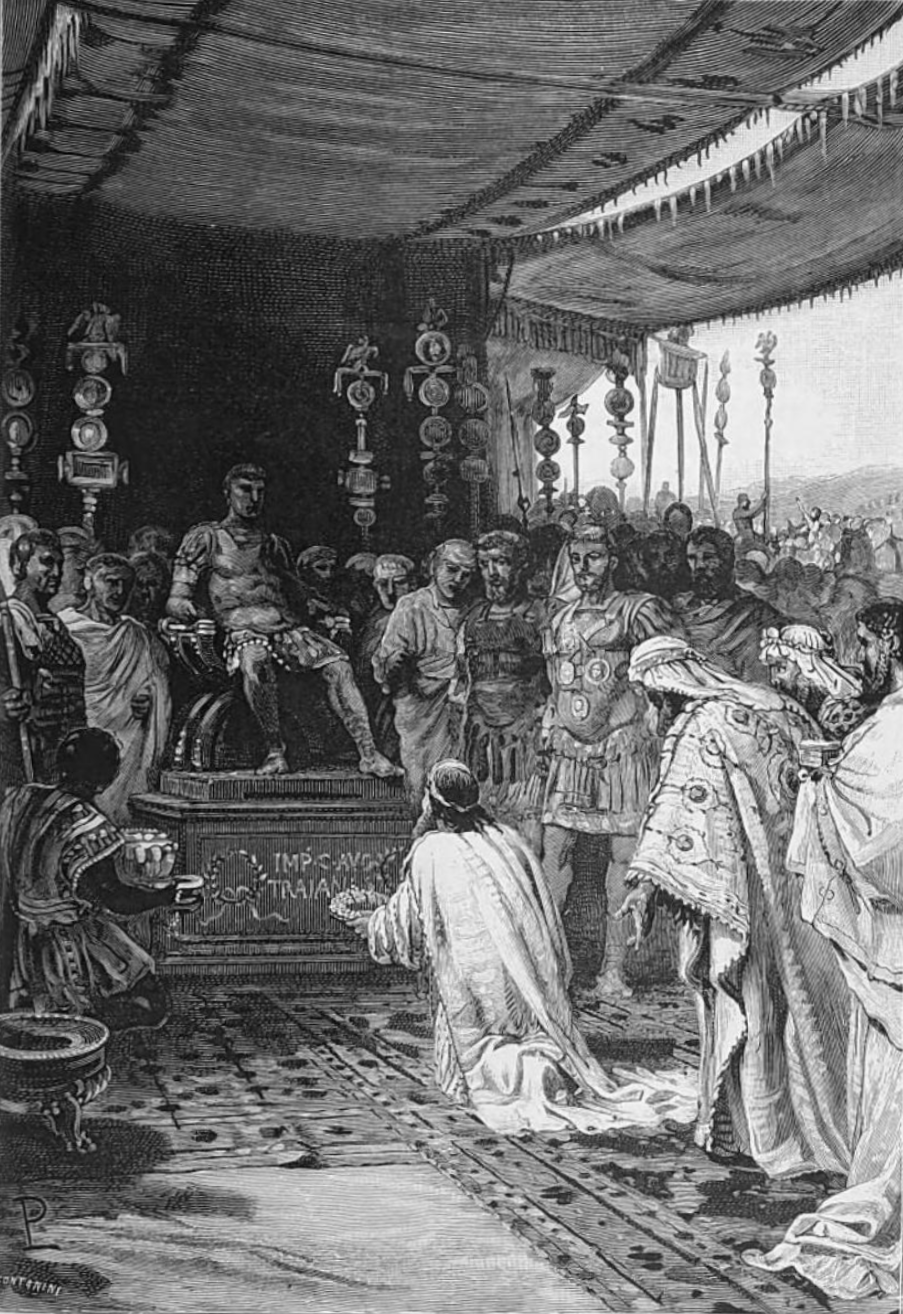
Parthamasiris placing the crown before Trajan (Lodovico Pogliaghi, 114)

In 113, Parthamasiris’ paternal uncle Osroes I of Parthia deposed his brother Axidares from the Armenian kingship and installed him as king to avoid to going to war with the Roman emperor Trajan and keep peace with him. Axidares was placed on the Armenian throne by his paternal uncle without Roman consultation which led to Trajan to view the action by Osroes I as an invitation to war with Parthia.

In 114, the Roman army invaded Armenia from Satala and advanced toward Artaxata. Unable to organize an effective resistance, Parthamasiris appeared before Trajan. In a symbolic gesture, Parthamasiris removed his crown and placed it at the Emperor's feet, expecting to have it restored to him. After rejecting Parthamasiris’ request, Trajan annexed Armenia as a Roman province.

Trajan sent Parthamasiris from Armenia back home to Parthia and continued on with his Parthian military campaign. On his way home to Parthia, Parthamasiris disappeared; historians have asserted that Trajan had ordered Parthamasiris's murder.

== Coins ==
No coinage bearing the image of Parthamasiris was minted in Armenia; however, his likeness was captured on several Roman imperial issues. In Roman numismatics, Parthamasiris is frequently depicted alongside the Emperor Trajan to emphasize the latter's supremacy. The first series of these coins illustrates the encounter between Trajan and Parthamasiris: the Emperor is represented in a triumphant and dominant posture upon a raised tribunal, while Parthamasiris is positioned below him. This iconography was intended to symbolize Roman dominion, Trajan's military might, and the Emperor's administrative control over the region.

== Sources ==
- M. Bunson, A Dictionary of the Roman Empire, Oxford University Press, 1995
- K. Farrokh, Shadows in the Desert: Ancient Persia at War, Osprey Publishing, 2007
- T. Mommsen, W. Purdie Dickson & F. Haverfield, The provinces of the Roman Empire: from Caesar to Domitian, Gorgias Press LLC, 2004
- D.T. Potts, Araby the Blest: Studies in Arabian Archaeology, Museum Tusculanum Press, 1988
- Yarshater, The Cambridge History of Iran, Volume 3, Cambridge University Press, 1993
- Arnold, Thomas, History of the Later Roman Commonwealth, from the End of the Second Punic War to the Death of Julius Caesar; and of the Reign of Augustus: with a Life of Trajan, 1846
- Mesrop, Gēorg, History of Armenia: A Critical Study, 1913
- Bowman, Alan K., Garnsey, Peter, Rathbone, Dominic, The Cambridge Ancient History, Cambridge University Press, 1982

Parthamasiris of Armenia Arsacid dynasty of Armenia Born: - Died: 114
Preceded by Axidares (110-113)	Parthamasiris; 113-114	Succeeded by Vologases I (99-140)
