= Treaty of Rhandeia =

Peace treaty between the Roman and Parthian Empires (AD 63)

The Treaty of Rhandeia was a peace treaty concluded between the Roman Empire and the Parthian Empire at the frontier town of Rhandeia in what is now Turkey in 63 CE. The treaty, which finalized the Roman–Parthian War of 58–63, stipulated that henceforth a Parthian prince of the Arsacid line would sit on the Armenian throne, but his nomination, or right of investiture, was given to the emperor of Rome. According to some, this treaty transferred Armenia to the Romans, while others believe that Nero ceded Armenia to the Parthians. This compromise between Parthia and Rome lasted for several decades, until 114 CE, when Rome under Trajan broke the peace by invading Armenia and subsequently Parthia itself, taking direct control of Arsacid Armenia and incorporating it into a short-lived Roman province which lasted for a mere four years before it was outwardly relinquished under Trajan's successor Hadrian in 118 CE.

The Arsacid dynasty would nevertheless maintain the Armenian throne, albeit most often as client kings, until 428 CE, when the kingdom was partitioned by the Eastern Roman and Sasanian empires, and the eastern part of Armenia became a Sasanian province from then on ruled by a marzban.

== Sources ==
- Bang, Peter Fibiger; Scheidel, Walter, eds. (2013). The Oxford Handbook of the State in the Ancient Near East and Mediterranean. OUP USA. p. 204. ISBN 978-0195188318.
- Clark, Timothy (2021). "Processing into Dominance: Nero, the Crowning of Tiridates I, and a New Narrative of Rome's Supremacy in the East". Journal of Ancient History. 9 (2): 269–296. doi:10.1515/jah-2020-0030. S2CID 240075265.
- Gagarin, Michael, ed. (2009). The Oxford Encyclopedia of Ancient Greece and Rome (Vol. 1). Oxford: Oxford University Press. ISBN 978-0195170726.
- Mikaberidze, Alexander (2015). Historical Dictionary of Georgia (2 ed.). Rowman & Littlefield. ISBN 978-1442241466.
- Foot, Sarah; Robinson, Chase F., eds. (2012). The Oxford History of Historical Writing: Volume 2: 400-1400. Oxford: OUP Oxford. ISBN 978-0199236428.
- Redgate, Anne Elizabeth (2000). The Armenians (First ed.). Massachusetts: Blackwell Publishers Inc. pp. 88–91. ISBN 978-0631220374.
- Wiesehofer, Josef (2011). Ancient Persia. I.B.Tauris. p. 313. ISBN 978-1860646751.
- Yarshater, Ehsan, ed. (1985). Encyclopaedia Iranica, Volume 2. Routledge & Kegan Paul. p. 424. ISBN 9780710090904.
