= Axidares of Armenia =

King of Armenia from 110 to 113

King of Armenia
- Reign: 110–113
- Predecessor: Sanatruk
- Successor: Parthamasiris
- Died: 113
- House: Arsacid
- Father: Pacorus II

Axidares or Ashkhadar also known as Exedares or Exedates (Armenian: Աշխադար; flourished second half of the 1st century & first half of the 2nd century, died 113) was a Parthian prince who served as a Roman client king of Armenia.

== Enthronement and dethronement ==
Axidares was one of the three sons born to King Pacorus II of Parthia by a mother whose name is unknown. Through his father, he was a member of the House of Parthia thus a relation of the Arsacid dynasty of Armenia. Little is known of his life prior to becoming Armenian king.

He ascended the throne by mutual agreement of Rome and Parthia. The King of Parthia Khosrov I, after the death of Bakur II, failing to reach an agreement with Axidares, deposed Axidares in 113 and instead appointed his brother Parthamaspates. The deposition of Axidares became the cause of a new Roman–Parthian war. Considering this change a violation of the Treaty of Rhandeia, Emperor Trajan, together with Axidares, marched to the East in 114, conquered Parthia, deposed Parthamaspates, and declared Armenia a Roman province. Information about Ashkadar is scarce.

== Sources ==
- D.T. Potts, Araby the Blest: Studies in Arabian Archaeology, Museum Tusculanum Press, 1988
- Yarshater, The Cambridge History of Iran, Volume 3, Cambridge University Press, 1993
- M. Bunson, A Dictionary of the Roman Empire, Oxford University Press, 1995
- T. Mommsen, W. Purdie Dickson & F. Haverfield, The provinces of the Roman Empire: from Caesar to Domitian, Gorgias Press LLC, 2004
- K. Farrokh, Shadows in the Desert: Ancient Persia at War, Osprey Publishing, 2007

Axidares of Armenia Arsacid dynasty of Armenia Born: - Died: 113
Preceded by Sanatruk (-109)	Axidares; 110-113	Succeeded by Parthamasiris (113-114)
