= Pacorus II =

King of Kings of the Parthian Empire (ruled 78-110)

Pacorus II 𐭐𐭊𐭅𐭓
- King of Kings
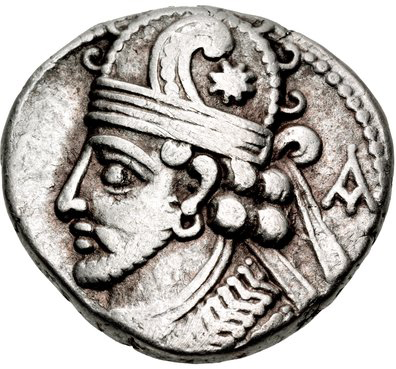
- Tetradrachm of Pacorus II wearing a tiara, minted at Seleucia in 92/3

King of the Parthian Empire
- Reign: 78 – 110
- Predecessor: Vologases I (predecessor); Vologases II (rival king); Artabanus III (rival king)
- Successor: Vologases III (successor); Osroes I (rival king)
- Born: c. 61/2
- Died: 110 (aged 48 or 49)
- Issue: Vologases III; Axidares; Parthamasiris; Meredates
- Dynasty: Arsacid dynasty
- Father: Vologases I
- Religion: Zoroastrianism

Pacorus II (also spelled Pakoros II; 𐭐𐭊𐭅𐭓) was the King of Kings of the Parthian Empire from 78 to 110. He was the son and successor of Vologases I (r. 51–78).

During the latter part of his father's reign, Pacorus ruled the Parthian Empire along with him. After Vologases I's death in 78, Pacorus became the sole ruler, but was quickly met by a revolt by his brother Vologases II, which lasted until the latter's defeat in 80. In 79/80, Pacorus' rule was contended by another Parthian prince—Artabanus III—whom he had defeated by 81. A third Parthian contender, Osroes I, appeared in 109. The following year, Pacorus was succeeded by his son Vologases III, who continued his father's struggle with Osroes I over the Parthian crown.

Like his father, Pacorus continued the same policies of the prominent former Parthian king Artabanus II (r. 12–38/41), which included increasing the economic sources of the Parthian Empire by establishing a new trade system and strengthening relations with other powers, such as Han China. Parthian interest also continued to grow in eastern lands of Khwarazm, Bactria, and the Hindu Kush. The influence of the Parthians is demonstrated by the presence of Parthian features in the coinage of numerous political entities in those areas.

Under Pacorus, the usage of the image of the Greek goddess Tyche on the reverse of Parthian coins became more regular than that of the seated king with a bow, specifically on the coin minted at Ecbatana. Tyche was either a representation of the Iranian goddesses Anahita or Ashi.

== Name ==
The name Pacorus is the Latin form of the Greek Pakoros (Πακώρος), itself a variant of the Middle Iranian Pakur, derived from Old Iranian bag-puhr ('son of a god'). The Armenian and Georgian transliteration is Bakur (respectively; Բակուր, ბაკური).

Pacorus II's name is recorded in the bilingual inscription on the famous bronze statue of Heracles in Seleucia as Greek Pakhorou (Παχόρου, genitive) and Parthian pkwr (𐭐𐭊𐭅𐭓 'Pakur').

== Background ==
Pacorus was one of the younger sons of the Parthian king Vologases I (r. 51–78), being born in c. 61/2. Under Vologases I, the empire experienced a resurgence. During the last years of his reign, Pacorus ruled alongside him. After Vologases I's death in 78, Pacorus became the sole ruler of the empire.

== Reign ==
Pacorus was soon met by a revolt by his brother Vologases II, which lasted until the latter's defeat in 80. In 79/80, Pacorus' rule was contended by another Parthian prince—Artabanus III, who seemed to have little support in the empire, with the exception of Babylonia. Artabanus III's most notable action was to give refuge to a Pseudo-Nero named Terentius Maximus. Artabanus III initially agreed to lend military aid to Terentius Maximus to capture Rome, until he found about the real identity of the impostor. Coin mints of Artabanus III disappear after 81, which suggests that by this year Pacorus had defeated him.

Like his father, Pacorus sought to accomplish the goal of Artabanus II (r. 12–38/41), by attempting to establish a long and structured trade-route that spanned through East Asia, India and the coast of the Mediterranean Sea. This planned long trade-route would greatly improve the economy of the Parthian Empire. In order to accomplish this, Pacorus strengthened relations with other powers whom he was able to establish long distance trade with, most notably Han China. In 97, the Chinese general Ban Chao, the Protector-General of the Western Regions, sent his emissary Gan Ying on a diplomatic mission to reach the Roman Empire. Gan visited the court of Pacorus at Hecatompylos before departing towards Rome. He traveled as far west as the Persian Gulf, where the Parthian authorities convinced him that an arduous sea voyage around the Arabian Peninsula was the only means to reach Rome. Discouraged by this, Gan Ying returned to the Han court and provided Emperor He of Han (r. 88–105) with a detailed report on the Roman Empire based on oral accounts of his Parthian hosts. The modern historian William Watson speculated that the Parthians would have been relieved at the failed efforts by the Han Empire to open diplomatic relations with Rome, especially after Ban Chao's military victories against the Xiongnu in eastern Central Asia.

Parthian interest also continued to grow in eastern lands of Khwarazm, Bactria, and the Hindu Kush. The influence of the Parthian Empire is demonstrated by the existence of Parthian aspects in the coinage of numerous political entities in those areas. During his last years of rule, Pacorus co-ruled with his son Vologases III. In 109, a third Parthian contender named Osroes I appeared. In 110, Pacorus sold the Arsacid vassal kingdom of Osroene to Abgar VII. Pacorus died in the same year, and was succeeded by Vologases III, who continued his father's struggle with Osroes I over the Arsacid crown.

== Coinage ==
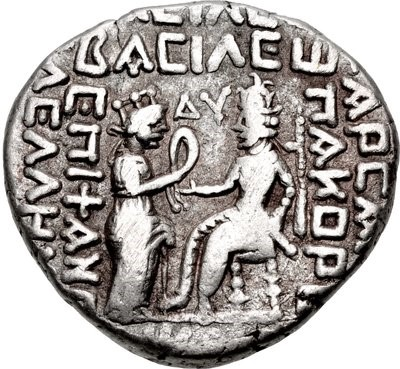
Coin of Pacorus II being invested as king by a goddess, representing either Anahita or Ashi

On the obverse of his coins, Pacorus is portrayed simply wearing a diadem. At first, he appeared beardless on his coins, a rare feature in Parthian coinage that demonstrated his youth, having ascended the throne around the age of sixteen or seventeen. From 82/3, he is depicted with a beard. From 93–96, Pacorus is portrayed with his father's tiara. The modern historian Marek Jan Olbrycht surmises that the wearing of the tiara in the latter part of his reign was reflected the power and status of his empire at this time.

The reverse of his coins portrayed the Greek goddess Tyche investing him as king. Under Pacorus, the usage of the image of Tyche on the reverse of Parthian coins became more regular than that of the seated king with a bow, specifically on the coin minted at Ecbatana. This lasted until the reign of his son and successor, Vologases III. In the Parthian era, Iranians used Hellenistic iconography to portray their divine figures, thus the investiture scene can be associated with the Avestan khvarenah, i.e., kingly glory, with Tyche representing one of the Iranian goddesses Anahita or Ashi.

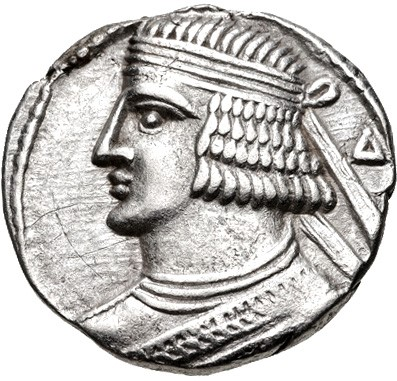
Coin of a young, beardless Pacorus II wearing a diadem, minted in 78/79

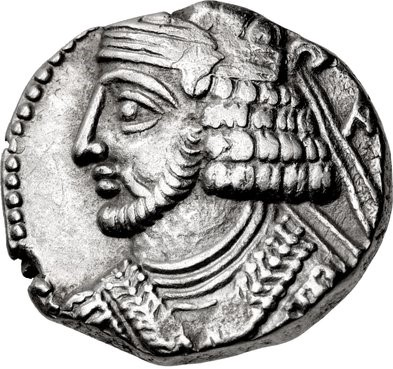
Coin of a bearded Pacorus II wearing a diadem, minted in 92/93

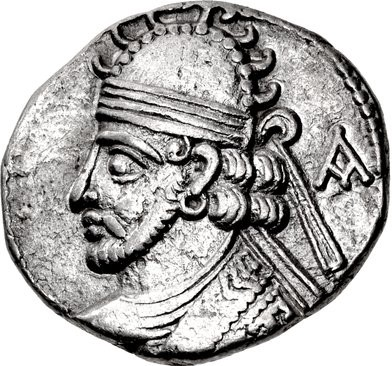
Coin of a bearded Pacorus II wearing a tiara, minted in 93

== Offspring ==
Besides Vologases III, Pacorus had three other sons: Axidares, and Parthamasiris, who successively served as kings of Armenia, and Meredates, who served as king of Characene in the mid-2nd century.

== Sources ==
- Boyce, Mary (1984). Zoroastrians: Their Religious Beliefs and Practices. Psychology Press. pp. 1–252. ISBN 9780415239028.
- Chaumont, M. L. (1986). "Armenia and Iran ii. The pre-Islamic period". Encyclopaedia Iranica, Vol. II, Fasc. 4. pp. 418–438.
- Chaumont, M. L.; Schippmann, K. (1988). "Balāš". Encyclopaedia Iranica, Vol. III, Fasc. 6. pp. 574–580.
- Curtis, Vesta Sarkhosh (2012). "Parthian coins: Kingship and Divine Glory". The Parthian Empire and its Religions. Computus Druck Satz & Verlag. pp. 67–83. ISBN 9783940598134.
- Curtis, Vesta Sarkhosh (2016). "Ancient Iranian Motifs and Zoroastrian Iconography". In Williams, Markus; Stewart, Sarah; Hintze, Almut (eds.). The Zoroastrian Flame Exploring Religion, History and Tradition. I.B. Tauris. pp. 179–203. ISBN 9780857728159.
- Dąbrowa, Edward (2012). "The Arsacid Empire". In Daryaee, Touraj (ed.). The Oxford Handbook of Iranian History. Oxford University Press. pp. 1–432. ISBN 978-0-19-987575-7. Archived from the original on 2019-01-01.
- de Crespigny, Rafe (2007), A Biographical Dictionary of Later Han to the Three Kingdoms (23–220 AD), Leiden: Koninklijke Brill, ISBN 978-90-04-15605-0
- Gregoratti, Leonardo (2013). "Epigraphy of Later Parthia": 276–284. Archived from the original on 2020-07-13.
- Gregoratti, Leonardo (2017). "The Arsacid Empire". In Daryaee, Touraj (ed.). King of the Seven Climes: A History of the Ancient Iranian World (3000 BCE - 651 CE). UCI Jordan Center for Persian Studies. pp. 1–236. ISBN 9780692864401. Archived from the original on 2021-12-06.
- Hollis, A. S. (1994). "Statius' Young Parthian King ('Thebaid' 8.286-93)". Greece & Rome. 41 (2). Cambridge University Press: 205–212. doi:10.1017/S001738350002341X. JSTOR 643014. S2CID 162508739. (registration required)
- Kia, Mehrdad (2016). The Persian Empire: A Historical Encyclopedia. ABC-CLIO. ISBN 978-1610693912. (2 volumes)
- Marciak, Michał (2017). Sophene, Gordyene, and Adiabene: Three Regna Minora of Northern Mesopotamia Between East and West. BRILL. ISBN 9789004350724.
- Morton, William S.; Lewis, Charlton M. (2005), China: Its History and Culture, New York: McGraw-Hill, ISBN 978-0-07-141279-7
- Olbrycht, Marek Jan (1997). "Parthian King's tiara - Numismatic evidence and some aspects of Arsacid political ideology". 2: 27–61.
- Olbrycht, Marek Jan (2016a). "The Sacral Kingship of the early Arsacids I. Fire Cult and Kingly Glory": 91–106.
- Olbrycht, Marek Jan (2016b). "Dynastic Connections in the Arsacid Empire and the Origins of the House of Sāsān". In Curtis, Vesta Sarkhosh; Pendleton, Elizabeth J.; Alram, Michael; Daryaee, Touraj (eds.). The Parthian and Early Sasanian Empires: Adaptation and Expansion. Oxbow Books. ISBN 9781785702082.
- Potter, D. S. (1991). "The Inscriptions on the Bronze Herakles from Mesene: Vologeses IV's War with Rome and the Date of Tacitus' "Annales"". Zeitschrift für Papyrologie und Epigraphik. 88: 277–290. JSTOR 20187558. (registration required)
- Rapp, Stephen H. (2014). The Sasanian World through Georgian Eyes: Caucasia and the Iranian Commonwealth in Late Antique Georgian Literature. Ashgate Publishing, Ltd. ISBN 978-1472425522.
- Rezakhani, Khodadad (2013). "Arsacid, Elymaean, and Persid Coinage". In Potts, Daniel T. (ed.). The Oxford Handbook of Ancient Iran. Oxford University Press. ISBN 978-0199733309.
- Schippmann, K. (1986). "Artabanus (Arsacid kings)". Encyclopaedia Iranica, Vol. II, Fasc. 6. pp. 647–650.
- Sellwood, D. (1983). "Adiabene". Encyclopaedia Iranica, Vol. I, Fasc. 5. pp. 456–459.
- Watson, William (1968). "Iran and China". In Fischer, William B. (ed.). The Cambridge History of Iran. Vol. 3a. Cambridge: Cambridge University Press. pp. 537–558. ISBN 0-521-06935-1.

Pacorus II Arsacid dynasty Died: 110
Preceded by Vologases I (predecessor); Vologases II (rival king); Artabanus III (rival king)	King of the Parthian Empire; 78–110	Succeeded by Vologases III (successor); Osroes I (rival king)
