= List of ancient great powers =

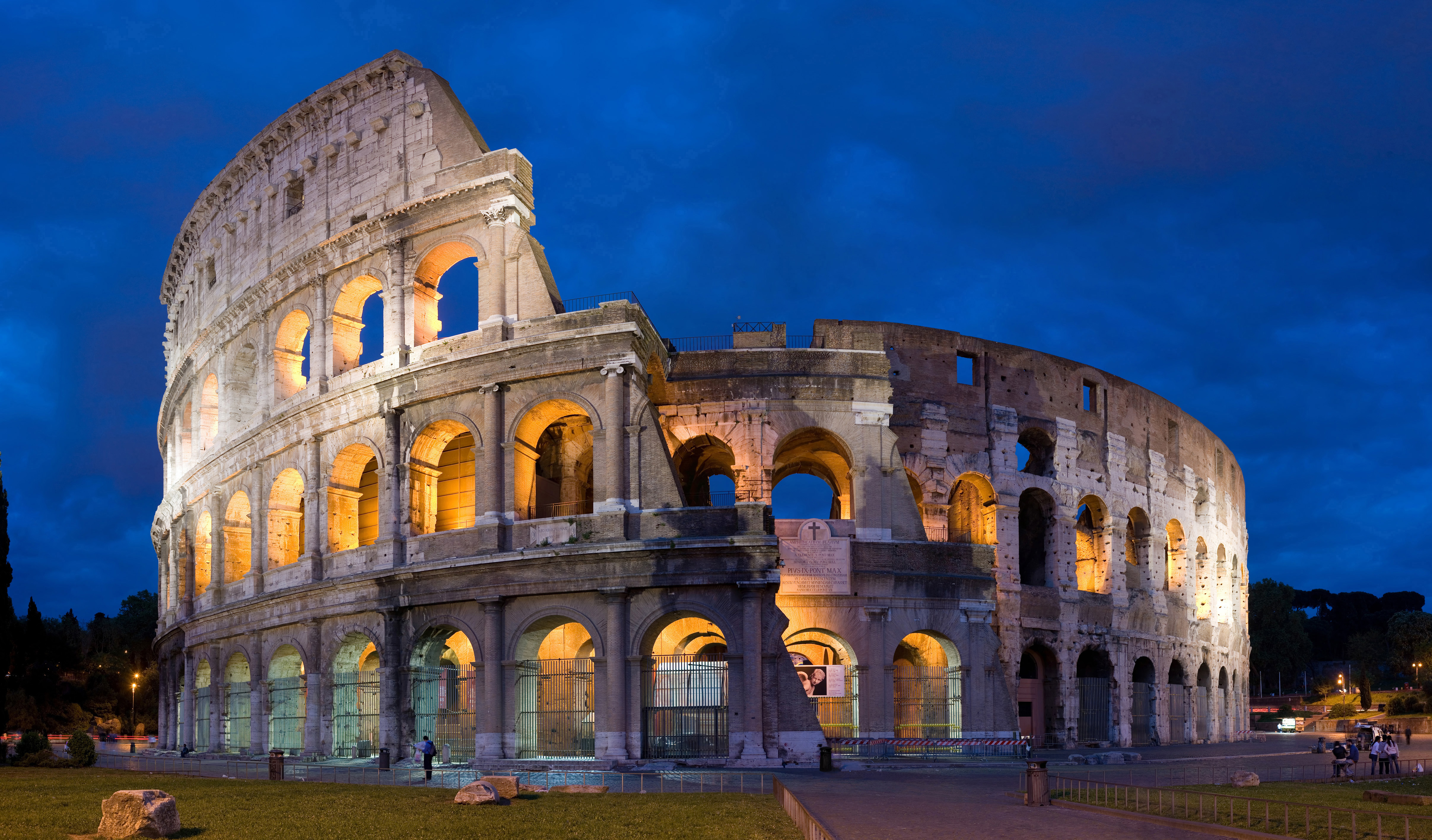
The exterior of the Colosseum at night, showing the partially intact outer wall (left) and the mostly intact inner wall (right), one of the best-known symbols of the Roman Empire

This is a list of ancient great powers. A great power is a nation or state that through economic, political or military strength is able to exert power and influence over not only its own region, but beyond to others.

The first recognized great powers came about in Europe after the Napoleonic era when the formalization of the division between small powers and great powers came with the signing of the Treaty of Chaumont in 1814. At this time great powers are not what we think about today, but large aways changing, combining, and at war empires.

== Ancient Africa and Western Asia ==
=== Sumer and Akkad ===
Sumer

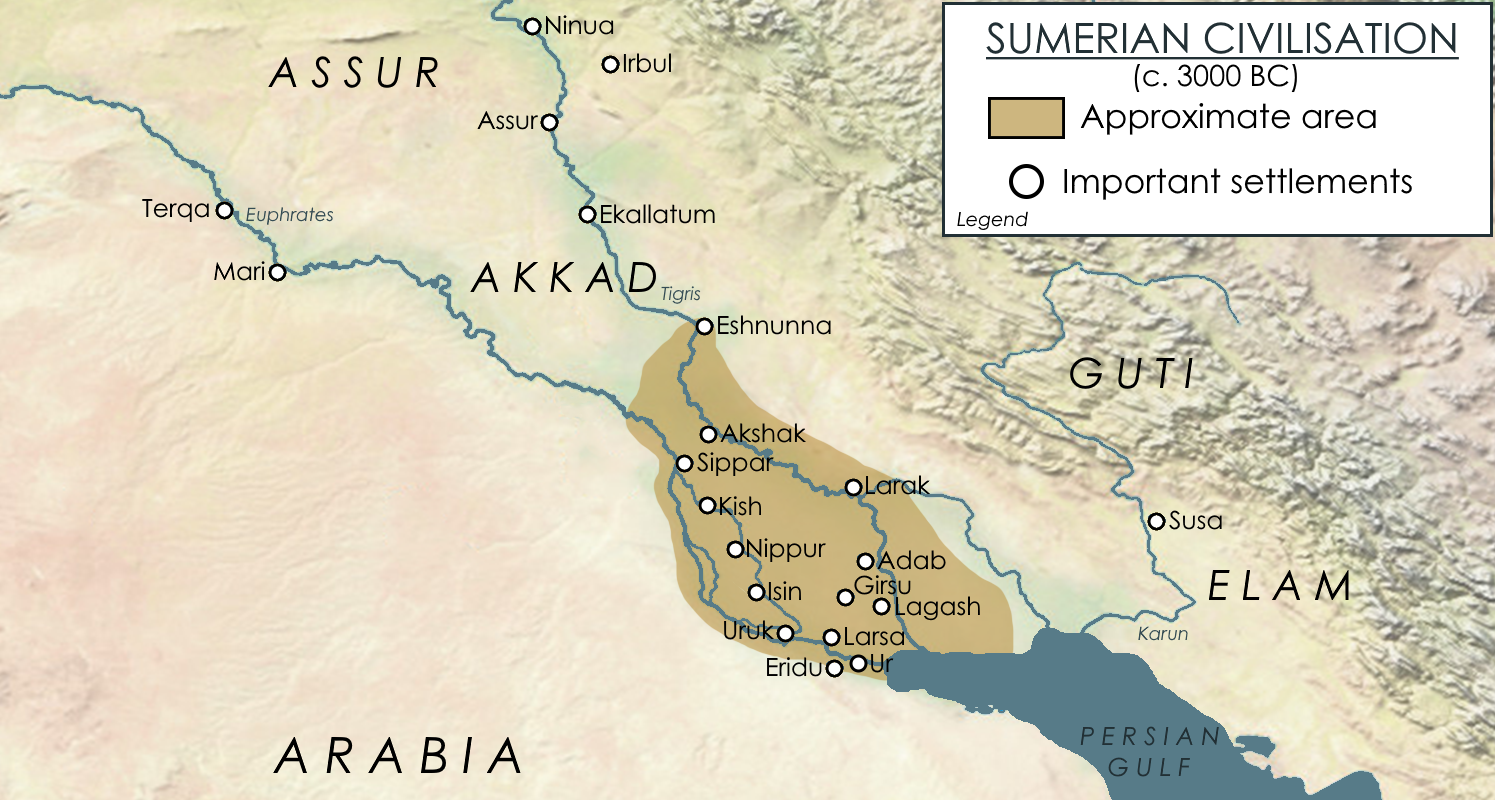
Map of the approximate area and major settlements of Sumer

Sumer is among the earliest known civilizations of the Ancient Near East, located in southern Mesopotamia in what is modern-day Iraq in the 4th millennium BC until the rise of Babylonia in the late 3rd millennium BC. The term "Sumerian" applies to all speakers of the Sumerian language, and the city-states in the region. Multiple dynasties and empires ruled over the Sumerian city-states, the most influential one being the Akkadian Empire.

=== Hurrians ===
Hurrians

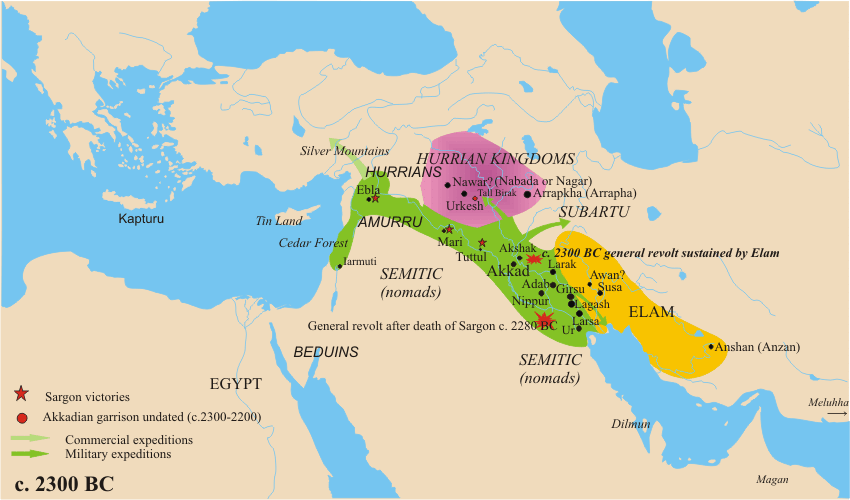
Hurrian kingdom in 2300 BC Akkad Elam

The Hurrians were a people who inhabited the Ancient Near East, including Northern Mesopotamia and adjacent regions, during the Bronze Age. The largest and most influential Hurrian state was the Kingdom of Mitanni, which reached its peak around 1500 BC. The Hittite Empire included a large Hurrian population and the Hurrian culture had a significant influence on Hittite religion.

By the Early Iron Age, the Hurrians had been assimilated with other peoples, except perhaps in the Kingdom of Urartu. The Hurrian peoples were not incredibly united, existing as quasi-feudal kingdoms. The Kingdom of Mitanni was at its height towards the close of the 14th century BC. By the 13th century BC, the Hurrian kingdoms had been conquered by foreign powers, chiefly the Assyrians.

=== Babylonia ===
The profound political, social, and cultural influence imposed upon the Near East by the civilization known as the Ancient Babylonian Empire was the most pervasive in this historical period. The city itself, Babylon, positioned itself as a center of pivotal historical developments for centuries. There were 3 major Babylonian Dynasties: Amorite, Kassite, and Chaldean. This political entity was most predominate within the southern portion of Mesopotamia. It existed as an unremitting rival of the northern Assyrian Mesopotamians. Although it was assaulted and militarily overcome on several occasions, it did exist as a stalwart presence from the later 3rd millennium BC to the middle of the 6th century BC. After the fall of the Assyrian Empire in 612 BC, the Babylonian Empire was the most powerful state in the ancient world. Its capital, Babylon, was beautifully adorned by King Nebuchadnezzar, who erected several famous buildings. Even after the Babylonian Empire had been overthrown by the Persian king Cyrus the Great in 539 BC, the city itself remained an important cultural center. This period would be considered the zenith of Babylon's dominance in its two-and-a-half millennium history. Ancient Babylon was officially conquered by the Achaemenid Persian Empire in the late 6th century BC.

=== Assyria ===
Neo-Assyrian Empire

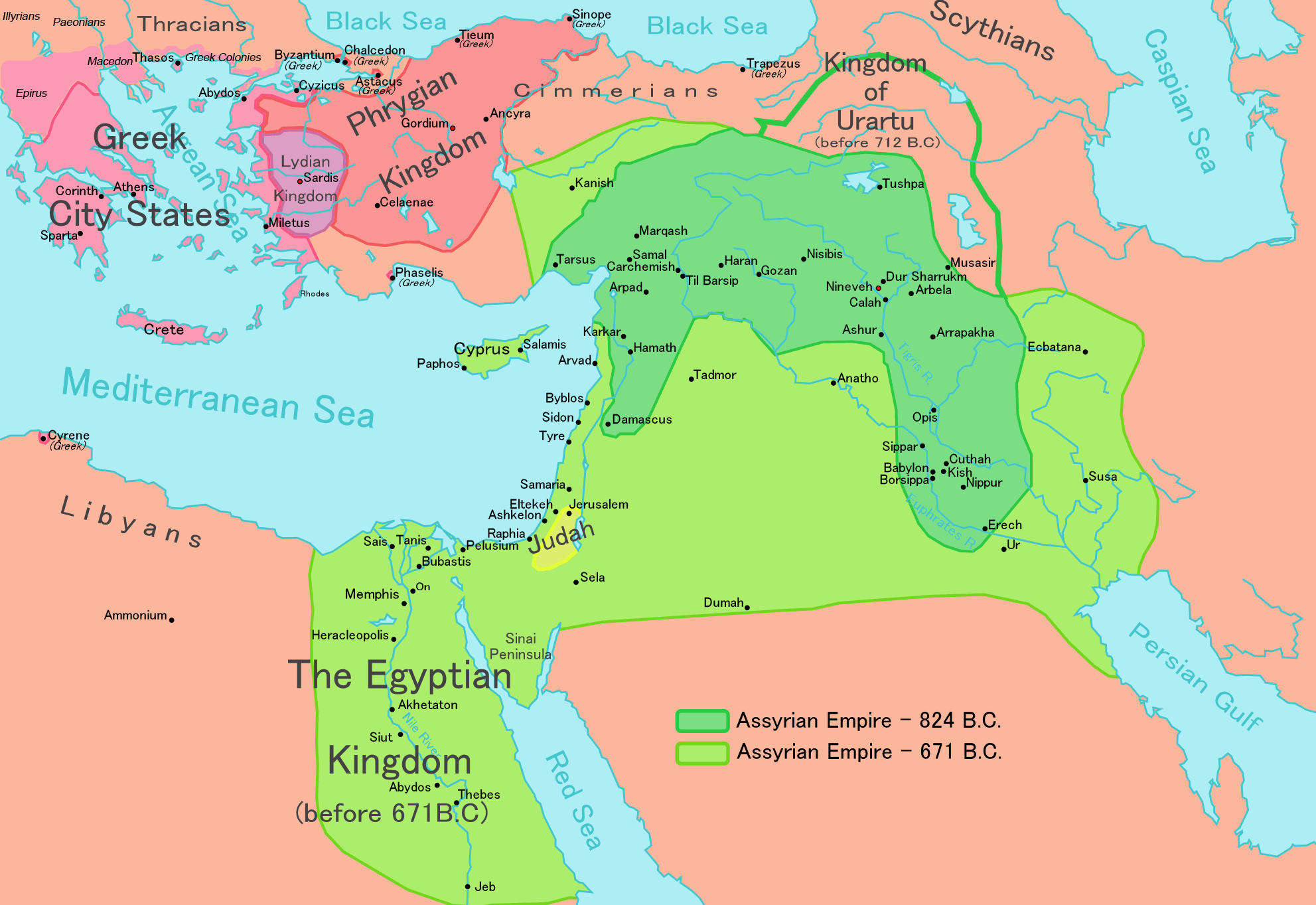
Neo-Assyrian Empire Assyrian Empire - 824 BC Assyrian Empire - 671 BC Other Judah Phrygian Kingdom Lydian Kingdom Greek City States

In early times, the term Assyria referred to a region on the Upper Tigris river, named for its original capital, the ancient city of Assur. Later, as a nation and empire that came to control all of the Fertile Crescent, Egypt and much of Anatolia, the term "Assyria proper" referred to roughly the northern half of Mesopotamia (the southern half being Babylonia), with Nineveh as its capital. The Assyrian homeland was located near a mountainous region, extending along the Tigris as far as the high Gordiaean or Carduchian mountain range of Armenia, sometimes known as the "Mountains of Ashur". The Assyrian kings controlled a large kingdom at three different times in history. These are called the Old, Middle, and Neo-Assyrian kingdoms, or periods. The most powerful and best-known nation of these periods is the Neo-Assyrian Empire, 934–609 BC.

Shalmaneser III (858–823 BC) attacked and reduced Babylonia to vassalage, and defeated Aramea, Israel, Urartu, Phoenicia and the Neo-Hittite states, forcing all of these to pay tribute to Assyria. Shamshi-Adad V (822–811 BC) inherited an empire beset by civil war which he took most of his reign to quell. He was succeeded by Adad-nirari III who was merely a boy. The Empire was thus ruled by the famed queen Semiramis until 806 BC. In that year Adad-nirari III took the reins of power. After his premature death, Assyria failed to expand further during the reigns of Shalmaneser IV (782–773 BC), Ashur-dan III (772–755 BC) and Ashur-nirari V (754–746 BC).

Under Ashurbanipal (669–627 BC) its domination spanned from the Caucasus Mountains in the north to Nubia, Egypt and Arabia in the south, and from Cyprus and Antioch in the west to Persia in the east. Ashurbanipal destroyed Elam and smashed a rebellion led by his own brother Shamash-shum-ukim who was the Assyrian king of Babylon, exacting savage revenge on the Chaldeans, Nabateans, Arabs and Elamites who had supported him. Persia and Media were regarded as vassals of Ashurbanipal. He built vast libraries and initiated a surge in the building of temples and palaces.

=== Hittites ===
Hittite Empire

Approximate extent of Hittite rule, c. 1350–1300 BC; Arzawa and the Lukka are to the west, with Mitanni to the southeast.

The Hittites were an ancient people who spoke an Indo-European language, and established a kingdom in the great loop of the Kızılırmak River, centered at Hattusa, in north-central Anatolia, from the 18th century BC. In the 14th century BC, the Hittite Empire was at its height, encompassing central Anatolia, northwestern Syria as far as Ugarit, and upper Mesopotamia. After 1180 BC, the empire disintegrated into several independent "Neo-Hittite" city-states, some surviving until as late as the 8th century BC.

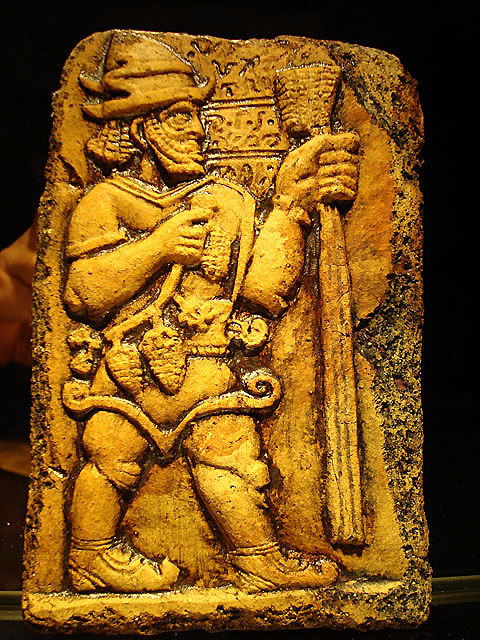
Tarḫunna, the storm god and the god of thunder in the Hittite religion (8th century BC)

The Hittites were also famous for their skill in building and using chariots, some of which could carry up to three men each, as the Battle of Kadesh demonstrated. The Hittites have been said to be pioneers of the Iron Age. Actual iron objects found at Hittite sites (such as Bogazköy and Alaca Höyük) don't give any indication of iron having been used functionally, although a few early Hittite sources make many references to many different types of iron objects. However, these are mainly temples' inventory lists, so the objects listed are there because of their 'ceremonial or intrinsic value' only. The Late Bronze Age Ḫattušili III letter which documents Hittite production and export of iron has been used to make the claim that the Hittites held a monopoly of iron at that time. However, there is literary and material evidence in other areas around the Eastern Mediterranean which seems to detract from this idea. The Hittites passed much knowledge and lore from the Ancient Near East to the newly arrived Greeks in Europe.

Hittite prosperity was mostly dependent on control of the trade routes and metal sources. Because of the importance of northern Syria to the vital routes linking the Cilician Gates with Mesopotamia, defense of this area was crucial, and was soon put to the test by Egyptian expansion under Pharaoh Rameses II. The outcome of the Battle of Kadesh is uncertain, though it seems that the timely arrival of Egyptian reinforcements prevented total Hittite victory. The Egyptians forced the Hittites to take refuge in the fortress of Kadesh, but their own losses prevented them from sustaining a siege. This battle took place in the fifth year of Rameses II (c. 1274 BC by the most commonly used chronology).

=== Phoenicia ===
Ancient Phoenicia

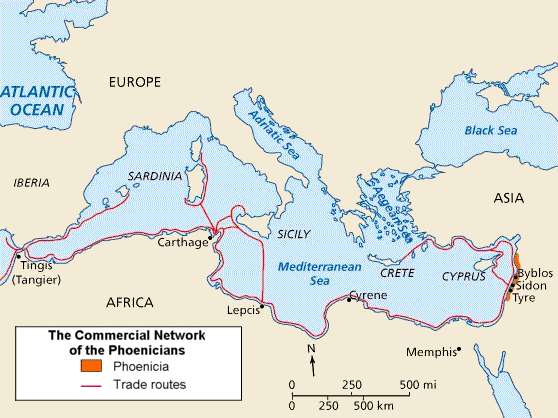
Phoenicia Territory in the 3rd century BC

Phoenicia was a major power over the Mediterranean between 1200 BC and 539 BC. This ancient Semitic thalassocratic civilization was situated on the western, coastal part of the Fertile Crescent and centered on the coastline of modern Lebanon. All major Phoenician cities were on the coastline of the Mediterranean, some colonies reaching the Western Mediterranean. It was an enterprising maritime trading culture that spread across the Mediterranean from 1550 BC to 300 BC. The Phoenicians used the galley, a man-powered sailing vessel, and are credited with the invention of the bireme. They were famed in Classical Greece and Rome as 'traders in purple', referring to their monopoly on the precious purple dye of the Murex snail, used, among other things, for royal clothing, and for the spread of their alphabets, from which almost all modern phonetic alphabets are derived.

=== Carthage ===
Ancient Carthage was a Phoenician civilization based in North Africa, with its capital, the city of Carthage, located in present-day Tunisia. Founded by Phoenician settlers from the city-state of Tyre in the 9th century BC as a small trading colony, Carthage would soon grow and become independent. Carthage began expanding and creating colonies across the Mediterranean, becoming a major power in the region and coming into conflict with its neighbors.

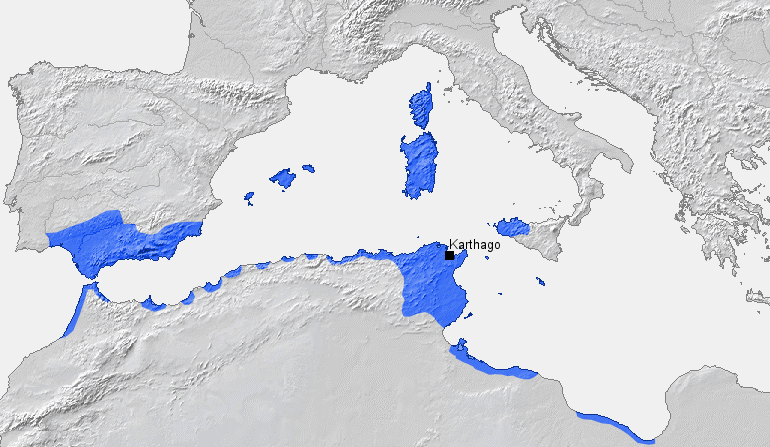
Carthaginian territory prior to the First Punic War

The city-states of Ancient Greece created colonies in the Mediterranean that would rival Carthage, namely Syracuse (Ancient Greek: Συράκουσαι), which was founded in the 8th century BC by Corinthian settlers. Syracuse became one of the wealthiest and most powerful city-states in the region and it would rival Carthage for control of the central Mediterranean. The island of Sicily was sought by both Carthage and Syracuse, with both attempting to control the island, leading to the Sicilian Wars which were fought from 580 to 265 BC but were ultimately inconclusive with the Carthaginians retaining western Sicily and the Greeks retaining eastern Sicily.

The Punic Wars be tween the Roman Republic and Carthage began in Sicily, with Rome's expansionism causing war with Carthage. The First Punic War began in 264 BC and was a Roman victory, ending with the Treaty of Lutatius in 241 BC and the Romans annexing all of Sicily except Syracuse. The Second Punic War began in 218 BC, and during this war, the Carthaginians under the general Hannibal achieved many victories against the Romans, particularly at the Battle of Cannae, where the Romans were surrounded and annihilated by the Carthaginians. However, the Romans invaded Africa under general Scipio Africanus and defeated Carthage at the Battle of Zama in 202 BC and ended the Second Punic War in 201 BC with a peace treaty in which Rome conquered Iberia and reduced Carthaginian Africa and imposed an indemnity on Carthage and restricted its military. The Third Punic War began in 149 BC, when King Masinissa of Numidia took advantage of Carthage's treaty with Rome which prohibited Carthage from declaring war without permission of the Senate and began to invade Carthage and seize its territory. In 151 BC, Carthage sent an army but was defeated at the Battle of Oroscopa and Rome would declare war using this military action as a pretext for war. A Roman army landed at Utica in 149 BC, and despite the Carthaginians surrendering their weapons hoping to appease them, the Romans besieged Carthage. The Romans would lay siege to the city before launching a final assault in 146 BC and breaching the walls. Rome would then systematically destroy the city of Carthage and enslave tens of thousands of its inhabitants. Following the destruction of Carthage, Rome established the province of Africa and made Utica the capital of the province. From 49 to 44 BC, Carthage was rebuilt as a colony by Julius Caesar which would become Roman Carthage.

=== Ancient Iran ===
==== Elam ====
Elamite Empire

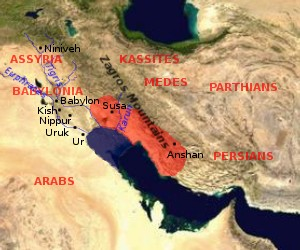
Elamite Empire The approximate Bronze Age Elamite Empire extension of the Persian Gulf is shown.

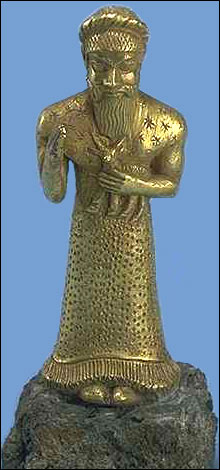
Elamite worshipper

Elam was situated just to the east of Mesopotamia and was one of the oldest recorded civilizations. Elam was centered in the far west and southwest of modern-day Iran, stretching from the lowlands of Khuzestan and Ilam Province (which takes its name from Elam), as well as a small part of southern Iraq. In the Old Elamite period (Middle Bronze Age), Elam consisted of kingdoms on the Iranian plateau, centered in Anshan, and from the mid-2nd millennium BC, it was centered in Susa in the Khuzestan lowlands.

Elam was part of the early cities of the Ancient Near East during the Chalcolithic (Copper Age). The emergence of written records from around 3000 BC also parallels Mesopotamian history where writing was used slightly earlier. Elamite strength was based on an ability to hold various areas together under a coordinated government that permitted the maximum interchange of the natural resources unique to each region. Traditionally, this was done through a federated governmental structure.

Elamite culture played a crucial role in the Persian Empire, especially during the Achaemenid dynasty that succeeded it, when the Elamite language remained among those in official use. The Elamite language is generally treated as a language isolate. As such, the Elamite period is considered a starting point for the history of Iran.

==== Medes ====
Median Empire

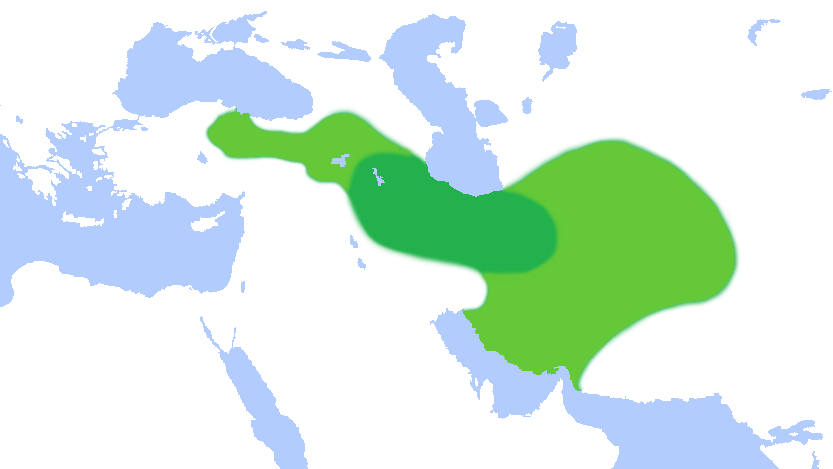
A map of the Median Empire at its greatest extent (6th century BC), according to Herodotus

The Median Empire was the first empire on the territory of Persia. By the 6th century BC, after having together with the Babylonians defeated the Neo-Assyrian Empire. In Greek references to "Median" people there is no clear distinction between the "Persians" and the "Medians"; in fact for a Greek to become "too closely associated with Iranian culture" was "to become medianized, not persianized". The Median kingdom was a short-lived Iranian state and the textual and archaeological sources of that period are rare and little could be known from the Median culture which nevertheless made a "profound, and lasting, contribution to the greater world of Iranian culture". The Medes were able to establish their own empire, the largest of its day, lasting for about sixty years, from the sack of Nineveh in 612 BC until 549 BC when Cyrus the Great established the Achaemenid Empire by defeating his overlord and grandfather, Astyages, king of Media.

==== Achaemenid Empire ====
550 BC–330 BC

Achaemenid Empire

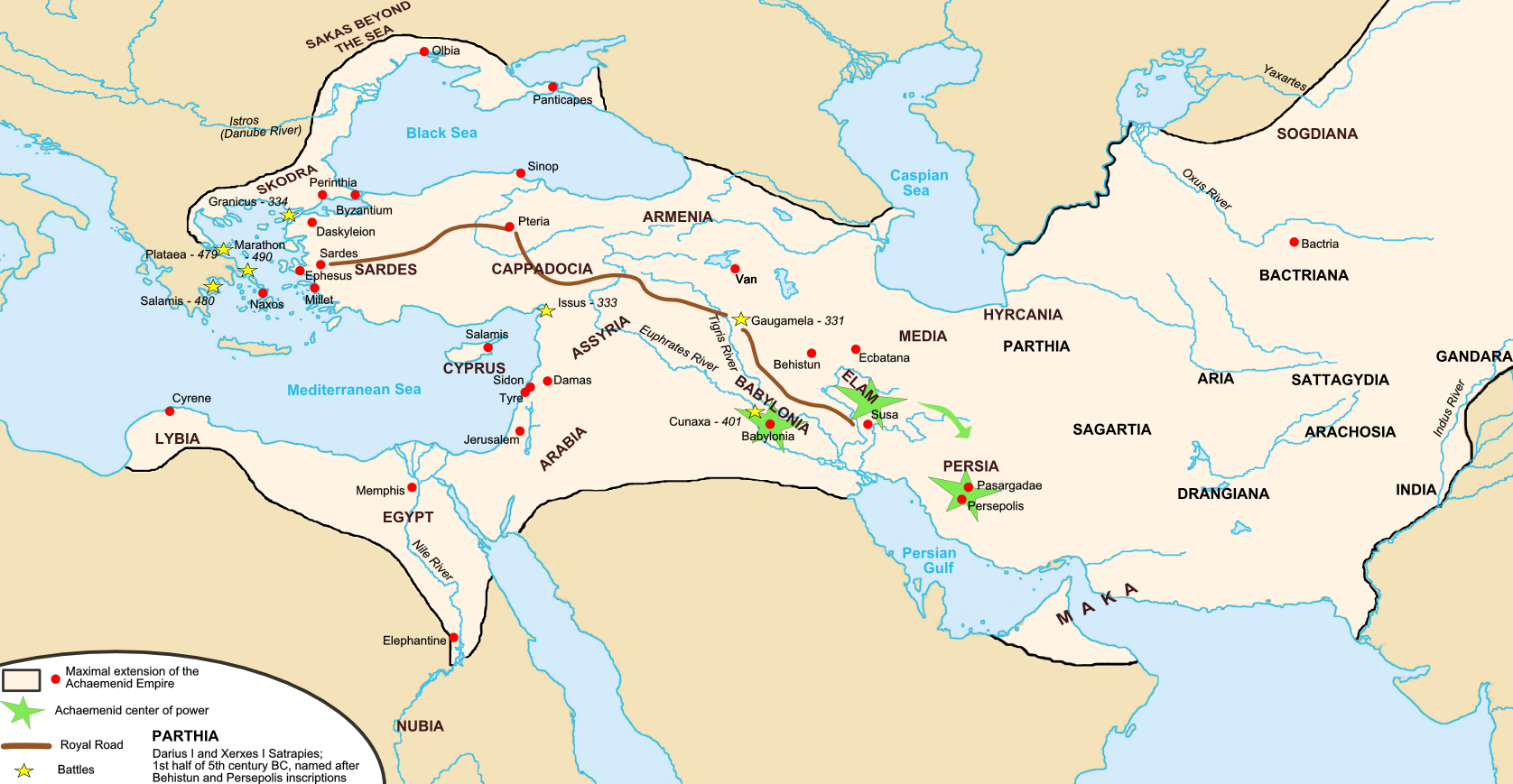
Achaemenid Persian Empire during its zenith Outlying regions Achaemenid imperial region cities, battles, power centers

The Achaemenid Empire was the first of the Persian Empires to become a world empire. At the height of its power, the Empire spanned over three continents, namely Europe, Asia, and Africa, and was the most powerful empire of its time. It also eventually, either quickly in its earliest days or steadily over time, incorporated the following territories: in the north and west all of Asia Minor (modern Turkey), parts of the Balkan Peninsula - Thrace, Macedon and Paeonia, and most of the Black Sea coastal regions or present day southern and eastern Bulgaria, northern Greece, and Macedonia; in the west and southwest the territories of modern Iraq, northern Saudi Arabia, Jordan, Israel, Lebanon, Syria, all significant population centers of ancient Egypt and as far west as portions of Libya; in the east modern Afghanistan and beyond into central Asia, and parts of Pakistan.

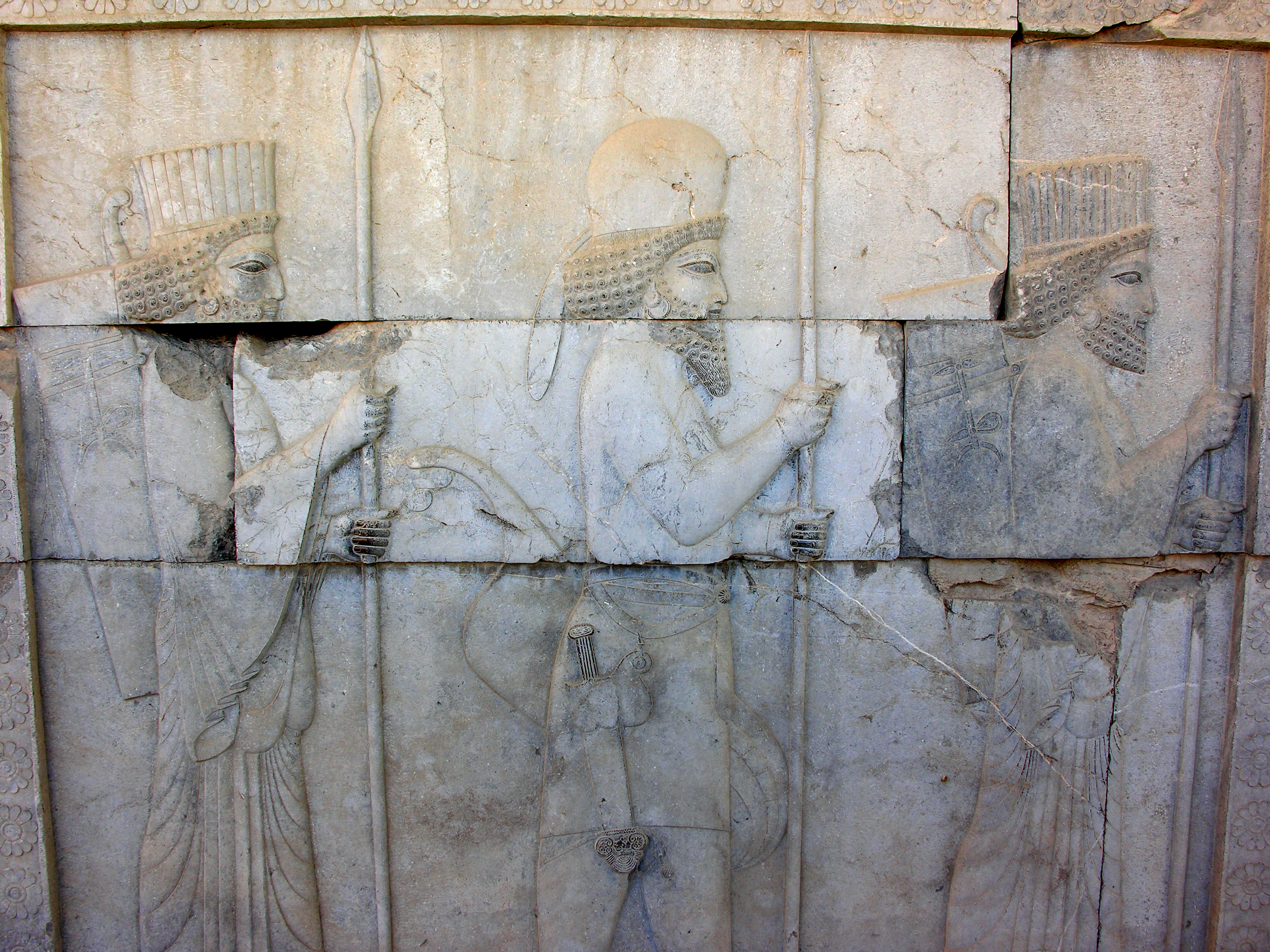
Achaemenids warriors

Encompassing approximately 5.5 million square kilometers at its height in 500 BC, the Achaemenid Empire was territorially the largest empire of antiquity. In its time it had political power over neighboring countries, and had high cultural and economic achievements during its lengthy rule over a vast region from its picturesque capital at Persepolis.

Alexander the Great (Alexander III of Macedon) defeated the Persian armies at Granicus (334 BC), followed by Issus (333 BC), and lastly at Gaugamela (331 BC). Afterwards, he marched on Susa and Persepolis which surrendered in early 330 BC. From Persepolis, Alexander headed north to Pasargadae where he visited the tomb of Cyrus the Great.

=== Armenia ===
==== Great Armenia ====
331 BC–428 AD

Kingdom of Armenia

The Kingdom of Armenia was one of the first Armenian Empires. The height of the kingdom came under the rule of Tigranes the Great, the Empire spanned over many parts of countries, namely the modern-day countries of Turkey, Iran, Syria and Lebanon. The Kingdom of Armenia has three distinct dynasties - the Orontid dynasty, the Artaxiad dynasty, and the Arsacid dynasty of Armenia. During the reign of the Orontid dynasty, in 321 B.C Armenia became independent from the Achaemenids. During the reign of the Artaxiad dynasty, Armenia reached the peak of its power. During the reign of the Arsacid dynasty, Armenia became the first country in the world to adopt Christianity as an official religion.

In 387, the Kingdom of Armenia was split between the Eastern Roman Empire and the Sassanid Empire. Western Armenia first became a province of the Roman Empire under the name of Armenia Minor, and later Byzantine Armenia; Eastern Armenia remained a kingdom within Persia until, in 428, the local nobility overthrew the king, and the Sassanids installed a marzban (governor) in his place, beginning the Marzpanate period over Persian Armenia.

=== Iran ===
==== Parthian Empire ====
Parthian Empire

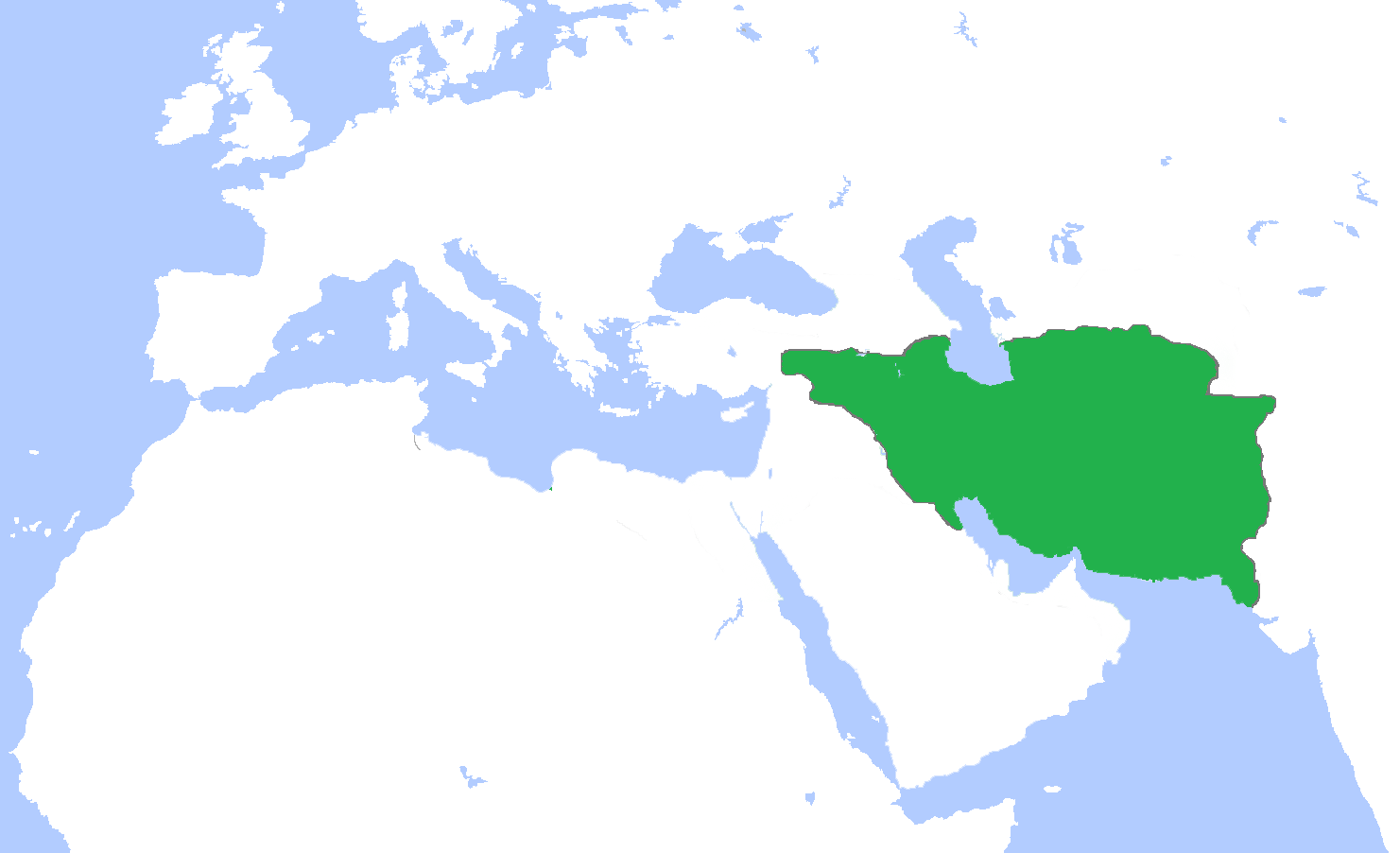
The Parthian empire at its greatest extent

The Parthian Empire was the third Iranian Empire. At the height of its power, the empire ruled most of Greater Iran, Mesopotamia and Armenia. But unlike most other Iranian monarchies, the Parthian followed a vassal system, which they adopted from the Seleucids. The Arsacid culture was not a single coherent state, but instead made up of numerous tributary (but otherwise independent) kingdoms.

The Parthians largely adopted the art, architecture, religious beliefs, and royal insignia of their culturally heterogeneous empire, which encompassed Persian, Hellenistic, and regional cultures. For about the first half of its existence, the Arsacid court adopted elements of Greek culture, though it eventually saw a gradual revival of Iranian traditions. The Arsacid rulers were titled the 'King of Kings', as a claim to be the heirs to the Achaemenid Empire; indeed, they accepted many local kings as vassals where the Achaemenids would have had centrally appointed, albeit largely autonomous, satraps. The court did appoint a small number of satraps, largely outside Iran, but these satrapies were smaller and less powerful than the Achaemenid potentates. With the expansion of Arsacid power, the seat of central government shifted from Nisa, Turkmenistan to Ctesiphon along the Tigris (south of modern Baghdad, Iraq), although several other sites also served as capitals. Although the Parthian Arsacids made way for a new Iranian dynasty, the Arsacid family continued to exist through the Arsacid dynasty of Armenia, the Arsacid dynasty of Iberia, and the Arsacid Dynasty of Caucasian Albania; all eponymous branches of the Parthian Arsacids.

==== Sasanian Empire ====
Sassanid Empire

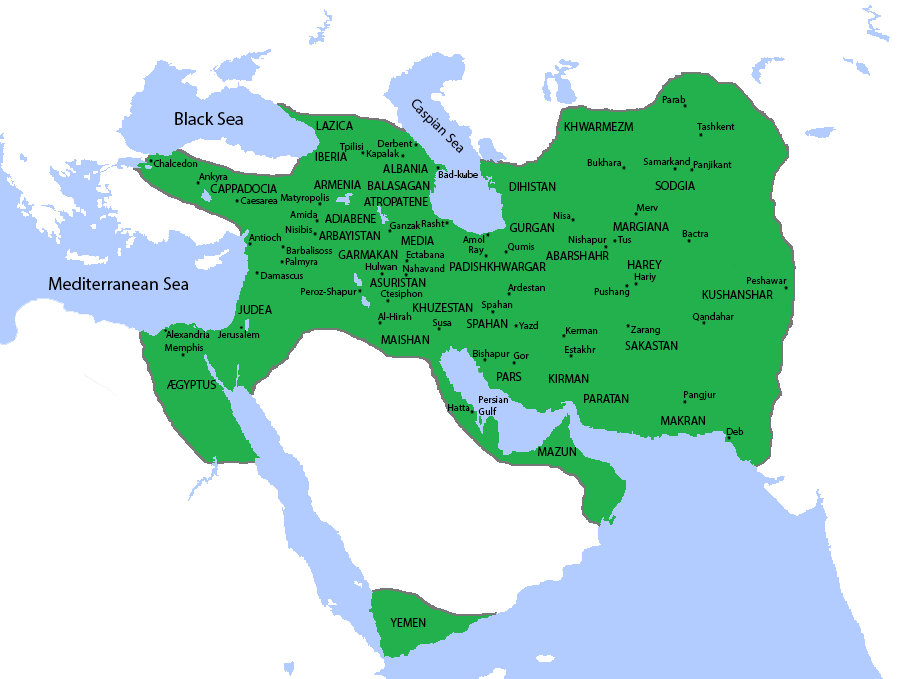
The Sassanid Empire around its greatest extent

The Sasanian Empire is the name used for the fourth Iranian dynasty, and the second Persian Empire (226–651). The empire's territory encompassed all of today's Iran, Iraq, Armenia, Afghanistan, eastern parts of Turkey, and parts of Syria, Pakistan, and large parts of Caucasia, Central Asia and Arabia. During Khosrow II's rule in 590–628 Egypt, Jordan, Israel, Lebanon were also briefly annexed to the Empire, as well as far west as western Asia Minor. The Sassanid era, encompassing the length of the Late Antiquity period, is considered to be one of the most important and influential historical periods in Iran. In many ways the Sassanid period witnessed the highest achievement of Persian civilization. The empire is furthermore known for being the arch-rival of the neighboring Roman–Byzantine Empire for a period of over 400 years. As the Parthians were replaced by the Sassanids, they carried on the already century long lasting Roman–Persian Wars, which would eventually become the longest conflict in human history.

The empire constituted the last great Iranian Empire before the Muslim conquest and adoption of Islam. The climactic Byzantine–Sasanian War of 602–628 had drastically exhausted both the Byzantines as well as the Sassanids, laying the way open for an easy conquest. The Sassanids, heavily weakened, never mounted a truly effective resistance to the pressure applied by the initial Arab armies. Ctesiphon fell after a prolonged siege. Yazdegerd fled eastward from Ctesiphon, leaving behind him most of the Empire's vast treasury. The Arabs captured Ctesiphon shortly afterward, leaving the Sassanid government strapped for funds and acquiring a powerful financial resource for their own use. A number of Sassanid governors attempted to combine their forces to throw back the invaders, but the effort was crippled by the lack of a strong central authority, and the governors were defeated at the Battle of Nihawānd. The empire, with its military command structure non-existent, its non-noble troop levies decimated, its financial resources effectively destroyed, and the Asawaran knightly caste destroyed piecemeal, was utterly helpless in the face of the invaders. Upon hearing the defeat, Persian nobilities fled further inland to the eastern province of Khorasan.

=== Kush ===
Kingdom of Kush

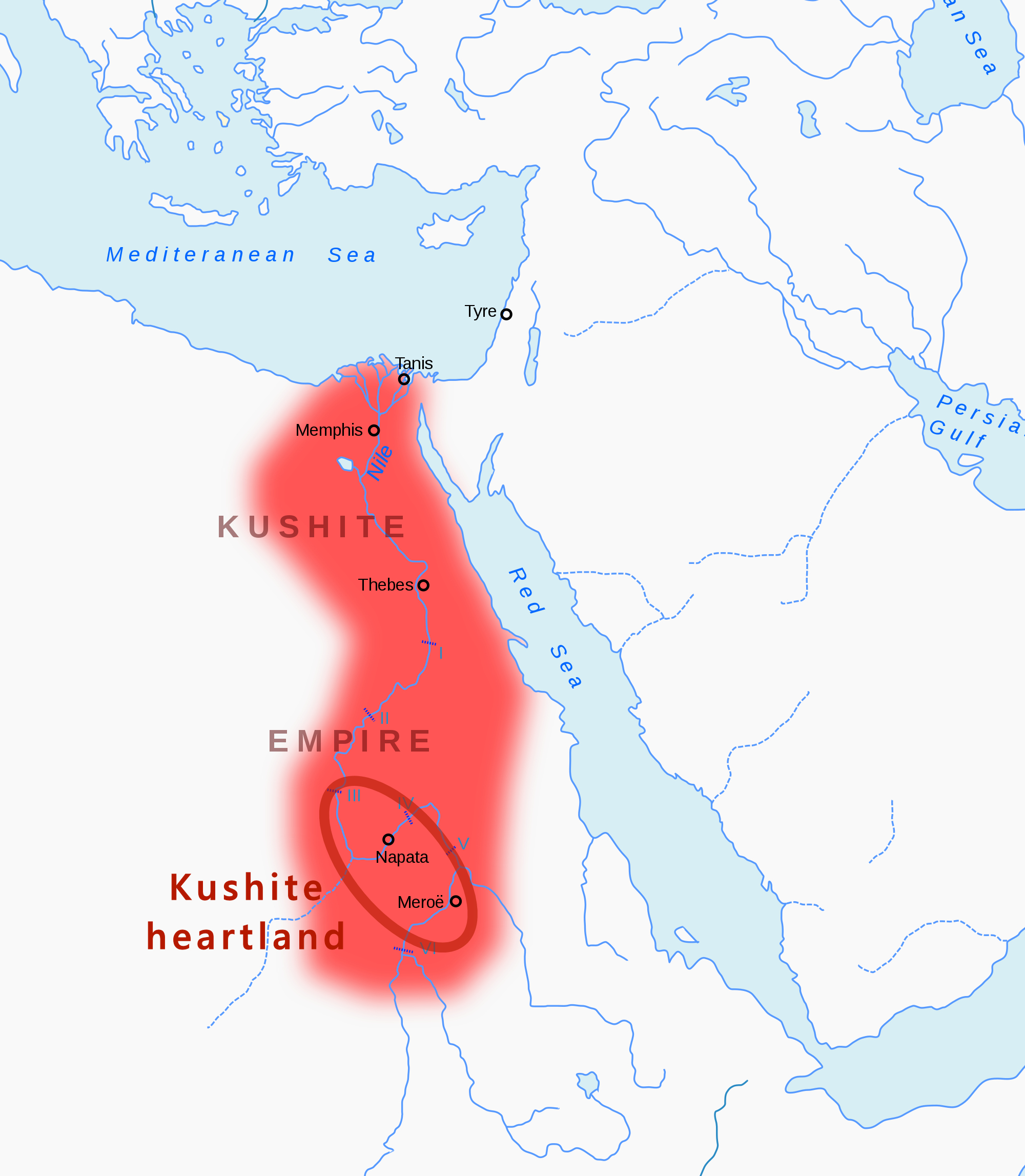
The maximum territorial extent of Kush circa 700 BC

The Kingdom of Kush was the earliest of the Subsaharan states in Africa as well as the first to implement iron weapons. It was heavily influenced by Egyptian colonists, but in 1070 BC it became not only independent of Egypt but a fierce rival. It successfully fought off attempts by Egypt to reconquer it, and it began to extend influence over Upper Egypt. By the end of King Kashta's reign in 752 BC, Thebes was under Kushite control.

A slew of able successors took the rest of Egypt and reigned as the Twenty-fifth Dynasty of Egypt stretching Kushite control from central Sudan to modern-day Israel. The Kushites did not maintain this empire for long and were beaten back by the Assyrians in 653 BC. However, Kush remained a powerful entity in the region. It continued to meddle in Egyptian affairs and control trade resources originating in Subsaharan Africa. It waged a hard-fought campaign against the Roman Empire (27 BC - 22 BC) under the leadership of Queen Amanirenas, and achieved a more than amicable peace with the young Augustus Caesar. The two states worked as allies, with Kush lending cavalry support to Rome in its conquest of Jerusalem in 70 AD.

The kingdom of Kush maintained its status as a regional power until its conquest by the Aksumite Empire in 350.

=== Macrobia ===
Reconstruction of the Oikumene (inhabited world) ancient map from Herodotus, c. 450 BC

The Macrobians were an ancient people and kingdom situated in the Horn of Africa (Somalia) around the 1st millennium BC. According to Herodotus, the Macrobians practiced an elaborate form of embalming. This, in turn, suggested a knowledge on their part of anatomy and, at the very least, a grasp of the basics of chemistry. The Macrobians preserved the bodies of the dead by first extracting moisture from the corpses, then overlaying the bodies with a type of plaster, and finally decorating the exterior in vivid colors in order to imitate the deceased as realistically as possible. They then placed the body in a hollow crystal pillar, which they kept in their homes for a period of about a year. Macrobia was also noted for its gold, which was so plentiful that the Macrobians shackled their prisoners in golden chains.

The Ancient city-states located in northern Somalia, had a steady trade link with the Ancient Egyptians and exported precious natural resources such as myrrh, frankincense and gum. This trade network continued all the way into the classical era. The city states of Mossylon, Malao, Mundus and Tabae in Somalia engaged in a lucrative trade network connecting Somali merchants with Phoenicia, Ptolemaic Egypt, Greece, Parthian Persia, Saba, Nabataea and the Roman Empire. Somali sailors used the ancient Somali maritime vessel known as the 'beden' to transport their cargo.

=== Kingdom of Aksum ===
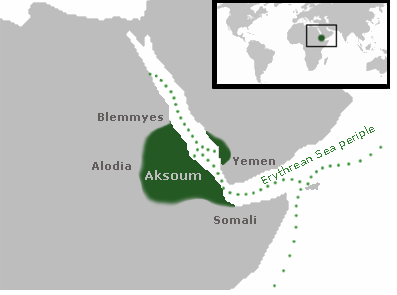
Aksumite Empire based in Ethiopia

The Kingdom of Aksum was an important trading nation originating from Northern Ethiopia in northeastern Africa, growing from the proto-Aksumite period ca. 4th century BC to achieve prominence by the 1st century AD. It was a major player in the commerce between the Roman Empire and Ancient India and the Aksumite rulers facilitated trade by minting their own currency. The state established its hegemony over the declining Kingdom of Kush and regularly entered the politics of the kingdoms on the Arabian peninsula, and would eventually extend its rule over the region with the conquest of the Himyarite Kingdom. At its peak it controlled Much of Ethiopia, Eritrea, Djibouti, Sudan, Somalia, Yemen, and Saudi Arabia. It was considered by historians as one of the most powerful military powers in the world.

=== Kerma ===
The Kerma culture was an early civilization which flourished from around 2500 BC to about 1600 BC in Nubia, present day Sudan, centered at Kerma. It seems to have been one of a number of Sudanese states during the Middle Kingdom period of Ancient Egypt. In its latest phase, lasting from about 1700–1500 BC, it absorbed the Sudanese kingdom of Sai and became a sizable, populous empire rivaling Egypt. Around 1500 BC, it was absorbed into the Egyptian Empire, but rebellions continued for centuries. By the 11th century BC, the more 'Egyptianized' Kingdom of Kush emerged, apparently from Kerma, and regained the region's independence from Egypt.

== Ancient Egypt ==
Ancient Egypt

Major ancient Egyptian cities during the Dynastic period

Ancient Egypt was one of the world's first civilizations, with its beginnings in the fertile Nile valley around 3150 BC. Ancient Egypt reached the zenith of its power during the New Kingdom (1570–1070 BC) under great pharaohs. Ancient Egypt was a great power to be contended with by both the ancient Near East, the Mediterranean and sub-Saharan Africa. The empire expanded far south into Nubia and held wide territories across the ancient Near East. The combination of a fertile river valley, natural borders that made an invasion unfeasible, and a military able to rise to the challenge when needed, turned Egypt into a major power.

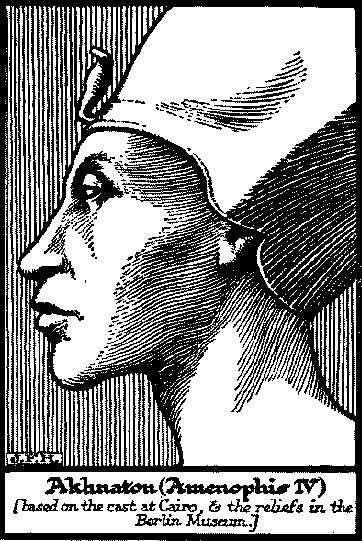
Drawing of Akhnaton Cairo Cast

It was one of the first nations to have a system of writing and large scale construction projects. However, as neighboring civilizations developed militaries capable of crossing Egypt's natural barriers, the Egyptian armies were not always able to repel them and so by 1000 BC Egyptian influence as an independent civilization waned.

=== Early Dynastic Period ===
The Archaic or Early Dynastic Period of Egypt is the era immediately following the unification of Upper and Lower Egypt c. 3100 BC. It is generally taken to include the First and Second Dynasties, lasting from the end of the Naqada III archaeological period until about 2686 BC, or the beginning of the Old Kingdom. With the First Dynasty, the capital moved from Thinis to Memphis with a unified Egypt ruled by an Egyptian god-king. Abydos remained the major holy land in the south. The hallmarks of ancient Egyptian civilization, such as art, architecture and many aspects of religion, took shape during the Early Dynastic period. During the Early Dynastic period, the pharaohs established the earliest Central Government in the world.

=== Old Kingdom ===
The Old Kingdom is the period spanning c. 2686–2181 BC. It is also known as the "Age of the Pyramids" or the "Age of the Pyramid Builders", as it encompasses the reigns of the great pyramid builders of the Fourth Dynasty—King Sneferu perfected the art of pyramid-building and the pyramids of Giza were constructed under the kings Khufu, Khafre and Menkaure. Egypt attained its first sustained peak of civilization—the first of three so-called "Kingdom" periods (followed by the Middle Kingdom and New Kingdom) which mark the high points of civilization in the lower Nile Valley.

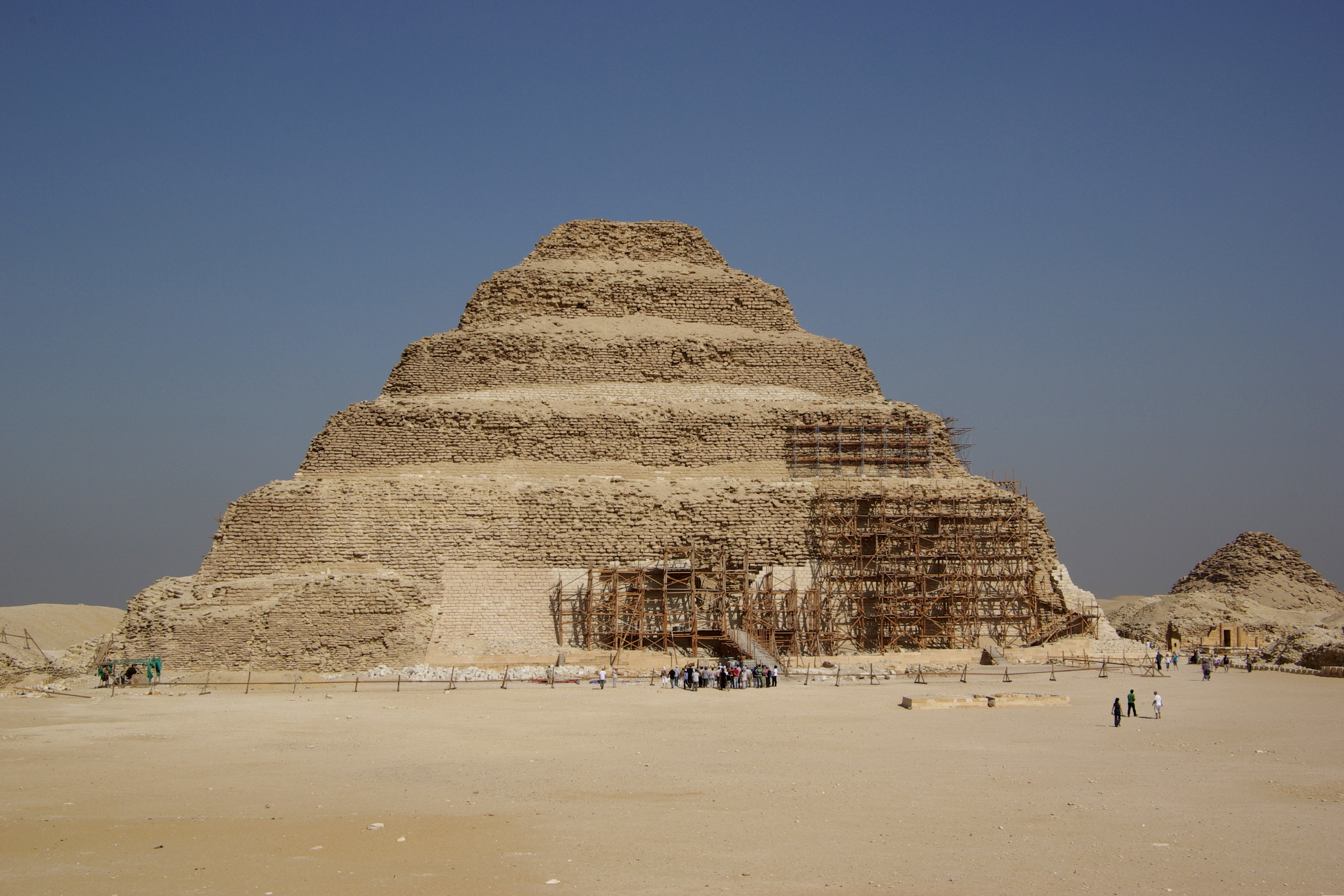
The Pyramid of Djoser at Saqqara

During the Old Kingdom, the pyramid building in ancient Egypt began during the Third Dynasty under the rule of king Djoser when he built the Step Pyramid of Djoser (Egypt's first Pyramid) and peaked during Fourth Dynasty during the construction of the Giza Pyramids.

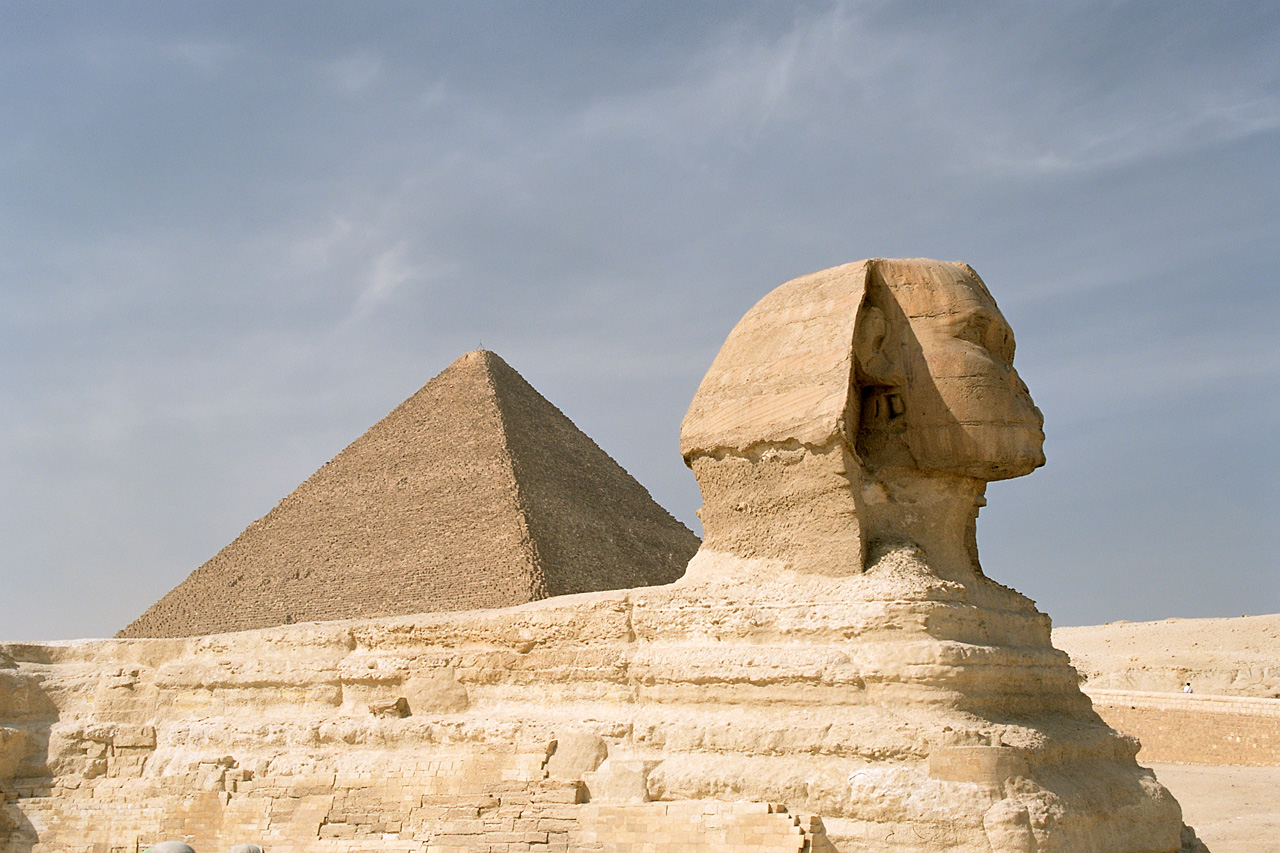
The Great Sphinx of Giza in front of the Great Pyramid of Giza

During the Fifth Dynasty the pyramid building declined in Egypt. The Pyramid Texts, the oldest ritual texts from ancient Egypt first appeared in the late fifth Dynasty.

=== Middle Kingdom ===

The Middle Kingdom of Egypt (also known as "The Period of Reunification") is the period in the history of ancient Egypt following a period of political division known as the First Intermediate Period. The Middle Kingdom lasted from around 2050 BC to around 1710 BC, stretching from the reunification of Egypt under the reign of Mentuhotep II of the Eleventh Dynasty to the end of the Twelfth Dynasty. The Eleventh Dynasty ruled from Thebes and the Twelfth Dynasty ruled from el-Lisht.

The middle kingdom reached its peak under the pharaohs Senusret III and Amenemhat III. Senusret III was a great pharaoh of the Twelfth Dynasty and is considered to be the greatest pharaoh in the middle kingdom. However, The reign of Amenemhat III was the height of Middle Kingdom economic prosperity. His reign is remarkable for the degree to which Egypt exploited its resources.

=== New Kingdom ===
The maximum territorial extent of Ancient Egypt (15th century BC)

The New Kingdom began around 1550 B.C when king Ahmose I became the king of Egypt, defeated the Hyksos and reunified Egypt. The pharaohs of the new kingdom established a period of unprecedented prosperity by securing their borders and strengthening diplomatic ties with their neighbors. Military campaigns waged under Tuthmosis I and his grandson Tuthmosis III extended the influence of the pharaohs to the largest empire Egypt had ever seen. Tuthmosis III is recorded to have captured 350 cities during his rule and conquered much of the Near East from the Euphrates to Nubia during seventeen known military campaigns. During the reign of Amenhotep III, Egypt entered a period of unprecedented prosperity and artistic splendour, Egypt reached the peak of its artistic and international power in his reign. Amenhotep IV ascended the throne and instituted a series of radical and chaotic reforms. Changing his name to Akhenaten, he touted the god Aten as the supreme deity, suppressed the worship of other deities, and attacked the power of the priestly establishment. Moving the capital to the new city of Akhetaten, he turned a deaf ear to foreign affairs and absorbed himself in his new religion and artistic style. After his death, the religion of the Aten was quickly abandoned, and the subsequent pharaohs erased all mention of Akhenaten's Egyptian heresy, now known as the Amarna Period.

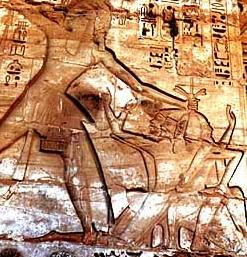
Ramesses II's sea peoples of the Great Karnak Inscription

Ramesses the Great ascended the throne, and went on to build more temples, erect more statues and obelisks, and sire more children than any other pharaoh in history. One of the greatest construction projects conducted by Ramesses was the city of Pi-Ramesses. The city covered an area of 18 km^{2} (as big as Rome). At its peak, The city was home to a population of 160,000-300,000. This would make Pi-Ramesses 2-4 times bigger than Yinxu (Second largest city at that time). Ramesses led his army against the Hittites in the Battle of Kadesh and, after fighting to a stalemate, finally agreed to the first recorded peace treaty. Egypt's wealth, however, made it a tempting target for invasion, particularly by the Libyans and the Sea Peoples. Initially, the military was able to repel these invasions during the reign of Ramesses III, but Egypt eventually lost control of Syria and Palestine. The impact of external threats was exacerbated by internal problems such as corruption, tomb robbery and civil unrest. The high priests at the temple of Amun in Thebes accumulated vast tracts of land and wealth, and their growing power splintered the country during the Third Intermediate Period.

=== Third Intermediate Period ===
The Third Intermediate Period of Ancient Egypt began with the death of Pharaoh Ramesses XI in 1070 BC, ending the New Kingdom, and was eventually followed by the Late Period. Various points are offered as the beginning for the latter era, though it is most often regarded as dating from the foundation of the Twenty-Sixth Dynasty by Psamtik I in 664 BC.

The first Dynasty of the Ancient Egyptian Third Intermediate Period is the Twenty-first Dynasty. Its first ruler is king Smendes who ruled only in Lower Egypt. The most powerful pharaohs of the Twenty-first dynasty were psusennes I and Siamun who built extensively compared to the other pharaohs of the dynasty. The Pharaohs of the Twenty-first Dynasty transported all the old Ramesside temples, obelisks, stelae, statues and sphinxes from Pi-Ramesses to the new capital Tanis. The obelisks and statues, the largest weighing over 200 tons, were transported in one piece while major buildings were dismantled into sections and reassembled at Tanis.

The country was firmly reunited by the Twenty-Second Dynasty founded by Shoshenq I in 945 BC (or 943 BC), who descended from Meshwesh immigrants, originally from Ancient Libya. Upon unifying Egypt, king Shoshenq I started campaigning in the Levante. This brought stability to the country for well over a century and made Egypt a superpower again, but after the reign of Osorkon II, particularly, the country had effectively split into two states, with Shoshenq III of the Twenty-Second Dynasty controlling Lower Egypt by 818 BC while Takelot II and his son Osorkon (the future Osorkon III) ruled Middle and Upper Egypt.

=== Late Period ===
The Late Period of ancient Egypt refers to the last flowering of native Egyptian rulers after the Third Intermediate Period beginning with the 26th Saite Dynasty founded by Psamtik I. The 26th Dynasty of Egypt managed to regain Egypt's power for a short time before the Achaemenid conquest of Egypt lad by Cambyses II in 525 BC.

However, the Egyptians managed to gain independence from the Persians during a rebellion led by the rebel Pharaoh Amyrtaeus around 404 B.C who established the Twenty-eighth Dynasty of Egypt. Egypt remained independent during the Twenty-ninth Dynasty and Thirtieth Dynasty until the Persians invaded it again in 343 B.C. During that time, the Egyptians managed to repel several attacks from the Achaemenid Empire. The most famous attack of them occurred in around 351 BC, when Artaxerxes III embarked on a campaign to recover Egypt, which had revolted under his father, Artaxerxes II. Levying a vast army, Artaxerxes marched into Egypt, and engaged Nectanebo II the founder of the Thirtieth Dynasty of Egypt. After a year of fighting the Egyptian Pharaoh, Nectanebo inflicted a crushing defeat on the Persians with the support of mercenaries led by the Greek generals Diophantus and Lamius. Artaxerxes successfully reconquered Egypt in 340 or 339 B.C.

The Late period of ancient Egypt ends when Alexander the Great took Egypt from the Persians without war around 332 B.C.

=== Legacy ===
The many achievements of the ancient Egyptians include the quarrying, surveying and construction techniques that facilitated the building of monumental pyramids, temples, and obelisks; a system of mathematics, a practical and effective system of medicine, irrigation systems and agricultural production techniques, the first known ships, Egyptian faience and glass technology, new forms of literature, and the earliest known peace treaty. Egypt left a lasting legacy. Its art and architecture were widely copied, and its antiquities carried off to far corners of the world. Its monumental ruins have inspired the imaginations of travellers and writers for centuries. A new-found respect for antiquities and excavations in the early modern period led to the scientific investigation of Egyptian civilization and a greater appreciation of its cultural legacy, for Egypt and the world.

== Ancient India ==
Several Indian empires including Maurya Empire and Gupta Empire were able to expand across southern Asia, incorporating much of the region, as well as beyond. The subcontinent was conquered by the Mauryan Empire during the 4th and 3rd centuries BC. Various parts of India was ruled by numerous Middle kingdoms for the next 1,500 years, among which the Gupta Empire united India in the 4th and 5th century CE. Southern India saw the rule of the Chalukyas, Cholas, Pallavas, Pandyas and Cheras. This period, witnessing a Hindu religious and intellectual resurgence, is known as the classical or "Golden Age of India". During this period, aspects of Indian civilisation, administration, culture, and religion (Hinduism and Buddhism) spread to much of Asia, while kingdoms in Southern India had maritime business links with the Roman Empire from around 77 AD.

=== Maurya Empire ===
Maurya Empire

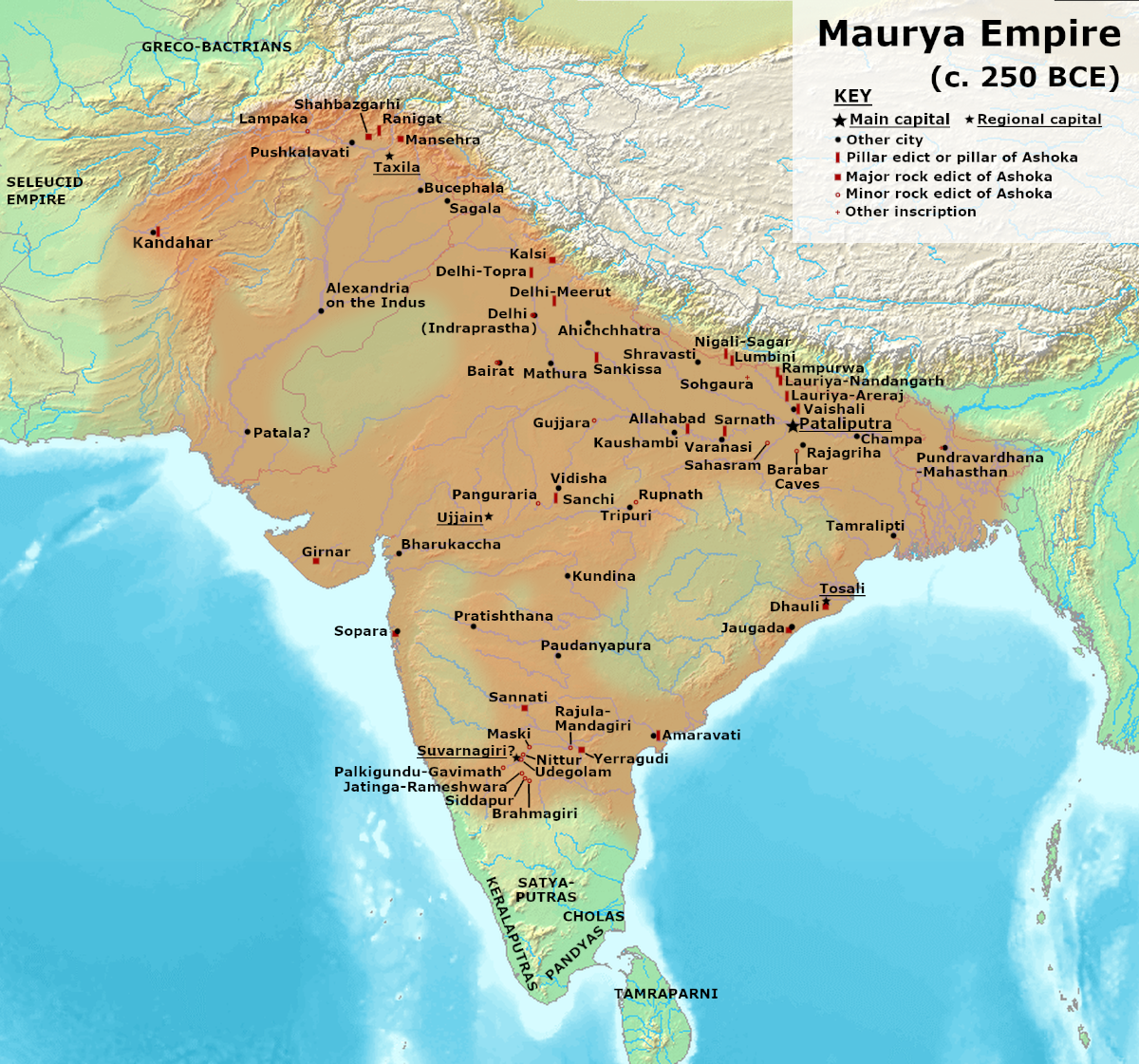
Maurya Empire at its greatest extent under Ashoka the Great, conceptualized as a network of core regions connected by networks of communication and trade, with large areas with peripheral or no Maurya control. (Note: See note on Mauryan Empire.)

The Mauryan Empire was the first political entity to unite India and expand into Central Asia. Its cultural influence also extended west into Egypt and Syria, and east into Thailand, China and Burma.

The Empire was founded in 322 BC by Chandragupta Maurya. Chandragupta waged a war against the nearby Greek powers and won, forcing the Greeks to surrender large amounts of land. Under the reign of Ashoka the Great, the empire turned to spreading its soft power in the form of Buddhism.

Spread of Buddhism to the West during the reign of Maurya Empire

The Empire was divided into four provinces, which one of the four, look like a giant crescents. with the imperial capital at Pataliputra. From Ashokan edicts, the names of the four provincial capitals are Tosali (in the east), Ujjain in the west, Suvarnagiri (in the south), and Taxila (in the north). The head of the provincial administration was the Kumara (royal prince), who governed the provinces as king's representative. The kumara was assisted by Mahamatyas and council of ministers. This organizational structure was reflected at the imperial level with the Emperor and his Mantriparishad (Council of Ministers).

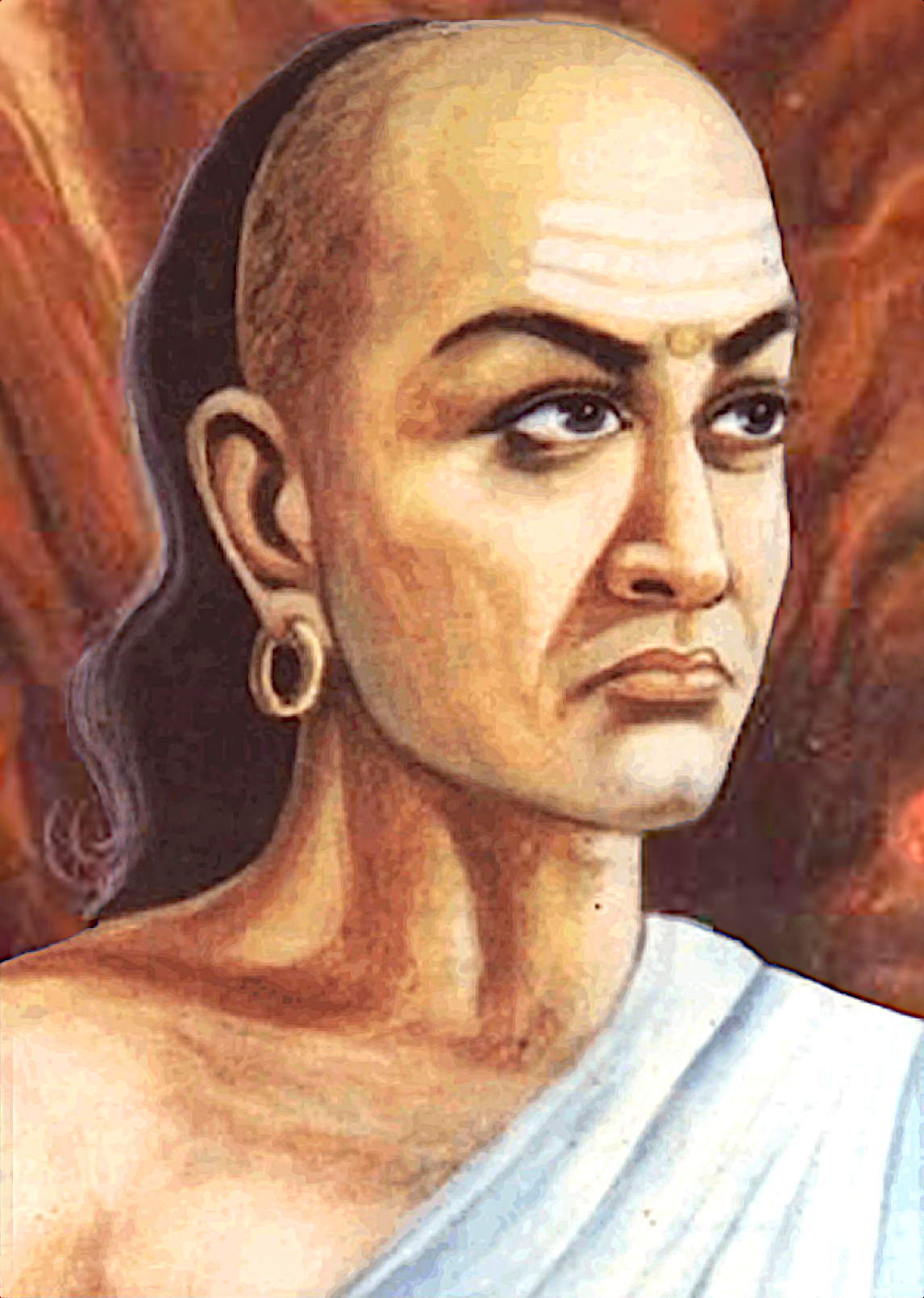
Chanakya, semi-legendary adviser and prime minister of Chandragupta Maurya

Historians theorize that the organization of the Empire was in line with the extensive bureaucracy described by Kautilya in the Arthashastra: a sophisticated civil service governed everything from municipal hygiene to international trade. According to Megasthenes, the empire wielded a military of 600,000 infantry, 30,000 cavalry, and 9,000 war elephants. A vast espionage system collected intelligence for both internal and external security purposes. Having renounced offensive warfare and expansionism, Ashoka nevertheless continued to maintain this large army, to protect the Empire and instill stability and peace across South Asia.

=== Gupta Empire ===
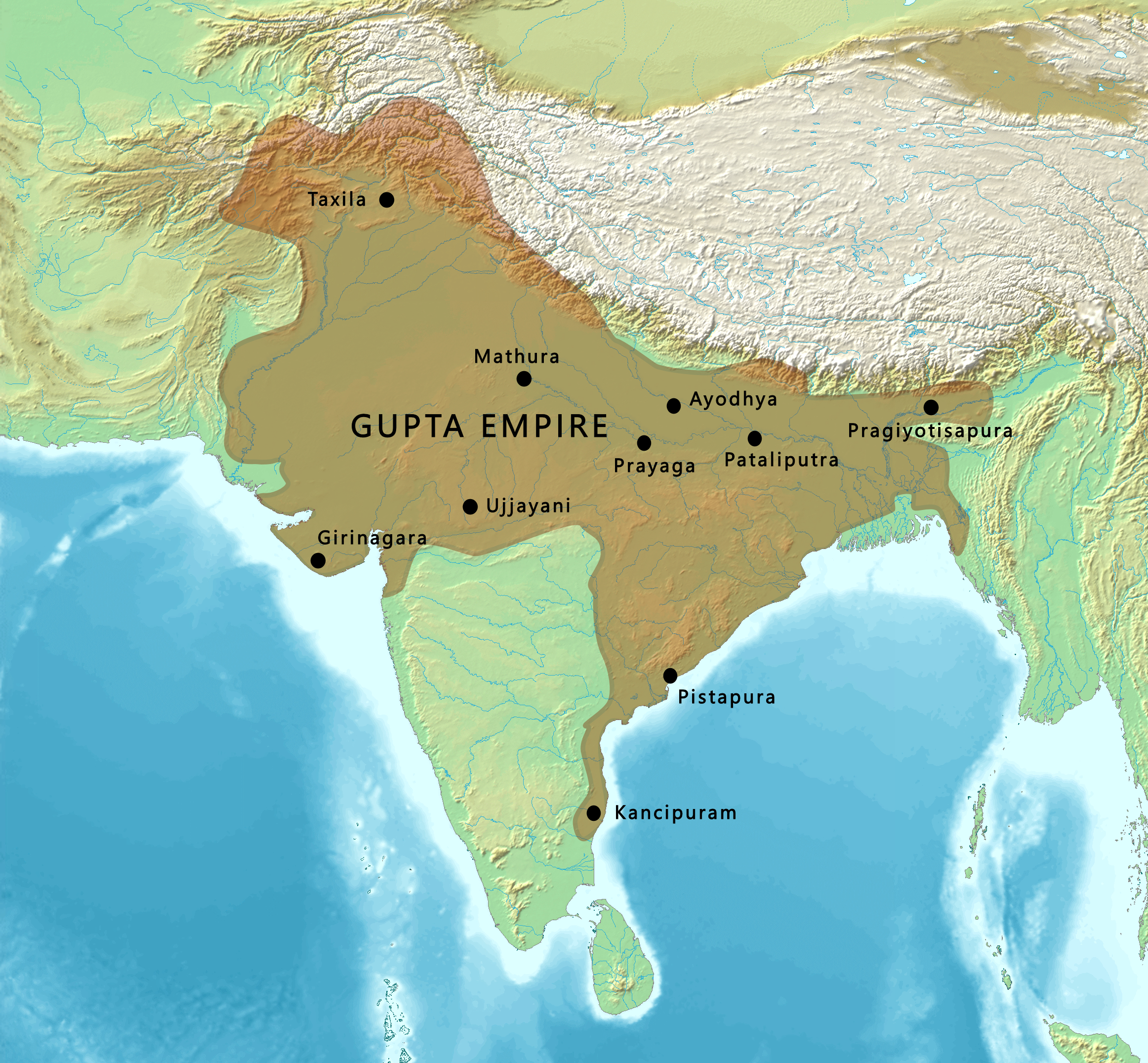
Gupta Empire and its tributaries

In the 4th and 5th centuries, the Gupta Empire unified India. This period is called the Golden Age of India and was marked by extensive achievements in science, technology, engineering, art, literature, logic, mathematics, astronomy, religion and philosophy that crystallized the elements of what is generally known as Indian culture. Chandragupta I, Samudragupta, and Chandragupta II were the most notable rulers of the Gupta dynasty.

The high points of this cultural creativity are magnificent architectures, sculptures and paintings. The Gupta period produced scholars such as Kalidasa, Aryabhata, Varahamihira, Vishnu Sharma, and Vatsyayana who made great advancements in many academic fields. Science and political administration reached new heights during the Gupta era. Strong trade ties also made the region an important cultural center and set the region up as a base that would influence nearby kingdoms and regions in Burma, Sri Lanka, Indonesian Archipelago and Indochina.

== Ancient China ==
=== Shang dynasty ===
The Shang dynasty (Chinese: 商朝; pinyin: Shāng cháo) or Yin dynasty (Chinese: 殷代; pinyin: Yīn dài), according to traditional historiography, ruled in the Yellow River valley in the second millennium BC, succeeding the Xia dynasty and followed by the Zhou dynasty. The classic account of the Shang comes from texts such as the Classic of History, Bamboo Annals and Records of the Grand Historian. According to the traditional chronology based upon calculations made approximately 2,000 years ago by Liu Xin, the Shang ruled from 1766 BC to 1122 BC, but according to the chronology based upon the "current text" of Bamboo Annals, they ruled from 1556 BC to 1046 BC. The Xia–Shang–Zhou Chronology Project dated them from c. 1600 BC to 1046 BC. At its peak 1122 BC it covered an area of 1,250,000 km^{2}.

=== Zhou dynasty ===
The Zhou dynasty (c. 1046–256 BC; Chinese: 周朝; pinyin: Zhōu Cháo; Wade–Giles: Chou^{¹} Ch'ao^{²} [tʂóʊ tʂʰɑ̌ʊ]) was a Chinese dynasty that followed the Shang dynasty and preceded the Qin dynasty. Although the Zhou dynasty lasted longer than any other dynasty in Chinese history, the actual political and military control of China by the dynasty, surnamed Ji (Chinese: 姬), lasted only until 771 BC, a period known as the Western Zhou.

This period of Chinese history produced what many consider the zenith of Chinese bronze-ware making. The dynasty also spans the period in which the written script evolved into its modern form with the use of an archaic clerical script that emerged during the late Warring States period.

=== Qin dynasty ===
Qin Dynasty

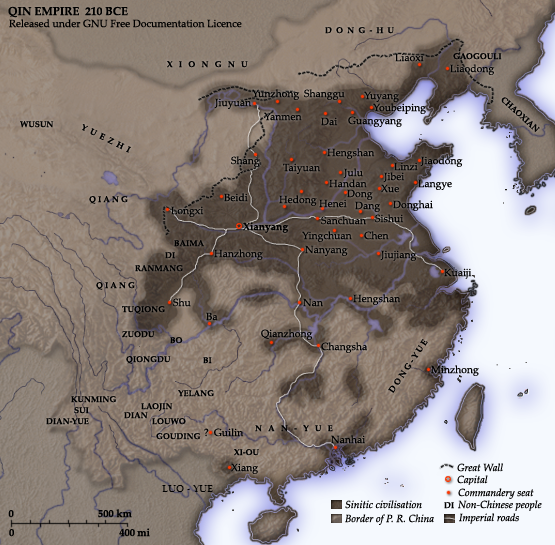
Qin Empire in 210 BC Qin region Outlying regions

The Qin dynasty was preceded by the feudal Zhou dynasty and followed by the Han dynasty in China. The unification of China in 221 BC under the First Emperor Qin Shi Huang marked the beginning of Imperial China, a period which lasted until the fall of the Qing dynasty in 1912.

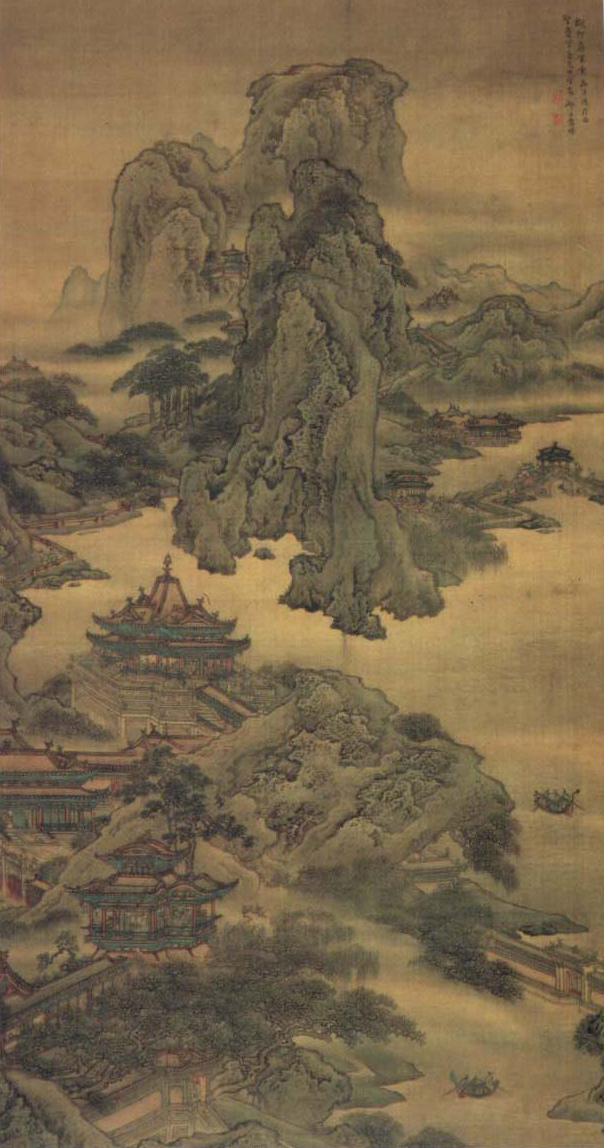
Epang Palace

In 214 BC Qin Shihuang secured his boundaries to the north with a fraction (100,000 men) of his large army, and sent the majority (500,000 men) south to seize still more land. Prior to the events leading to Qin dominance over China, they had gained possession of much of Sichuan to the southwest. The Qin army was unfamiliar with the jungle terrain, and it was defeated by the southern tribes' guerrilla warfare tactics with over 100,000 men lost. However, in the defeat Qin was successful in building a canal to the south, which they used heavily for supplying and reinforcing their troops during their second attack to the south. Building on these gains, the Qin armies conquered the coastal lands surrounding Guangzhou, and took the provinces of Fuzhou and Guilin. They struck as far south as Hanoi. After these victories in the south, Qin Shihuang moved over 100,000 prisoners and exiles to colonize the newly conquered area. In terms of extending the boundaries of his empire, the First Emperor was extremely successful in the south.

Despite its military strength, the Qin dynasty did not last long. When the first emperor died in 210 BC, his son was placed on the throne by two of the previous emperor's advisers, in an attempt to influence and control the administration of the entire country through him. The advisors squabbled among themselves, however, which resulted in both their deaths and that of the second Qin emperor. Popular revolt broke out a few years later, and the weakened empire soon fell to a Chu lieutenant, who went on to found the Han dynasty. Despite its rapid end, the Qin dynasty influenced future Chinese regimes, particularly the Han, and the European name for China is derived from it.

=== Han dynasty ===
Han Dynasty

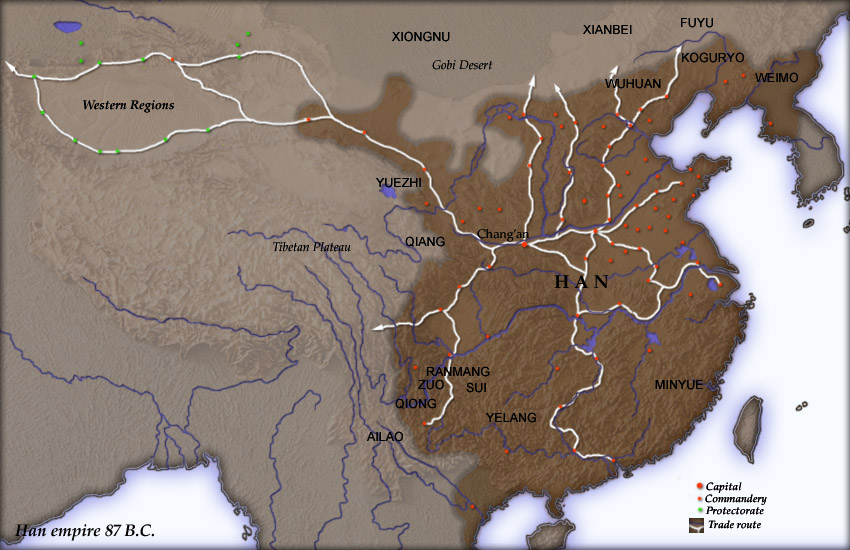
Han Empire in 87 BC Han region Outlying regions

The Han dynasty (202 BC – AD 220), lasting 400 years, is commonly considered within China to be one of the greatest periods in the history of China. At its height, the Han empire extended over a vast territory of 6 million km^{2} and housed a population of approximately 55 million. During this time period, China became a military, economic, and cultural powerhouse. The empire extended its political and cultural influence over Korea, Japan, Mongolia, Vietnam, and Central Asia before it finally collapsed under a combination of domestic and external pressures.

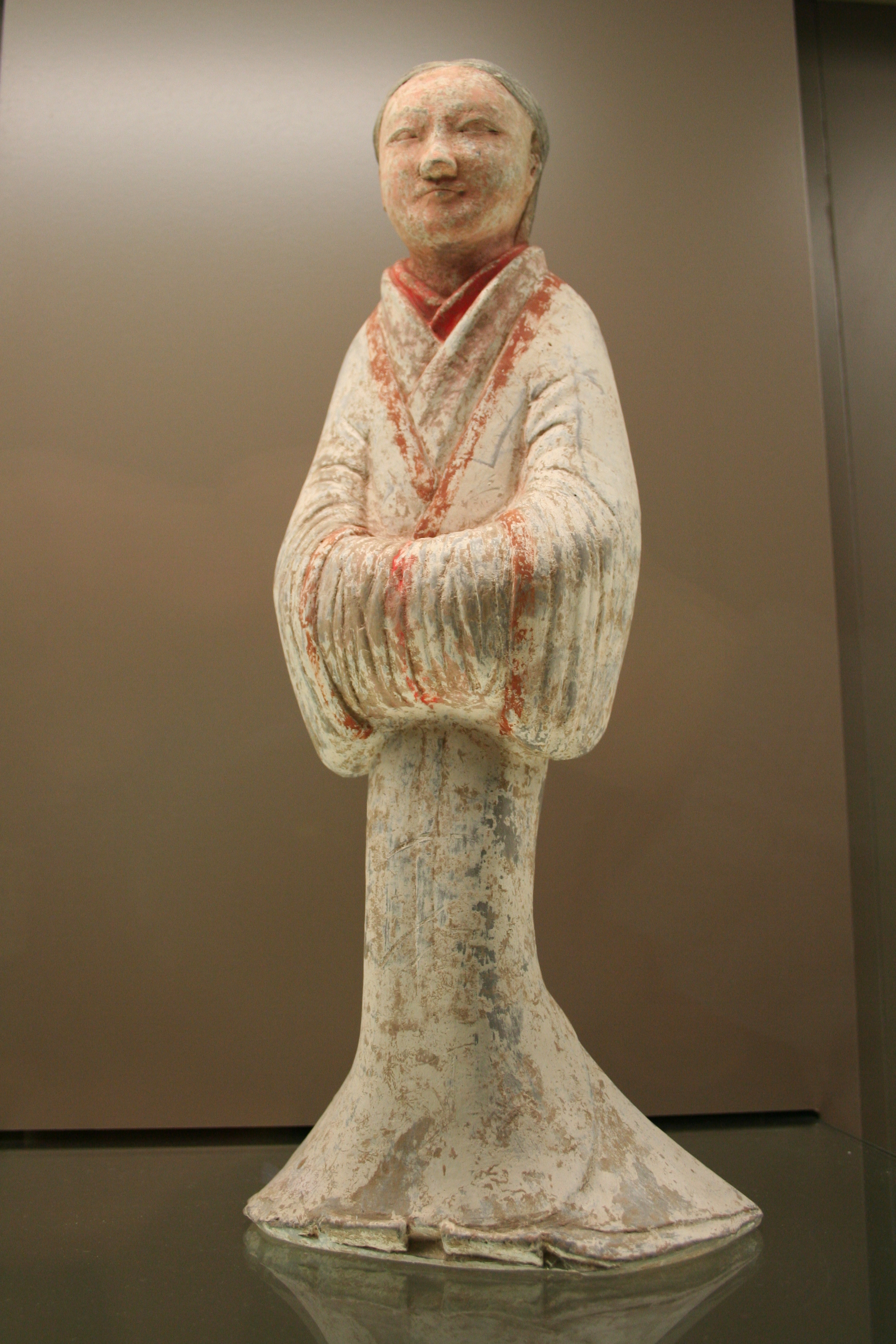
Servant (Shinü Yong). Terra Cotta statue.

The Han Empire was divided into areas directly controlled by the central government, known as commanderies, and a number of semi-autonomous kingdoms. These kingdoms gradually lost all vestiges of their independence, particularly following the Rebellion of the Seven States. The Xiongnu, a nomadic confederation which dominated the eastern Eurasian Steppe, defeated the Han army in battle in 200 BC. Following the defeat, a political marriage alliance was negotiated in which the Han became the de facto inferior partner. When, despite the treaty, the Xiongnu continued to raid Han borders, Emperor Wu of Han (r. 141–87 BC) launched several military campaigns against them. The ultimate Han victory in these wars eventually forced the Xiongnu to accept vassal status as Han tributaries. These campaigns expanded Han sovereignty into the Tarim Basin of Central Asia and helped establish the vast trade network known as the Silk Road, which reached as far as the Mediterranean world. Han forces managed to divide the Xiongnu into two competing nations, the Southern and Northern Xiongnu, and forced the Northern Xiongnu across the Ili River. Despite these victories, the territories north of Han's borders were quickly overrun by the nomadic Xianbei confederation.

=== Jin dynasty ===
The Jin dynasty (simplified Chinese: 晋朝; traditional Chinese: 晉朝; pinyin: Jìn Cháo; Wade–Giles: Chin⁴-ch'ao², IPA: [tɕîn tʂʰɑ̌ʊ];), was a dynasty in Chinese history, lasting between the years 265 and 420 AD. There are two main divisions in the history of the dynasty, the first being Western Jin (西晉, 265–316) and the second Eastern Jin (東晉, 317–420). Western Jin was founded by Sima Yan, with its capital at Luoyang, while Eastern Jin was begun by Sima Rui, with its capital at Jiankang. The two periods are also known as Liang Jin (兩晉; literally: two Jin) and Sima Jin (司馬晉) by scholars, to distinguish this dynasty from other dynasties that use the same Chinese character, such as the Later Jin dynasty (後晉).

== Ancient Europe ==
=== Ancient Greece ===
Magna Graecia ancient colonies

Ancient Greece is the civilization belonging to the period of Greek history lasting from the Archaic period of the 8th to 6th centuries BC to 146 BC and the Roman conquest of Greece after the Battle of Corinth. At the center of this time period is Classical Greece, which flourished during the 5th to 4th centuries BC, at first under Athenian leadership successfully repelling the military threat of Persian invasion. The Athenian Golden Age ends with the defeat of Athens at the hands of Sparta in the Peloponnesian War in 404 BC. Following the conquests of Alexander the Great, Hellenistic civilization flourished from Central Asia to the western end of the Mediterranean Sea. Classical Greek culture had a powerful influence on the Roman Empire, which carried a version of it to many parts of the Mediterranean region and Europe, for which reason Classical Greece is generally considered to be the seminal culture which provided the foundation of Western civilization.

Athens, after a tyranny in the second half of the 6th century, established ancient Europe's first democracy as a radical solution to prevent the aristocracy from regaining power. A citizens' assembly (the Ecclesia), for the discussion of city policy, had existed since the reforms of Draco; all citizens were permitted to attend after the reforms of Solon, but the poorest citizens could not address the assembly or run for office. With the establishment of the democracy, the assembly became the de jure mechanism of government; all citizens had equal privileges in the assembly. However, non-citizens, foreigners living in Athens, slaves and women had no political rights at all. After the rise of the democracy in Athens, other city-states founded democracies. However, many retained more traditional forms of government. As so often in other matters, Sparta was a notable exception to the rest of Greece, ruled through the whole period by not one, but two hereditary monarchs. This was a form of diarchy.

==== Athens ====
Ancient Athens

Map of Ancient Greece in 431 BC

Ancient Athens was inhabited around 3,000 years ago. Athens has one of the longest histories of any city in Europe and in the world. It became the leading city of Ancient Greece in the first millennium BC. Its cultural achievements during the 5th century BC laid the foundations of western civilization. During the Middle Ages, Athens experienced decline and then a recovery under the Byzantine Empire. Athens was relatively prosperous during the Crusades, benefiting from medieval Italian trade.

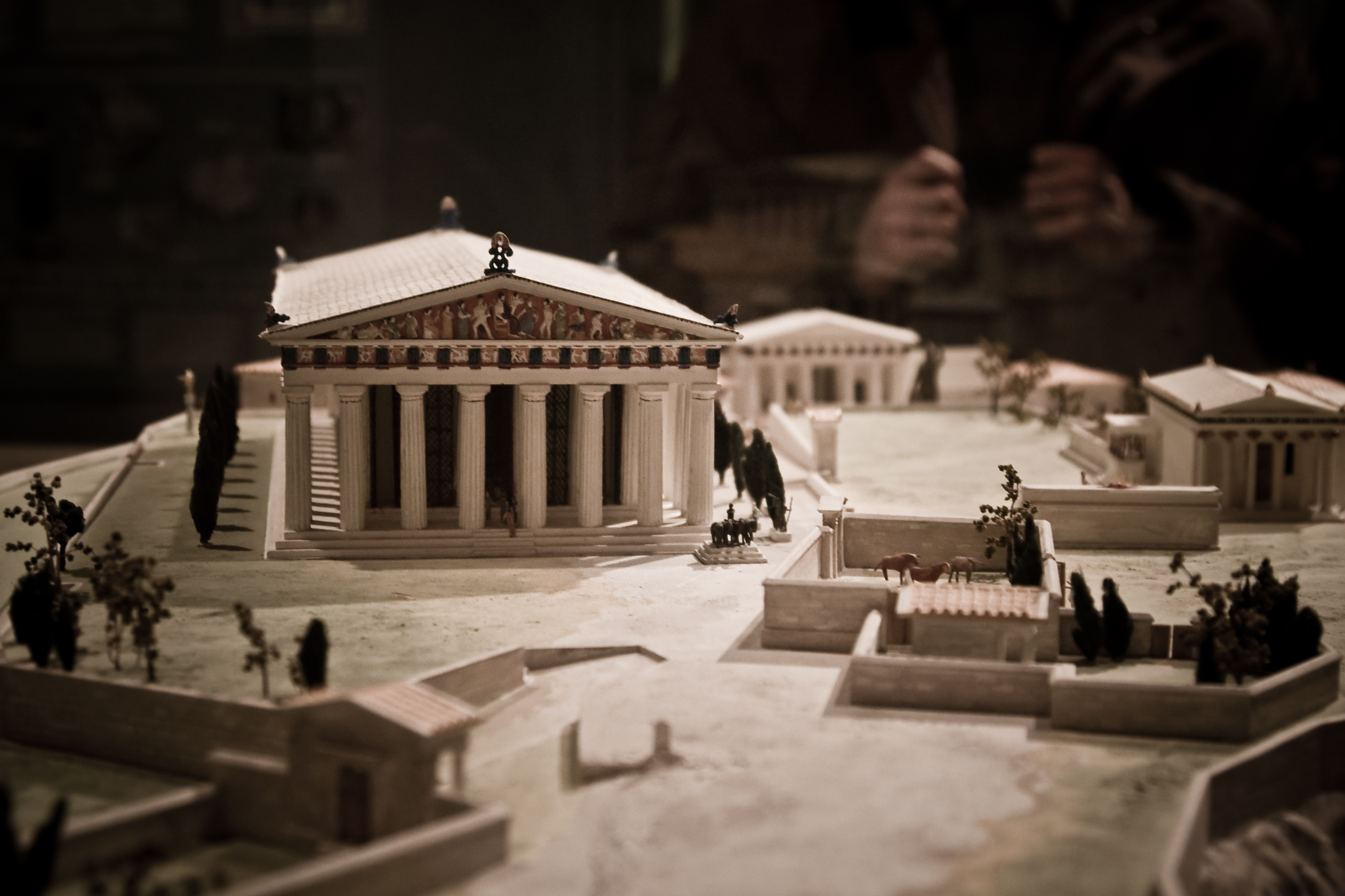
Acropolis of Athens (architectural model)

Fifth-century Athens refers to the Greek city-state Athens in the period of roughly 480 BC-404 BC. This was a period of Athenian political hegemony, economic growth and cultural flourishing known as the Golden Age of Athens or Age of Pericles. The period began in 480 BC when an Athenian-led coalition of city-states, known as the Delian League, defeated the Persians at Salamis. As the fifth century wore on, what started as an alliance of independent city-states gradually became an Athenian empire. Eventually, Athens abandoned the pretense of parity among its allies and relocated the Delian League treasury from Delos to Athens, where it funded the building of the Athenian Acropolis. With its enemies under its feet and its political fortunes guided by legendary statesman and orator Pericles, Athens as a center of literature, philosophy (see Greek philosophy) and the arts (see Greek theatre). Some of the most important figures of Western cultural and intellectual history lived in Athens during this period: the dramatists Aeschylus, Aristophanes, Euripides and Sophocles, the philosophers Aristotle, Plato and Socrates.

==== Sparta ====
Lacedaemon

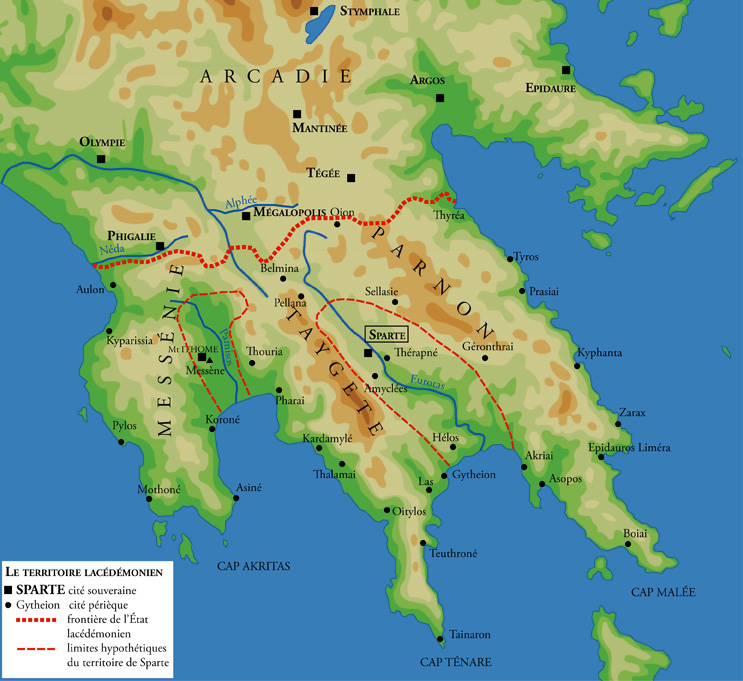
Territory of ancient Sparta

Sparta was a Dorian Greek military state, originally centered in Laconia. As a city-state devoted to military training, Sparta possessed the most formidable army in the Greek world, and after achieving notable victories over the Athenian and Persian Empires, regarded itself as the natural protector of Greece. Laconia or Lacedaemon (Λακεδαίμων) was the name of the wider city-state centered at the city of Sparta, though the name "Sparta" is now used for both.

Following the victories in the Messenian Wars (631 BC), Sparta's reputation as a land-fighting force was unequaled. In 480 BC a small Spartan unit under King Leonidas made a legendary last stand against a massive, invading Persian army at the Battle of Thermopylae. One year later, Sparta assembled at full strength and led a Greek alliance against the Persians at Plataea. There, a decisive Greek victory put an end to the Greco-Persian War along with Persian ambition of expanding into Europe. Even though this war was won by a pan-Hellenic army, credit was given to Sparta, who, besides being the protagonist at Thermopylae and Plataea, had been the nominal leader of the entire Greek expedition.

In later Classical times, Sparta along with Athens, Thebes and Persia had been the main regional powers fighting for supremacy against each other. As a result of the Peloponnesian War, Sparta, a traditionally continental culture, became a naval power. At the peak of her power, she subdued many of the key Greek states and even managed to overpower the powerful Athenian navy. By the end of the 5th century, she stood out as a state which had defeated at war both the Persian and Athenian Empires, a period which marks the Spartan Hegemony.

Sparta was, above all, a militarist state, and emphasis on military fitness began virtually at birth.

==== Thebes ====
Thebes

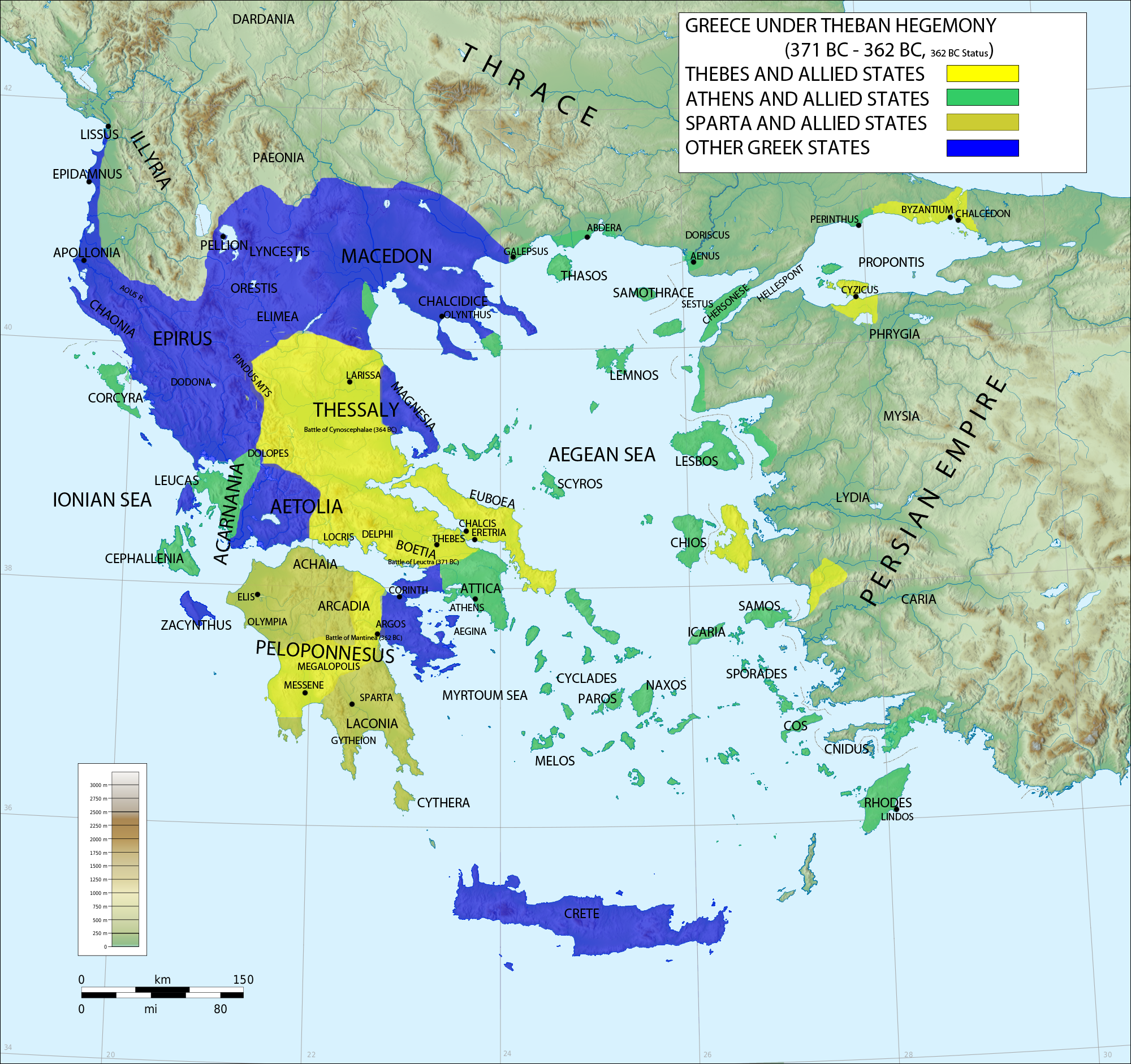

Thebes was an Aeolean city-state located in Boeotia. During the First Peloponnesian War and the Second Peloponnesian war, Thebes created and expanded the Boeotian league. Thebes experienced a decline during the first quarter of the 4th century BC - the Boeotian league was disbanded in the aftermath of the Corinthian War (395–387), while the First Olynthian War (382–379) saw the theban democratic government get replaced by a spartan supported oligarchy. Pelopidas and Gorgidas- leaders of the democratic movement - came back in the government via a coup in 378 BC, which triggered the Theban-Spartan War. Epaminondas, the leader of the city and a Boeotarch beat the spartan army at leuctra in 371 BC and became the hegemon of Greece, reconquering all of Boeotia, influencing thessaly, breaking up the Peloponnesian League, establishing the Arcadian league, freeing Messenia from Spartan dominance and severing the main economic roots of Sparta by freeing Messenian Helots. Theban dominance over Greece weakened after Pelopidas's death at the Battle of Cynoscephalae and ended in 362 BC at the Battle of Mantinea (362 BC) where, despite Theban victory over the combined forces of Athens, Sparta, Corinthians, Achaean city-states, Elis and other cities, Epaminondas died. Thebes further weakened after a war with Phocis and was subjugated by Phillip II of Macedon, who forcefully joined the city-state in the League of Corinth. Thebes revolted against Alexander the Great, but was captured by Alexander who razed the city and destroyed every single building except the house of Pindar and the Cadmea.

=== Macedonia ===
Macedon

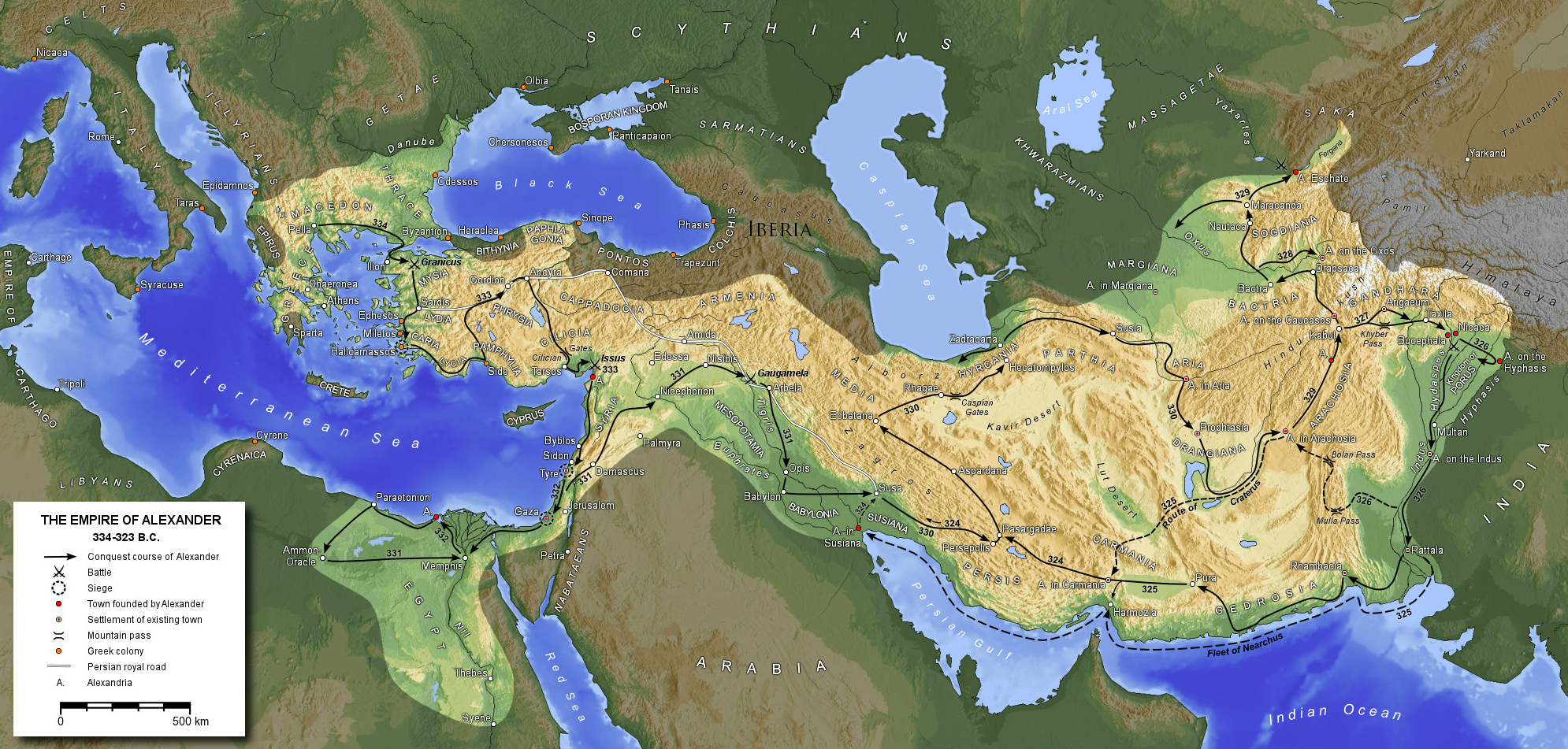
Map of Alexander the Great's empire

Macedonia was the name of an ancient kingdom in the northernmost part of ancient Greece, bordering Epirus to the west and the ancient Thracian Odrysian kingdom to the east. For a brief period it became the most powerful state in the world after Alexander the Great conquered most of the known world, including the entire Achaemenid Empire, inaugurating the Hellenistic period of Greek history.

The rise of Macedon, from a small kingdom at the periphery of Classical Greek affairs, to one which came to dominate the entire Hellenic world (and beyond), occurred in the space of just 25 years, between 359 and 336 BC. This ascendancy is largely attributable to the personality and policies of Philip II of Macedon. Philip's military skills and expansionist vision of Macedonian greatness brought him early success. He had however first to re-establish a situation which had been greatly worsened by the defeat against the Illyrians in which King Perdiccas himself had died. The Paionians and the Thracians had sacked and invaded the eastern regions of the country, while the Athenians had landed, at Methoni on the coast, a contingent under a Macedonian pretender called Argeus. Using diplomacy, Philip pushed back Paionians and Thracians promising tributes, and crushed the 3,000 Athenian hoplites (359). Momentarily free from his opponents, he concentrated on strengthening his internal position and, above all, his army. His most important innovation was doubtless the introduction of the phalanx infantry corps, armed with the famous sarissa, an exceedingly long spear, at the time the most important army corps in Macedonia.

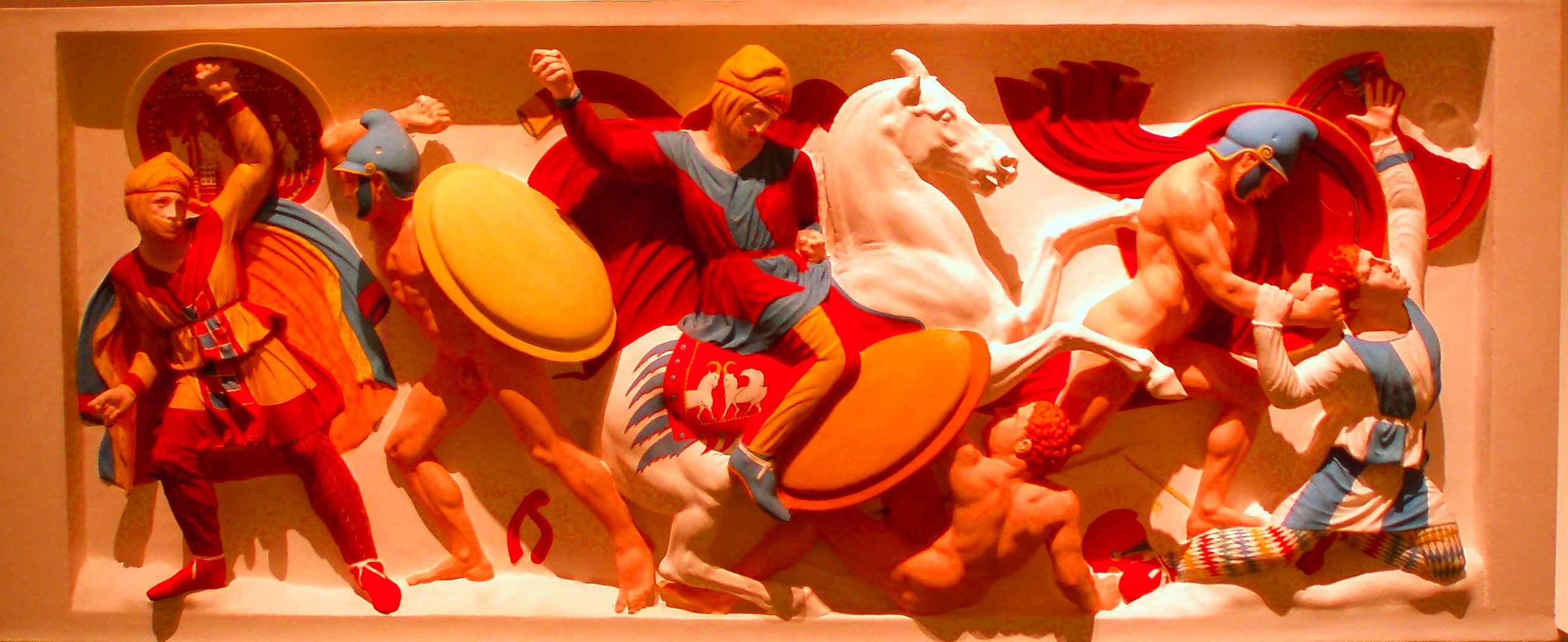
Polychrome decoration of the Alexander Sarcophagus

Philip's son, Alexander the Great, managed to briefly extend Macedonian power not only over the central Greek city-states, but also to the Persian empire, including Egypt and lands as far east as the fringes of India. Alexander's adoption of the styles of government of the conquered territories was accompanied by the spread of Greek culture and learning through his vast empire. Although the empire fractured into multiple Hellenic regimes shortly after his death, his conquests left a lasting legacy, not least in the new Greek-speaking cities founded across Persia's western territories, heralding the Hellenistic period. In the partition of Alexander's empire among the Diadochi, Macedonia fell to the Antipatrid dynasty, which was overthrown by the Antigonid dynasty after only a few years.

=== Hellenistic states ===
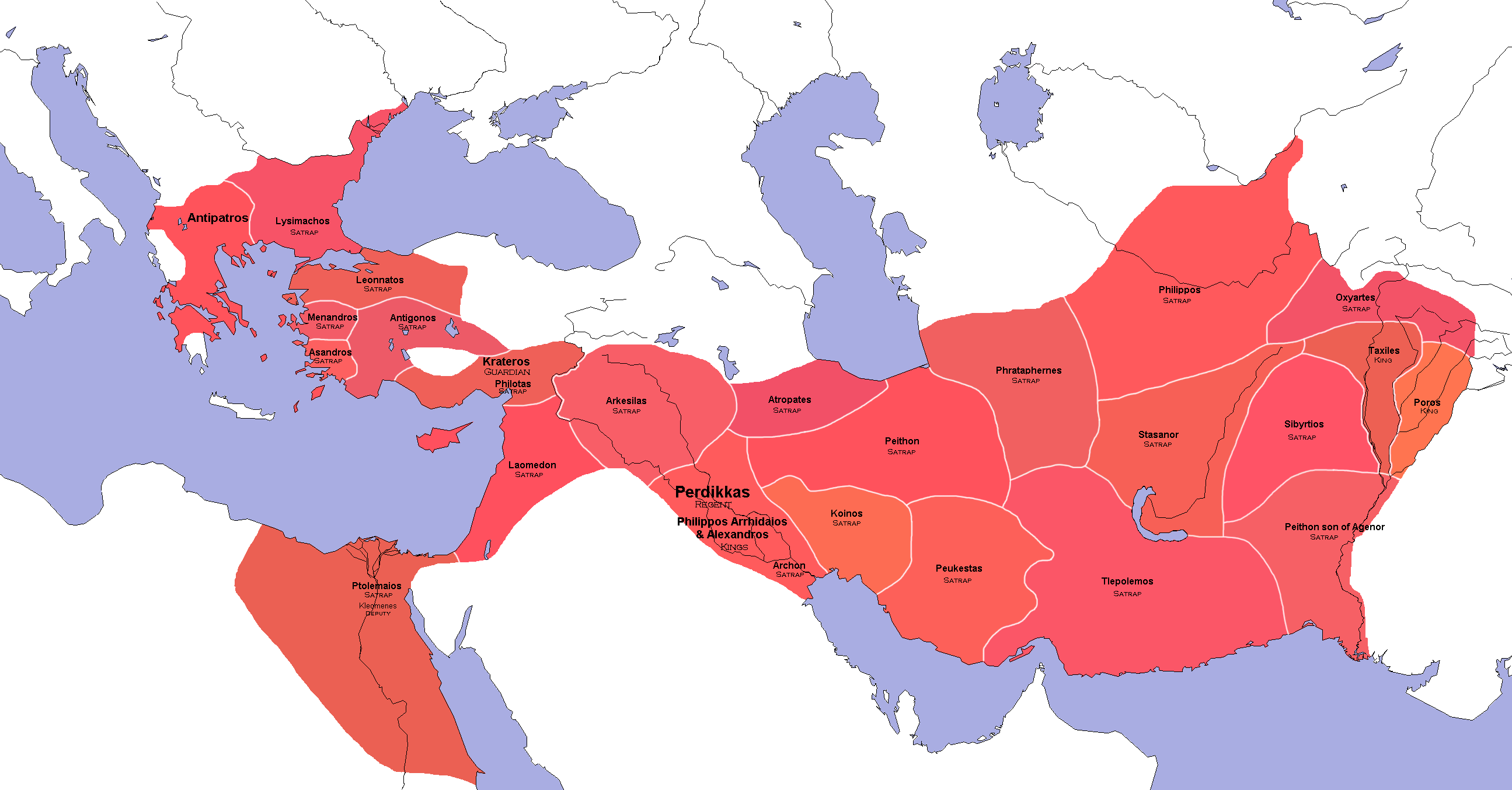
The distribution of satrapies in the Macedonian empire after the Partition of Babylon Hellenistic civilization Antigony · Ptolemy · Seleucidae · Attaly

Alexander had made no special preparations for his succession in his newly founded empire and the Apocrypha of his death state that on his death-bed he willed it to those that performed actions well and powerfully. The result was the wars of the Diadochi between his generals (the Diadochi, or 'Successors'), which lasted for forty years before a more-or-less stable arrangement was established, consisting of four major domains:

- The Antigonid dynasty in Macedon and central Greece;
- The Ptolemaic dynasty in Egypt based at Alexandria;
- The Seleucid dynasty in Syria and Mesopotamia based at Antioch;
- The Attalid dynasty in Anatolia based at Pergamum.

A further two kingdoms later emerged, the so-called Greco-Bactrian and Indo-Greek kingdom. Hellenistic culture thrived in its preservation of the past. The states of the Hellenistic period were deeply fixated with the past and its seemingly lost glories. Athens retained its position as the most prestigious seat of higher education, especially in the domains of philosophy and rhetoric, with considerable libraries. Alexandria was a center of Greek learning and the Library of Alexandria had 700,000 volumes. The city of Pergamon became a major center of book production, possessing a library of some 200,000 volumes, second only to Alexandria's. The island of Rhodes boasted a famous finishing school for politics and diplomacy. Antioch was founded as a metropolis and center of Greek learning which retained its status into the era of Christianity. Seleucia replaced Babylon as the metropolis of the lower Tigris.

=== Ancient Rome and the Roman Empire ===
Roman Empire

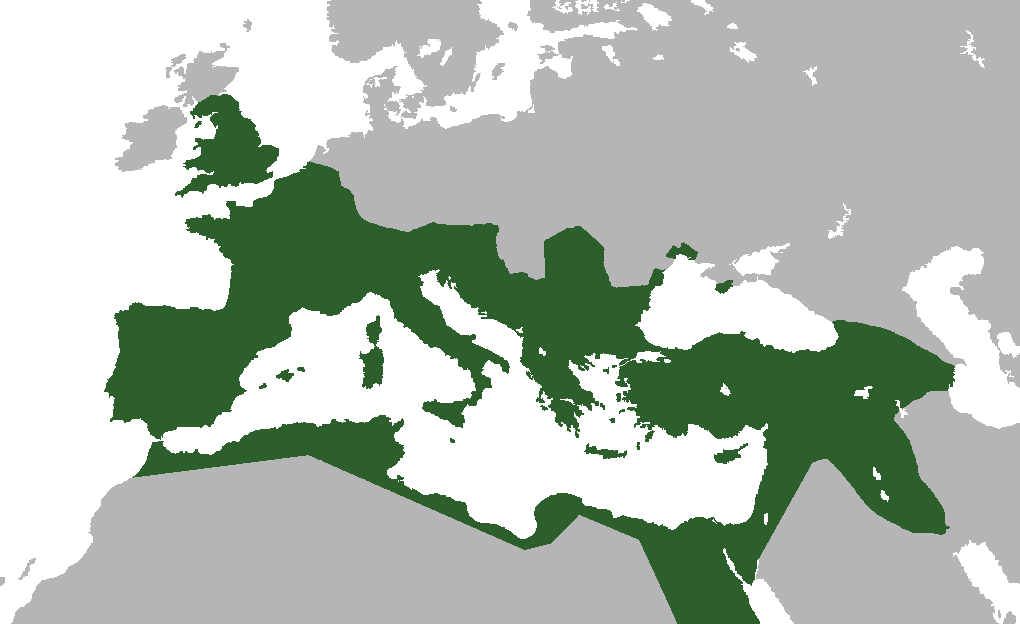
The Roman Empire under Trajan in 117 AD, at the peak of its territorial power

Ancient Rome is widely known as ancient Europe's largest and most powerful civilization. After the Second Punic War Rome was already one of the biggest empires on the planet but its expansion continued with the invasions of Greece, Asia Minor and later Gaul. By 27 BC Rome had control over half of Europe as well as Northern Africa and large amounts of the Middle East. Rome also had a developed culture, building on the earlier Greek culture. From the time of Augustus to the Fall of the Western Empire, Rome dominated Western Eurasia, comprising the majority of its population.

Roman expansion began long before the state was transformed into a de facto monarchy and reached its zenith under emperor Trajan with the conquest of Mesopotamia and Armenia from 113 to 117. The period of the "Five Good Emperors" saw a successions of peaceful years and the Empire was prosperous. Each emperor of this period was adopted by his predecessor. The Nerva–Antonine dynasty was a dynasty of seven consecutive Roman Emperors who ruled over the Roman Empire from 96 to 192. These Emperors are Nerva, Trajan, Hadrian, Antoninus Pius, Marcus Aurelius, Lucius Verus, and Commodus.

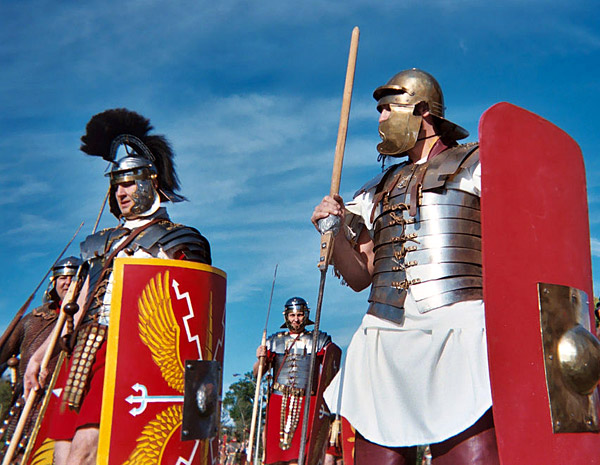
Roman army soldiers (historical reenactment)

The last two of the "Five Good Emperors" and Commodus are also called Antonines. After his accession, Nerva, who succeeded Domitian, set a new tone: he restored much confiscated property and involved the Roman Senate in his rule. Starting in 101, Trajan undertook two military campaigns against the gold rich Dacia, which he finally conquered in 106 (see Trajan's Dacian Wars). In 112, Trajan marched on Armenia and annexed it to the Roman Empire. Then he turned south into Parthia, taking several cities before declaring Mesopotamia a new province of the empire, and lamenting that he was too old to follow in the steps of Alexander the Great. During his rule, the Roman Empire expanded to its largest extent, and would never again advance so far to the east. Hadrian's reign was marked by a general lack of major military conflicts, but he decided to defend the vast territories that Trajan had acquired.

At its territorial peak in the year 117, the Roman Empire controlled approximately 5,000,000 km^{2} (1,900,000 mi^{2}) of land surface. After Trajans reign the Empire continued to grow stronger until the reign of Marcus Aurelius. After the death of Marcus Aurelius his son, Commodus would take power. The reign of Commodus marked the beginning of the decline of the Roman Empire . Ancient Rome's influence upon the culture, law, technology, arts, language, religion, government, military, and architecture of Western civilization continues to this day even outside Latin countries . It would fall to Odoacer in 476, but its eastern half will still be alive until it fell in 1453.

=== Thracian States ===
The Odrysian Kingdom proper was a Thracian kingdom that existed from the early 5th century BC at least until the mid-3rd century BC. It consisted mainly of present-day Bulgaria and parts of Southeastern Romania (Northern Dobruja), Northern Greece and European Turkey. Dominated by the eponymous Odrysian people, it was the largest and most powerful Thracian realm and the first larger political entity of the eastern Balkans. Before the foundation of Seuthopolis in the late 4th century it had no fixed capital.

The Odrysian kingdom was founded by king Teres I, exploiting the collapse of the Persian presence in Europe due to failed invasion of Greece in 480-79. Teres and his son Sitalces pursued a policy of expansion, making the kingdom one of the most powerful of its time. Throughout much of its early history it remained an ally of Athens and even joined the Peloponnesian War on its side. By 400 the state showed first signs of fatigue, although the skilled Cotys I initiated a brief renaissance that lasted until his murder in 360.

The Getae, a northern Thracian people located between the northeastern foothills of the Haemus range and the lower Danube and the Black Sea, had been part of the Odrysian realm since Teres I, even though it is not clear how tightly they were actually incorporated into the state. When and how the Getae became independent is not discussed in the available sources. Perhaps they became independent during the rule of Cotys I or after his death in 360. Rich funeral treasures from the second half of the 4th century, like those of Agighiol, Peretu or Borovo, attest to the increasing wealth of the Getic elite. Several artefacts seem to have originated in the Odrysian kingdom and may well have been prestige gifts.

By the middle of the 4th century, there existed a Getic kingdom that was to thrive for a century. The Getic capital was Helis, which has been identified with the archaeological site of Sboryanovo, which was founded in the 330s or early 320s and housed around 10.000 inhabitants. It seems that the Getae also became active in Muntenia north of the Danube, a region that would come to constitute a part of the "Dacia" of imperial Roman historiography. The first Getic king to appear in the sources was Cothelas, who married his daughter Meda to Philip II, thus concluding an alliance between the two states. This probably happened during or shortly after Philip's conquest of the Odrysians. The kingdom survived two wars with Lysimachus and the Celtic invasion in around 280, but eventually disintegrated a few decades later. Helis/Sboryanovo was completely destroyed by an earthquake in the middle of the 3rd century.

With Alexander's absence in Asia, the Strategoi of Thrace engaged in rebellions and failed expeditions against the Getae, greatly unsettling the country in the process. At the end of the 330s or in the mid-320s (the dating is not entirely clear), a certain Seuthes, later known as Seuthes III, instigated a Thracian rebellion. He seems to have been an Odrysian and may have been associated with the royal house of Cersebleptes, although his social background must remain speculation. Seuthes' goal seems to have been the revival of an independent Odrysian state. Seuthes ruled in the interior, what is Thrace north of the Rhodope Mountains, but not the coastal regions of the Aegean and Black Sea. Probably after the death of Alexander in 323, he founded the capital town of Seuthopolis, on the Tonzos river, near modern Kazanlak, and named after himself.

=== Kingdom of Dacia ===
The Dacian Kingdom reached its greatest territorial extent under Burebista's rule (82BC-44BC). During his rule, he conquered territories from Central Europe to the Balkans, reaching the Aegean Sea. He is well known by the Greek scholars as the "Celtic Slayer", because he defeated and killed many Celtic tribes from the Balkans (Scordisci) and the Central Europe (Boii & Taurisci). In 48BC Burebista tried to influence the Roman politics, during the Roman civil war by allying with Pompey Magnus against the victorious Julius Caesar. But Pompey was defeated and later killed in Ptolemaic Egypt. After all of that, Julius Caesar viewed Burebista's Empire as a threat and he planned to invade it along with the Parthian Empire. But he was assassinated in 44 BC. Burebista's state collapsed into various kingdoms. It will never be unified until Decebalus becomes the last King in 87AD.

The Thracian kingdom, also known as the Sapaean kingdom, was the continuation of the Thracian state from the middle of the 1st century BC to 46 AD. It was dominated by the Sapaean tribe, who ruled from their capital Bizye in what is now northwestern Turkey. Initially only of limited relevance, its power grew significantly after the battle of Actium in 31 BC, when Emperor Augustus installed a new dynasty that proved to be highly loyal and expansive. Conquering and ruling much of Thrace on Roman behalf, it lasted until 46 AD, when Emperor Claudius annexed the kingdom and made Thrace a Roman province.

=== Seleucid Empire ===
Seleucid Empire

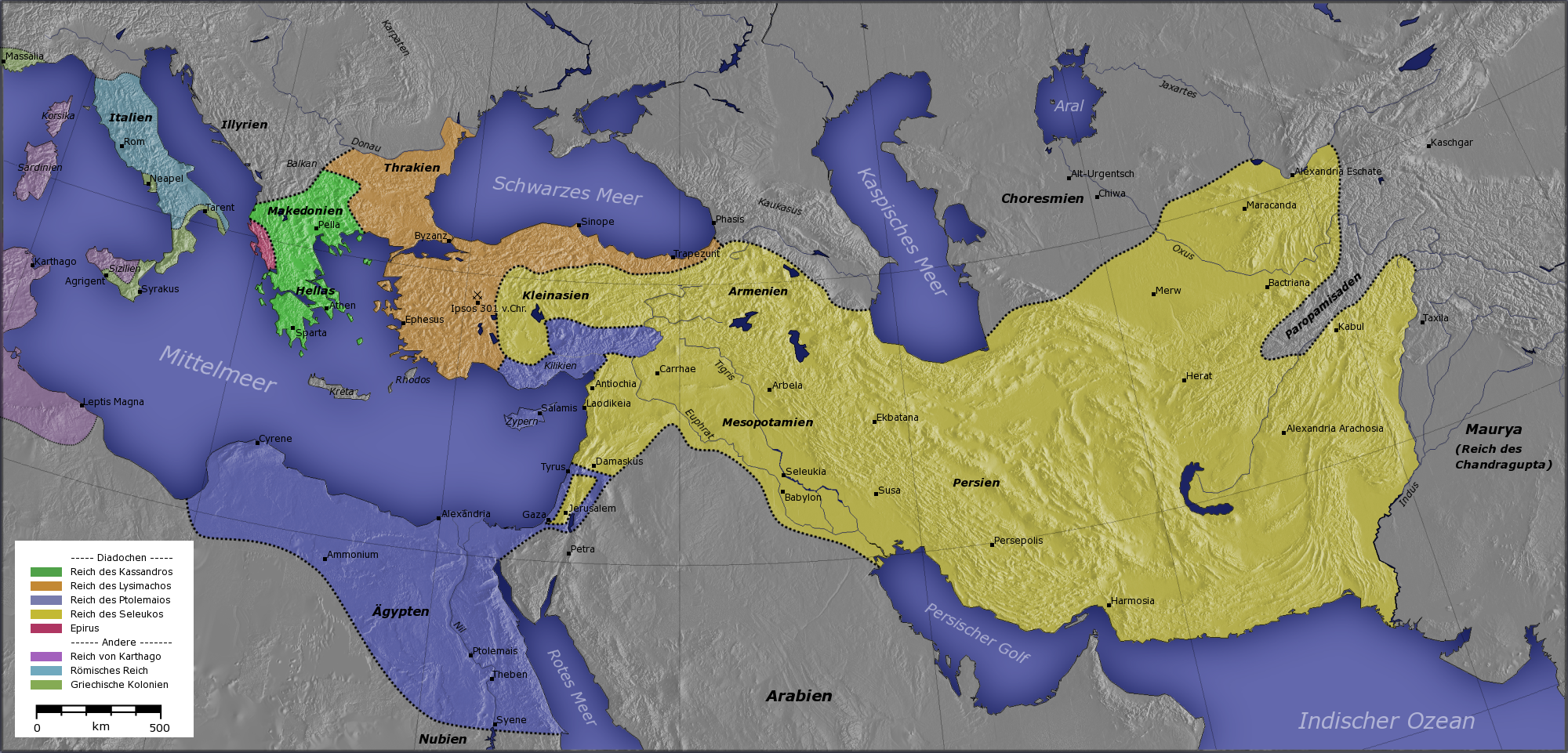
Seleucid Empire amongst other Hellenistic kingdoms

The Seleucid Empire was a Hellenistic empire, and the eastern remnant of the former Achaemenid Persian Empire following its breakup after Alexander the Great's invasion. The Seleucid Empire was centered in the near East. It was a center of Hellenistic culture which maintained the Greek customs and Greek-speaking Macedonian elite.

Seleucid expansion into Greece was abruptly halted after decisive defeats at the hands of the Roman army. Much of the eastern part of the empire was conquered by the Parthians under Mithridates I of Parthia in the mid-2nd century BC, yet the Seleucid kings continued to rule a rump state from Syria until the invasion by Armenian king Tigranes the Great and their ultimate overthrow by the Roman general Pompey.

=== Ptolemaic Empire ===
Ptolemaic empire

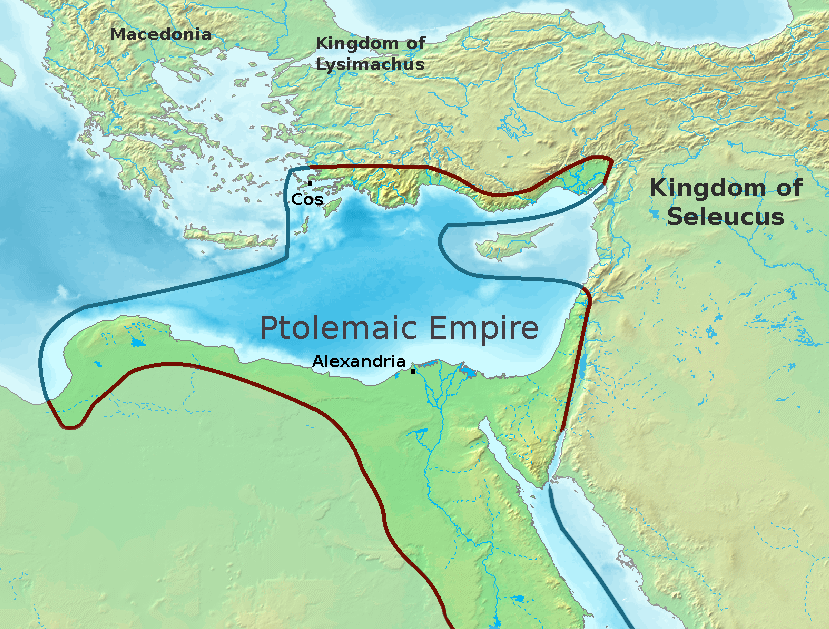
Ptolemaic Empire in 300 BC

The Ptolemaic dynasty, sometimes also known as the Lagids, was a Greek royal family which ruled the Ptolemaic Empire in Egypt during the Hellenistic period.

Ptolemy, one of the seven somatophylakes (bodyguards) who served as Alexander the Great's generals and deputies, was appointed satrap of Egypt after Alexander's death in 323 BC. In 305 BC, he declared himself King Ptolemy I, later known as "Soter" (saviour). The Egyptians soon accepted the Ptolemies as the successors to the pharaohs of independent Egypt. Ptolemy's family ruled Egypt until the Roman conquest of 30 BC. All the male rulers of the dynasty took the name Ptolemy.

Ptolemaic Egypt began when Ptolemy I Soter declared himself Pharaoh of Egypt in 305 BC and ended with the death of queen Cleopatra VII of Egypt and the Roman conquest in 30 BC. The Ptolemaic Kingdom was a powerful Hellenistic state, extending from southern Syria in the east, to Cyrene to the west, and south to the frontier with Nubia. Alexandria became the capital city and a center of Greek culture and trade. To gain recognition by the native Egyptian populace, they named themselves as the successors to the Pharaohs. The later Ptolemies took on Egyptian traditions, had themselves portrayed on public monuments in Egyptian style and dress, and participated in Egyptian religious life. Hellenistic culture continued to thrive in Egypt well after the Muslim conquest. The Ptolemies faced rebellions of native Egyptians often caused by an unwanted regime and were involved in foreign and civil wars that led to the decline of the kingdom and its annexation by Rome.

=== Kingdom of Iberia ===

The Kingdom of Iberia was an ancient eastern Georgian state located in the central part of transcaucasia, founded by Pharnabazus I. It would be a victim of the expansion of Armenia under Artaxias I and was later vassalized by the Roman republic under Pompey. It would experience immense growth of power and prestige in the 1st and 2nd centuries AD. At the zenith of its power under Pharasmanes I and Pharasmanes II the valiant, it exerted its influence over Armenia, North Caucasian tribes, and Albania while warring against Parthia and achieving complete independence from the Romans after penetrating as deep in Roman territory as Cappadocia (Roman province). It would become the second country to officially accept Christianity in 329 after Armenia. However, instability caused by the Roman-Persian wars would see the region divided in Roman/Byzantine and sasanid empires several times. Iberia fell under sasanid influence and even after a heroic war against zoroastrianization and Persianization, the kingdom would be annexed in 580 AD, but it left a legacy of having united most of Georgia and would be a subject of Georgian national awakening of the 20th century.

== Ancient Eurasian Steppe ==
=== Scythia ===
The Scythians (/ˈsɪθiən/ or /ˈsɪðiən/) or Scyths (/ˈsɪθ/, but note Scytho- (/ˈsaɪθoʊ/) in composition) and sometimes also referred to as the Pontic Scythians, were an ancient Eastern Iranian equestrian nomadic people who had migrated during the 9th to 8th centuries BC from Central Asia to the Pontic Steppe in modern-day Ukraine and Southern Russia, where they remained established from the 7th century BC until the 3rd century BC.

After the Scythians' disappearance, authors of the ancient, mediaeval, and early modern periods used their name to refer to various populations of the steppes unrelated to them.

=== Sarmatia ===
The Sarmatians (Latin: Sarmatæ or Sauromatæ, Greek: Σαρμάται, Σαυρομάται) were an Iranian people during classical antiquity, flourishing from about the 5th century BC to the 4th century AD. They spoke Scythian, an Indo-European language from the Eastern Iranian family.

Originating in Central Asia, the Sarmatians started their westward migration around the 6th century bc, coming to dominate the closely related Scythians by the 2nd century bc. The Sarmatians differed from the Scythians in their veneration of the god of fire rather than god of nature, and their women's prominent role in warfare, which possibly served as the inspiration for the Amazons. At their greatest reported extent, around the 1st century AD, these tribes ranged from the Vistula River to the mouth of the Danube and eastward to the Volga, bordering the shores of the Black and Caspian seas as well as the Caucasus to the south. Their territory, which was known as Sarmatia to Greco-Roman ethnographers, corresponded to the western part of greater Scythia (mostly modern Ukraine and Southern Russia, also to a smaller extent north eastern Balkans around Moldova). According to authors Arrowsmith, Fellowes and Graves Hansard in their book A Grammar of Ancient Geography published in 1832, Sarmatia had two parts, Sarmatia Europea and Sarmatia Asiatica covering a combined area of 503,000 sq mi or 1,302,764 km^{2}.

=== Xiongnu ===
Xiongnu

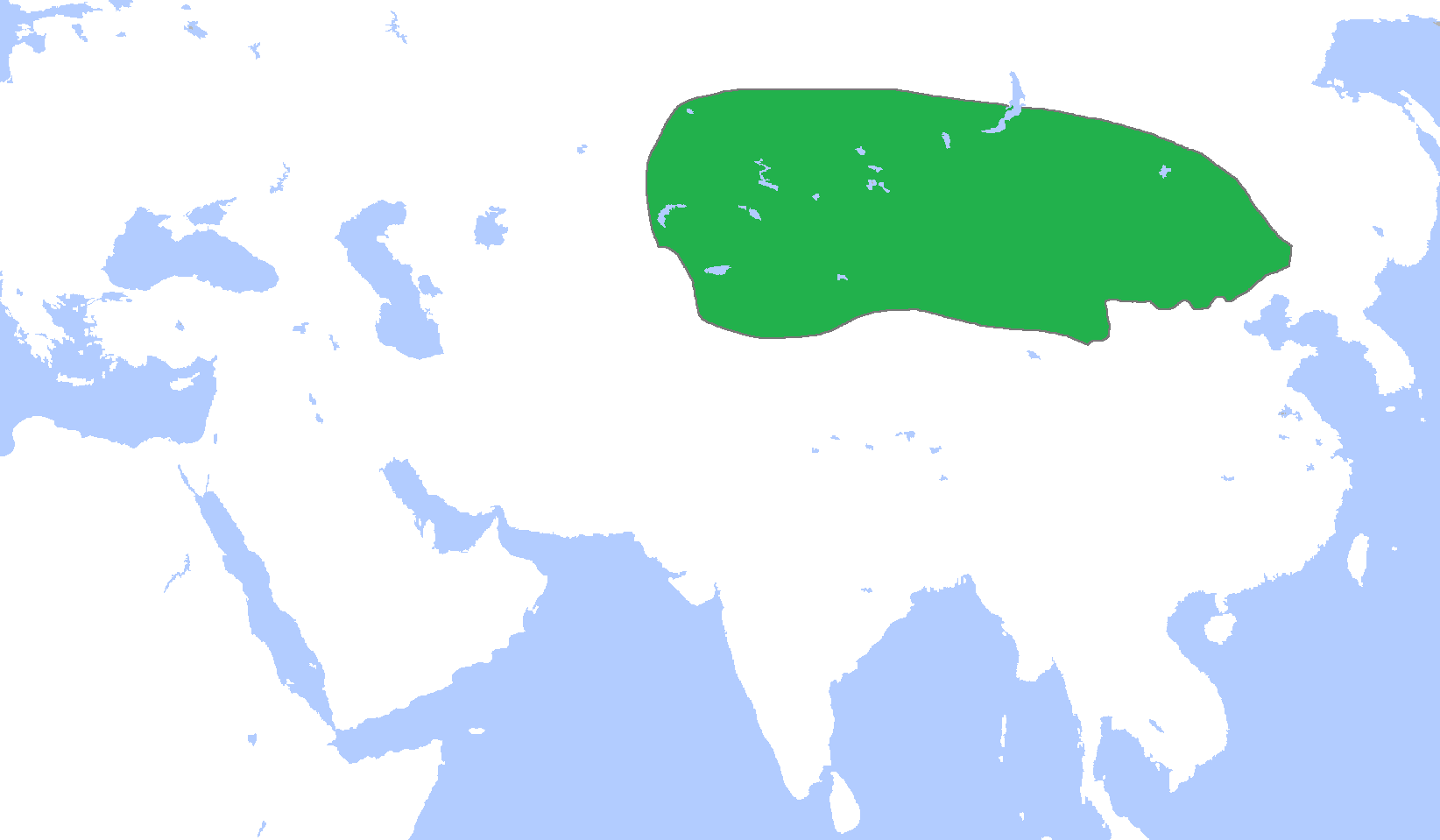
Xiongnu c. 174 Xiongnu Region Outlying regions

Xiongnu (Hsiung nu) was a nomadic empire that flourished in the central Asia. Their origin is debatable, but they probably spoke either an Iranian, Proto-Turkic, Proto-Mongolic, or Yeniseian language.They conquered most of modern Mongolia under their leader Toumen (220–209 BC) in the 3rd century BC. During Modu's reign (209–174 BC) they defeated both the Donghu in the east and Yuezhi in the west and they began threatening Han China.

The Great Wall of China had been constructed to protect Chinese towns from the Xiongnu attacks, and other nomadic empires. While the Chinese were trying to bring the Xiongnu under control, something of high significance happened: cross-cultural encounters. A large variety of people (such as traders, ambassadors, hostages, parents in cross-cultural marriages, etc.) served as helpers that passed on ideas, values, and techniques across cultural boundary lines. These encounters helped cultures learn from other cultures. The Xiongnu Empire disintegrated into two parts during the 1st century; eventually the Xiongnu fell due to their defeat in the Han–Xiongnu War.

=== Huns ===
Hunnic Empire

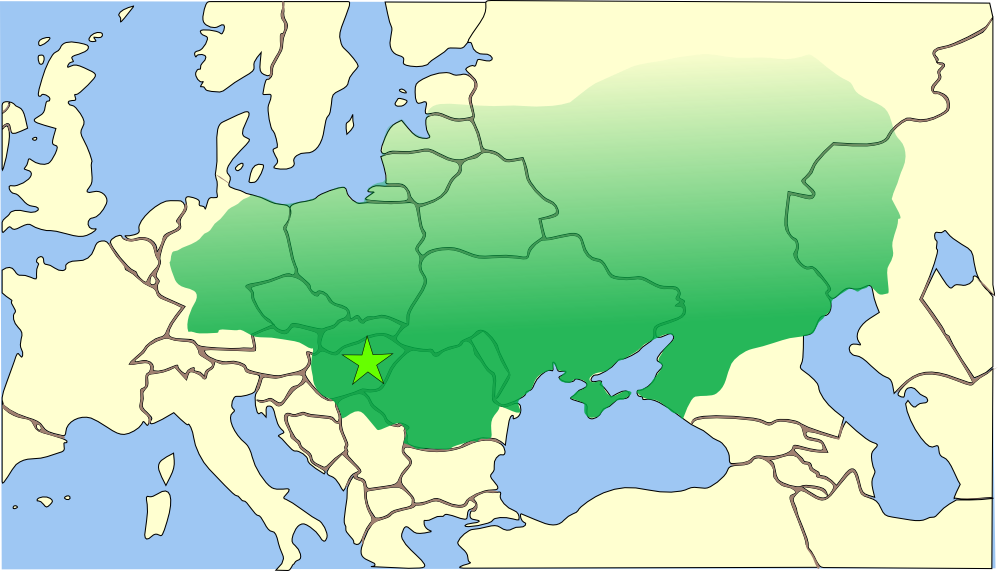
The Hunnic Empire Attila's imperial capital (approximate) Attila's empire (approximate) Non-Hunnic Regions

Huns were nomadic people who were known for their hordes of mounted archers. There is no consensus on the classification of their language, although it has been compared to Turkic, Mongolic, Tungusic, Yeniseian and Uralic families. After circa 370 CE, under an unknown Balamber, they founded an empire in Eastern Europe, defeating the Alans and the Goths. They triggered the great migration, which eventually caused the collapse of the Western Roman Empire.

The rise of the Huns around 370 overwhelmed the Gothic kingdoms. Many of the Goths were forced to migrate into Roman territory in the Balkans, while others remained north of the Danube, under Hunnic rule. The death of Rugila in 434 CE left the sons of his brother Mundzuk, Attila and Bleda, in control of the united Hun tribes. Attila the Hun ruled the Huns from 434 until his death in 453, and invaded parts of Europe. Under his rule and leadership of the Hunnic Empire, the empire stretched from modern Germany to the Ural, and from the Danube to the Baltic Sea.

During Attila the Hun's rule, he was one of the most fearsome enemies of the Western and Eastern Roman Empire. He invaded the Balkans twice and marched through Gaul (modern France) as far as Orléans before being defeated at the Battle of Châlons, though some scholars now believe this battle resulted in a stalemate or even a Hunnish victory. He appeared in North Italy in the next year. After Attila's death in 453, the Hunnic Empire collapsed in 469. The Huns seem to have been absorbed by other ethnic groups such as the Bulgars. Kim, however, argues that the Huns continued under Ernak, becoming the Kutrigur and Utigur Hunno-Bulgars. This conclusion is still subject to some controversy. Some scholars also argue that another group identified in ancient sources as Huns, the North Caucasian Huns, were genuine Huns. The rulers of various post-Hunnic steppe peoples are known to have claimed descent from Attila in order to legitimize their right to the power, and various steppe peoples were also called "Huns" by Western and Byzantine sources from the fourth century onward.

== See also ==
- Ancient Civilizations Forum
- Historic recurrence
- List of medieval great powers
- List of modern great powers
- Great power
- Middle power
- Superpower

General topics
History of warfare
Political science
Power in international relations, Expansionism
General Lists
List of largest empires, List of transcontinental countries, List of former transcontinental countries

== Bibliography ==
- Archibald, Z. H. (1998). The Odrysian Kingdom of Thrace. Orpheus Unmasked. Clarendon. ISBN 978-0-19-815047-3.
- Cooper, F. (2008). Empires and Political Imagination in World History. Princeton [u.a.]: Princeton University Press.
- Delev, Peter (2000). "Lysimachus, the Getae, and Archaeology". The Classical Quarterly. 50 (2). Cambridge University: 384–401. doi:10.1093/cq/50.2.384. ISSN 1471-6844. JSTOR 1558897.
- Delev, Peter (2015a). "Thrace from the Assassination of Kotys I to Koroupedion (360–281 BC)". In Valeva, Julia; Nankov, Emil; Graninger, Danver (eds.). A Companion to Ancient Thrace. Wiley-Blackwell. pp. 48–58. ISBN 978-1-4443-5104-0.
- Delev, Peter (2015b). "From Koroupedion to the Beginning of the Third Mithridatic War (281–73 BCE)". In Valeva, Julia; Nankov, Emil; Graninger, Danver (eds.). A Companion to Ancient Thrace. Wiley-Blackwell. pp. 59–74. ISBN 978-1-4443-5104-0.
- Delev, Peter (2018). "Did a "Late" Odrysian Kingdom ever exist?". Atephanos Archaeological ad 80 annum professoris Ludmili Getov. St. Kliment Ohridski University. pp. 191–196.
- Doyle, M. W. (1986). Empires. Ithaca, N.Y: Cornell University Press.
- Ellis, Edward Sylvester and Charles F. Horne (1906). The story of the greatest nations: from the dawn of history to the twentieth century : a comprehensive history founded upon the leading authorities, including a complete chronology of the world and a pronouncing vocabulary of each nation, Volume 1. F. R. Niglutsch.
- Farrington, K. (2003). Historical Atlas of Empires. London: Mercury.
- Harrison, T., & J. Paul Getty Museum. (2009). The Great Empires of the Ancient World. Los Angeles, Calif: J. Paul Getty Museum.
- Khan, A. (2004). A Historical Atlas of India. New York: Rosen Pub.
- Kim, Hyun Jin (2013). The Huns, Rome and the Birth of Europe. Cambridge University Press. ISBN 978-1-107-00906-6.
- Kim, Hyun Jin (2015). The Huns. Routledge. ISBN 978-1-138-84175-8.
- Labberton, R. H. (1874). An Historical Atlas Containing a Chronological Series of One Hundred Maps. Philadelphia: Claxton, Remsen & Haffelfinger.
- Labberton, R. H. (1884). An historical atlas: A chronological series of one hundred and twelve maps at successive periods. New York.
- Lund, Helene S. (1992). Lysimachus. A Study in Early Hellenistic Kingship. Taylor & Francis Ltd. ISBN 978-0-415-07061-4.
- Maenchen-Helfen, Otto J. (1973). Knight, Max (ed.). The World of the Huns: Studies in Their History and Culture. University of California Press. ISBN 978-0-520-01596-8.
- Morris, I., & Scheidel, W. (2009). The Dynamics of Ancient Empires: State power from Assyria to Byzantium. Oxford: Oxford University Press.
- Petitjean, P., Jami, C., Moulin, A. M., & Equipe REHSEIS (Centre national de la recherche scientifique (France)). (1992). Science and Empires: Historical Studies about Scientific Development and European Expansion. Dordrecht: Kluwer Academic Publishers.
- Powell, T. (1888). Illustrated Home Book of the World's Great Nations: Being a Geographical, Historical and Pictorial Encyclopedia. Chicago: People's Pub. Co.
- Ringmar, Erik. History of International Relations Open Textbook Project, Cambridge: Open Book, forthcoming.
- Róna-Tas, András (1999). Hungarians and Europe in the Early Middle Ages: An Introduction to Early Hungarian History. Budapest: Central European University Press.
- Shepherd, W. R., & C.S. Hammond & Company. (1911). Historical Atlas. New York: Henry Holt and Co.
- Sinor, Denis (2005). "Hun Religion". In Jones, Lindsay (ed.). Encyclopedia of Religion. Vol. 6 (2nd ed.). Macmillan Reference. pp. 4228–4229. ISBN 978-0-02-865733-2. OCLC 56057973.
- Sobotkova, Adela (2013). "Resisting Rule in Ancient Thrace". In Manolis Manoledakis (ed.). Exploring the Hospitable Sea Proceedings of the International Workshop on the Black Sea in Antiquity held in Thessaloniki, 21–23 September 2012. Archaeopress. pp. 133–146. ISBN 978-1-4073-1114-2.
- Stoyanov, Totko (2015a). "Un centre de pouvoir gète: Hélis-Sboryanovo". In Jean-Luc Martinez (ed.). L'épopée des rois thraces des guerres médiques aux invasions celtes 479–278 av. j. c. Découvertes archéologiques en bulgarie. pp. 254–255. ISBN 978-2-7572-0932-5.
- Stoyanov, Totko (2015b). "Warfare". In Valeva, Julia; Nankov, Emil; Graninger, Danver (eds.). A Companion to Ancient Thrace. Wiley-Blackwell. pp. 426–442. ISBN 978-1-4443-5104-0.
- Strobel, Karl (2019). "Südosteuropa in der Zeit von Republik und Principat. Vorgeschichte, Etablierung und Konsolidierung römischer Herrschaft". In Mitthof, Fritz; Schreiner, Peter; Schmitt, Oliver Jens (eds.). Handbuch zur Geschichte Südosteuropas. Vol. Band 1. Herrschaft und Politik in Südosteuropa von der römischen Antike bis 1300. De Gruyter. pp. 131–266. ISBN 978-3-11-064342-8.
- Worcester, J. E. (1834). Elements of History, Ancient & Modern: With Historical Charts. Boston: Hilliard.
- Worthington, Ian (2014). By the Spear. Philip II, Alexander the Great, and the Rise and Fall of the Macedonian Empire. Oxford University. ISBN 978-0-19-992986-3.
- Wright, Rita P. (2009), The Ancient Indus: Urbanism, Economy, and Society, Cambridge University Press, ISBN 978-0-521-57219-4
- Yonge, C. M. (1882). A Pictorial History of the World's Great Nations: From the Earliest Dates to the Present Time, Volume 3. New York: S. Hess.
