= Zenobia of Armenia =

1st century AD Iberian princess and Queen of Armenia

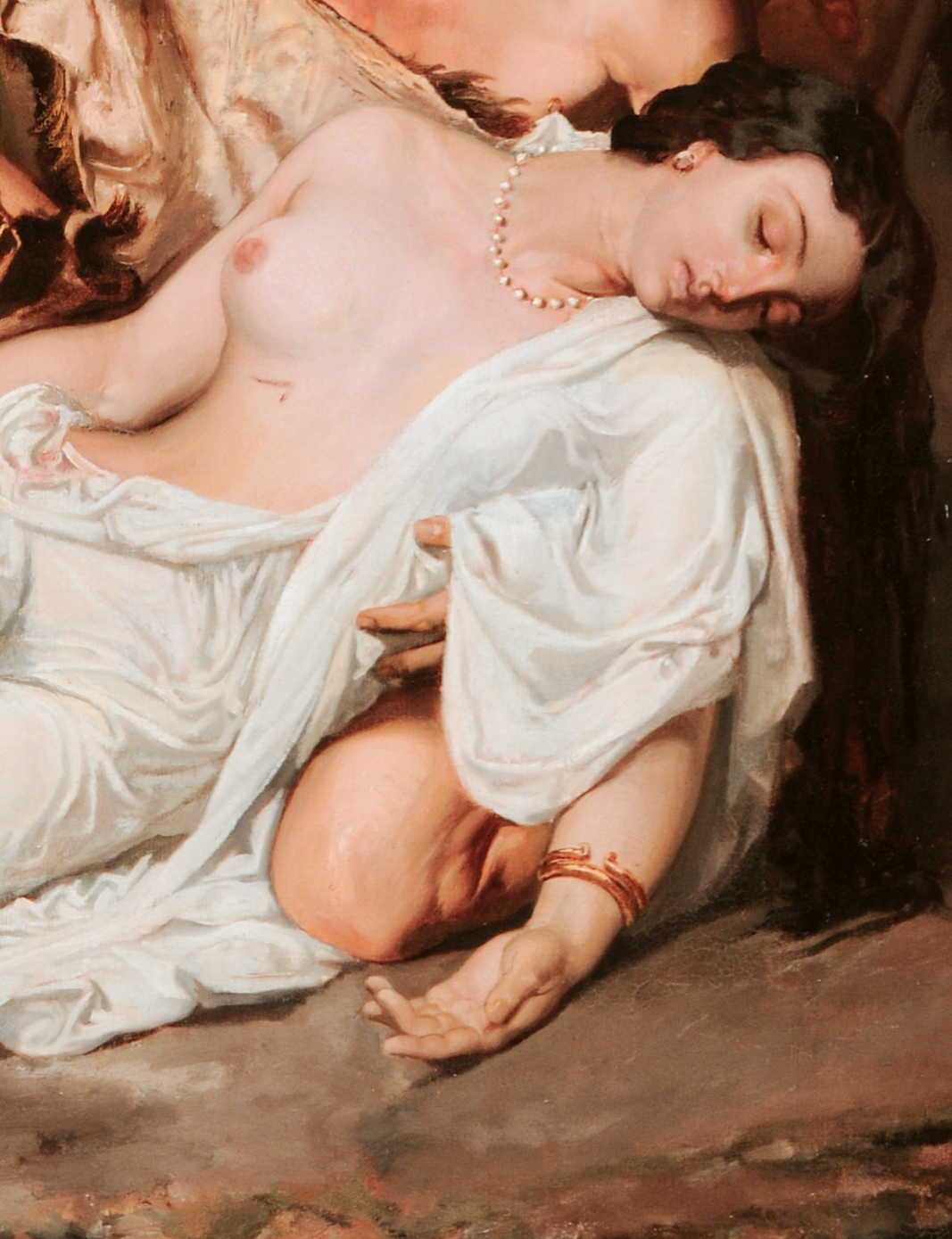
- Zenobia by Paul-Jacques-Aimé Baudry

Queen of Armenia
- Tenure: 51–53; 54–55
- Born: Kingdom of Iberia
- Died: 1st century Kingdom of Armenia
- Spouse: Rhadamistus
- Issue: unknown son
- Dynasty: Pharnavazid dynasty
- Father: Mithridates of Armenia
- Mother: daughter of Pharasmanes I sister of Rhadamistus

Zenobia of Armenia (fl. 1st century) was a royal Iberian princess of the Pharnavazid dynasty who was a Queen of Armenia from 51 to 53 and 54 to 55 during the reign of her husband, King Rhadamistus.

== Life ==
Zenobia was a daughter of King Mithridates of Armenia by his wife, a daughter of King Pharasmanes I of Iberia, who was Mithridates' own brother. At the same time, she was a wife of Rhadamistus who was Pharasmanes' son.

Zenobia's father Mithridates reigned in Armenia until her husband and Mithridates' nephew and son-in-law Rhadamistus usurped the Armenian throne by the sudden invasion. Her husband destroyed her entire family. Rhadamistus killed both of Zenobia's parents, her mother being Rhadamistus' own sister. Zenobia's brothers were also killed by Rhadamistus just because they were crying over their parents' death.

After execution of her entire family Rhadamistus became king in 51 and she became his queen. Armenians revolted soon after and, with the Parthian support of prince Tiridates I, forced both to flee back to Iberia.

According to Tacitus:

Rhadamistus had no means of escape but for the swiftness of the horses which bore him and his wife away. Pregnant as she was, she endured, somehow or other, likely out of fear of the enemy and love of her husband, the first part of the flight, but after a while, when she felt herself shaken by its continuous speed, she implored to be rescued by an honourable death from the shame of captivity. He at first embraced, cheered, and encouraged her, now admiring her heroism, now filled with a sickening apprehension at the idea of her being left to any man's mercy. Finally, urged by the intensity of his love and familiarity with dreadful deeds, he unsheathed his scymitar, and having stabbed her, dragged her to the bank of the Araxes and committed her to the stream, so that her very body might be swept away. Then in headlong flight he hurried to Iberia, his ancestral kingdom. Zenobia meanwhile (this was her name), as she yet breathed and showed signs of life on the calm water at the river's edge, was perceived by some shepherds, who inferring from her noble appearance that she was no base-born woman, bound up her wound and applied to it their rustic remedies. As soon as they knew her name and her adventure, they conveyed her to the city of Artaxata, whence she was conducted at the public charge to Tiridates, who received her kindly and treated her as a royal person.

Zenobia is said to have given birth to an unknown son from Rhadamistus in Armenia. Her and her child's later life is unknown. Her husband returning home to Iberia was soon, in 58, put to death as traitor by his own father Pharasmanes. According to the historian Leo, Zenobia lived in Tiridates’ court until her death.

== In art ==
=== Paintings ===
- "Zenobia accudita dai pastori sulle rive dell'Aras" by Bartolomeo Cittadella.
- "Rhadamistus killing Zenobia" by Luigi Sabatelli (1803).
- Zenobia Found by the Shepherds by Paul-Jacques-Aimé Baudry. (won Prix de Rome in 1850).
- Shepherds Find Zenobia on the Banks of the Araxes by William-Adolphe Bouguereau. (won Prix de Rome in 1850).
- "Queen Zenobia found on the Banks of the Arax" by Nicolas Poussin.
- "Rhadamistes and Zenobia" by Jean-Joseph Taillasson.
- "Queen Zenobia taken from river Araxes by shepherds" by Francesco Nenci.
- "Radamisto in atto di spingere Zenobia ferita nel fiume Arasse" by Francesco Alberi.
- "Zénobie trouvée mourante sur les bords de l’Araxe" by Merry-Joseph Blondel.
- "Zénobie découverte par les bergers sur les bords de l'Araxe" by Charles Camille Chazal.
- "Zénobie trouvée mourante par les bergers sur les bords de l'Araxe" by Pierre Dupuis.
- "Zenobia" by Émile Lévy.
- "Zenobia Discovered by Shepherds on the Banks of the Araxes" by Félix-Henri Giacomotti.
- "Queen Zenobia Thrown Into the Araxes River" by François Chifflart.
- "Rhadamiste poignarde sa femme Zénobie" by Etienne Meslier.
- "The finding of Zenobia by the shepherds" by Jean-Auguste-Dominique Ingres.

=== Statues ===
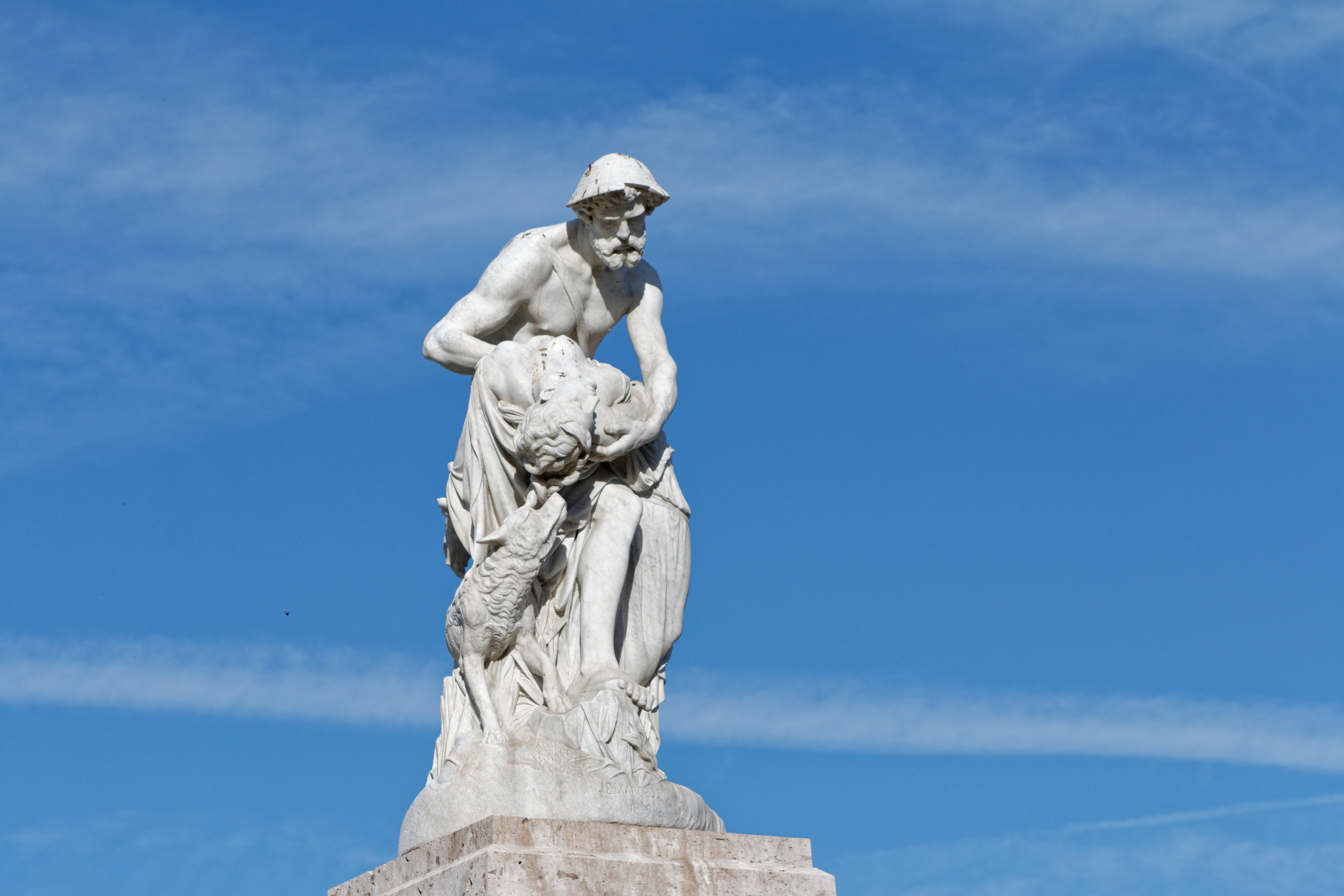
Zenobia's body fished out the Aras, by Jean Marcellin, 1859.

- "Le corps de Zénobie, reine d'Arménie retiré de l'Araxe" by Jean Esprit Marcellin at Palace of Fontainebleau.

=== Operas ===
- "L’Amour tyrannique" by Georges de Scudéry
- "Zenobia e Radamisto" by Giovanni Legrenzi
- "Rhadamiste et Zénobie" by Prosper Jolyot de Crébillon
- "La Zenobia" by Matteo Noris
- "Zenobia" by Pietro Metastasio
- "L'amor tirannico, o Zenobia" by Domenico Lalli
- "Zenobia" by Giovanni Bononcini
- "Zenobia" by Johann Adolph Hasse
- "Zenobia" by Gaetano Latilla
- "La Zenobia" by Davide Perez
- "Zenobia" by Niccolò Piccinni
- "Zenobia" by Gioacchino Cocchi
- "Zenobia" by Giovanni Battista Pescetti
- "Zenobia" by Tommaso Traetta
- "La Zenobia" by Nicola Sala
- "Zenobia" by Luca Antonio Predieri
- "Zenobia" by Francesco Uttini
- "Zenobia" by Antonio Tozzi
- "Zenobia" by Francesco Bianchi
- "Zenobia" by Louis Coerne
- "La Zenobia" by Joseph Friebert
- "L'amor tirannico, ossia Zenobia" by Francesco Feo
- "Zenobia" by Ambrogio Minoja
- "Zenobia" by Giovanni Buonaventura Viviani
- Zenobia was played by Adrienne Lecouvreur, Caterina Gabrielli and Anastasia Robinson

=== Plays ===
- Unfinished play "Rodamist i Zenobiya" by Alexander Griboyedov

== Gallery ==
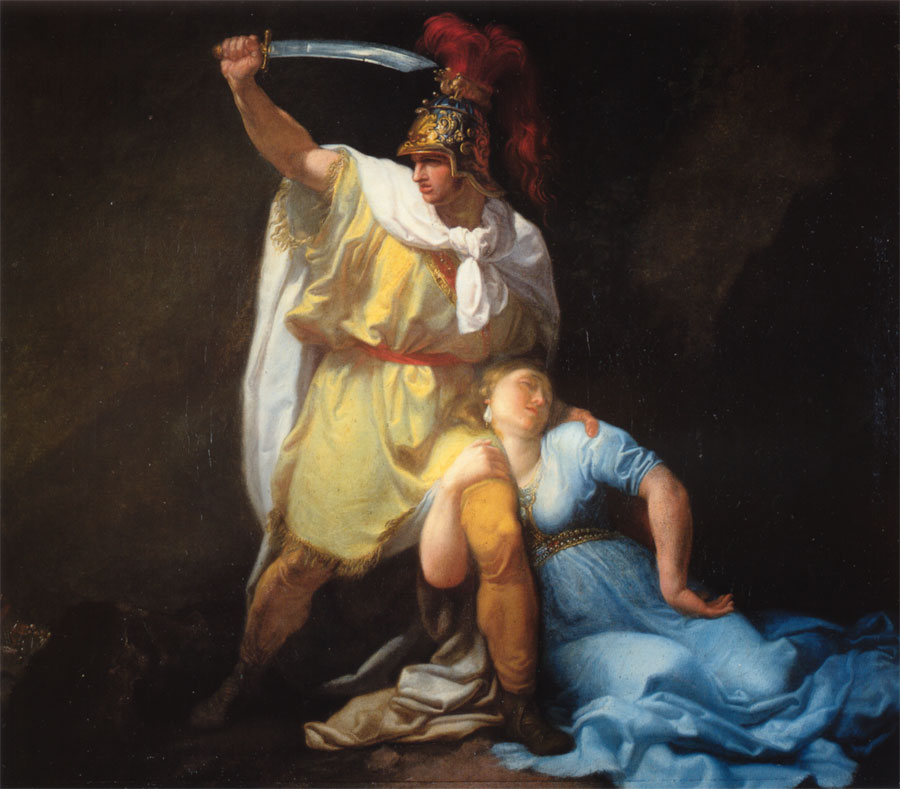
Rhadamistus killing Zenobia, by Luigi Sabatelli

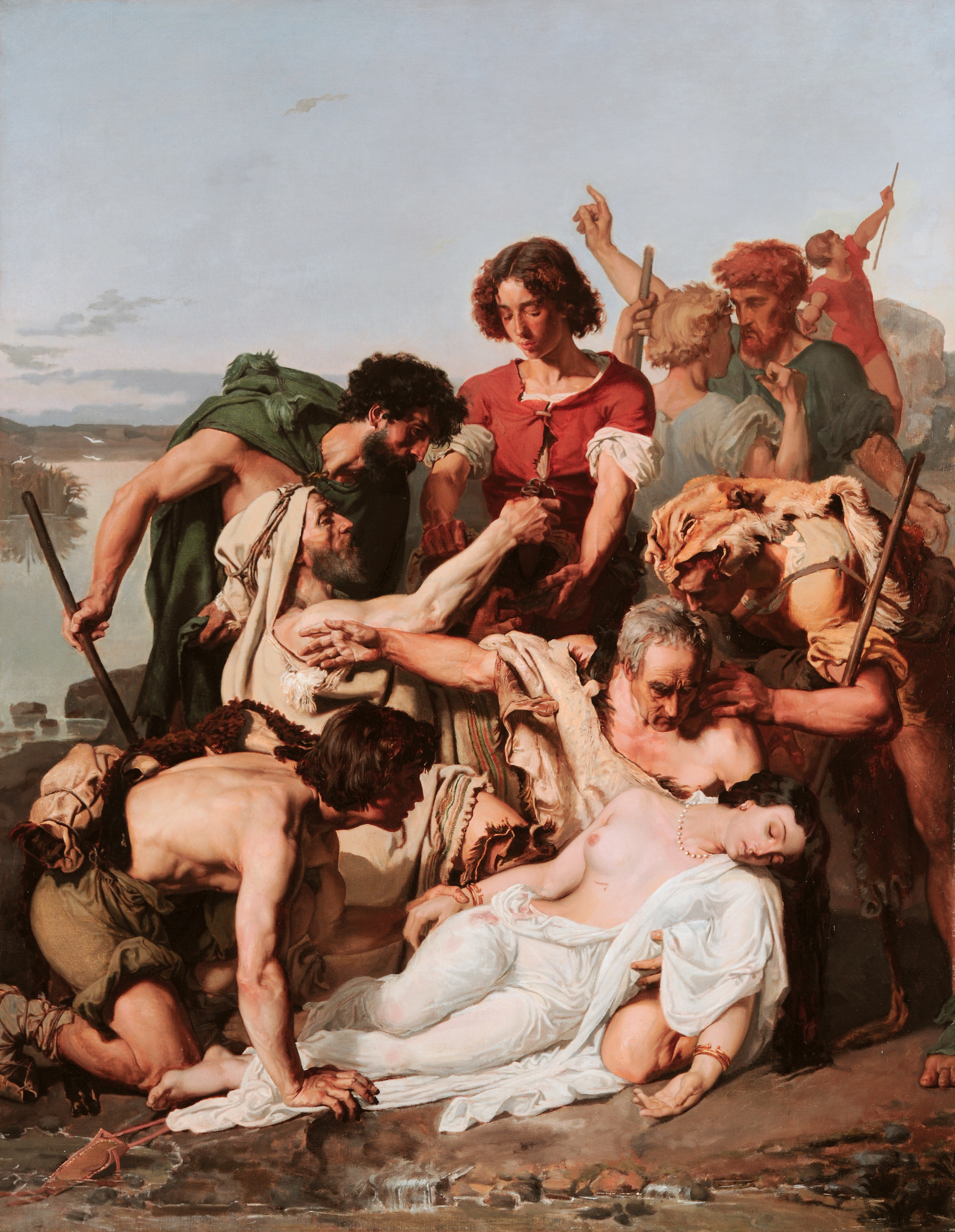
Zenobia Found by the Shepherds, by Paul-Jacques-Aimé Baudry

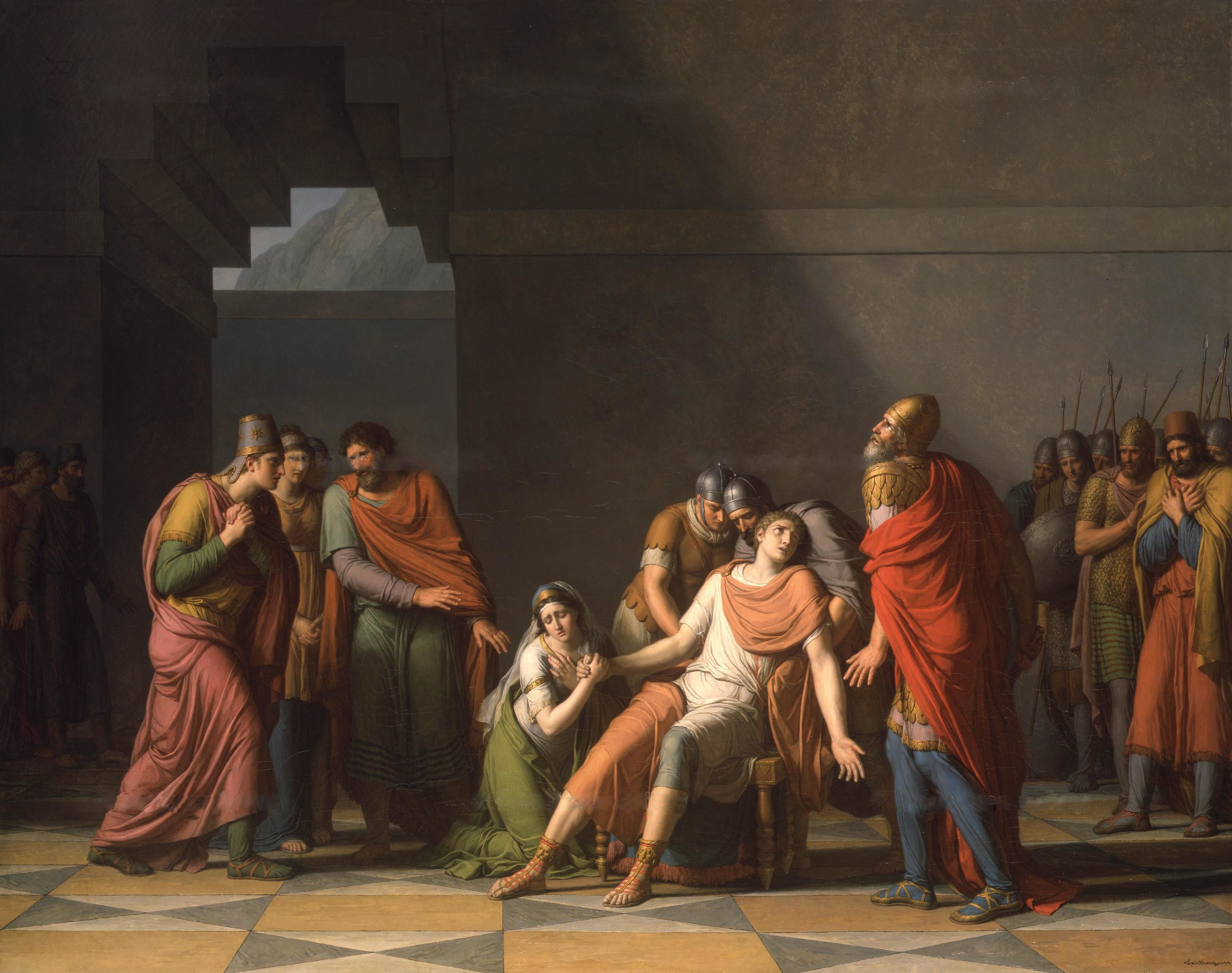
Rhadamistes and Zenobia by Jean-Joseph Taillasson.

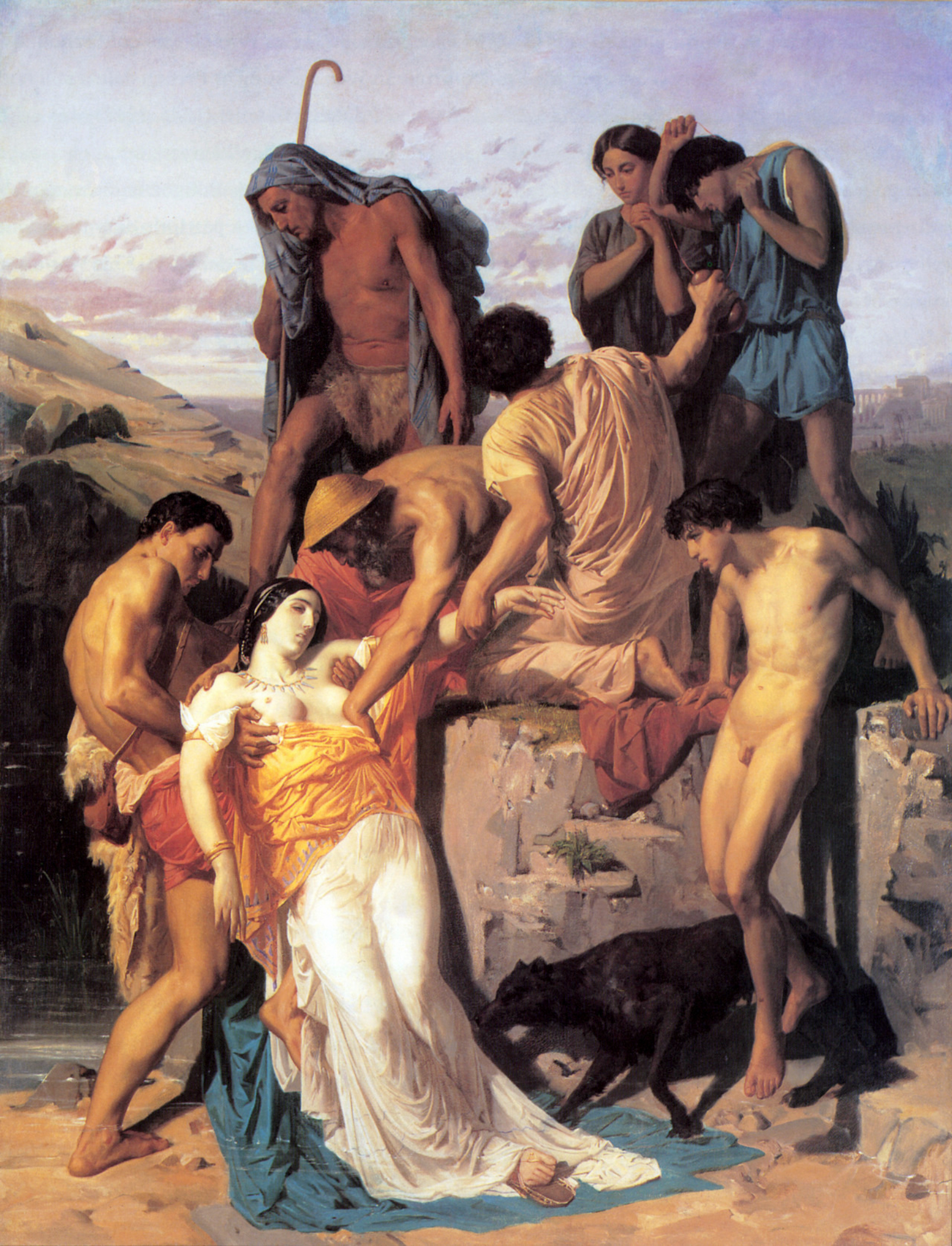
Zenobia found by Sheperds on the banks of the Araxes, by William-Adolphe Bouguereau

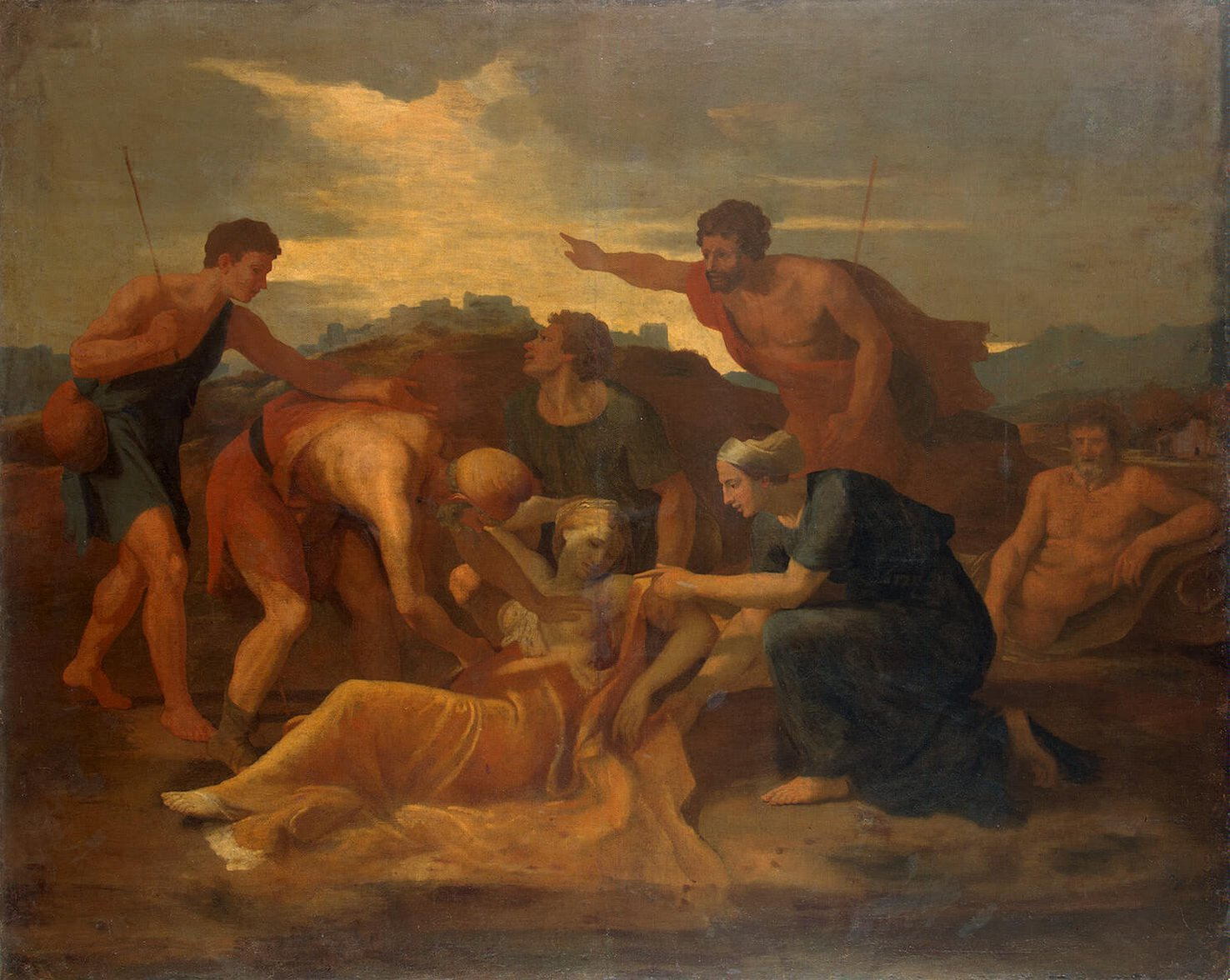
Queen Zenobia found on the Banks of the Arax, by Nicolas Poussin

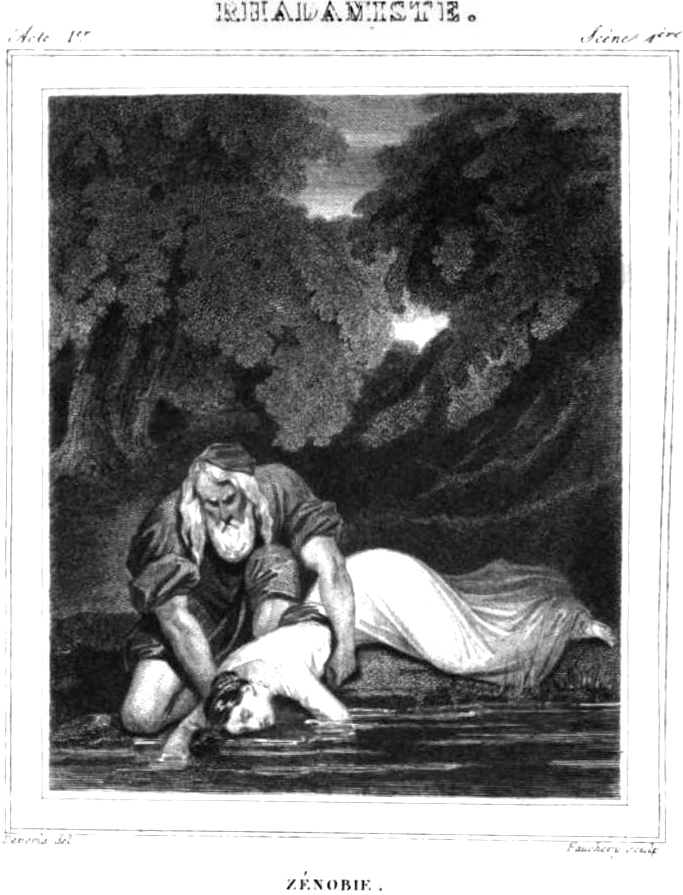
Zenobia from the opera of Prosper Jolyot de Crébillon

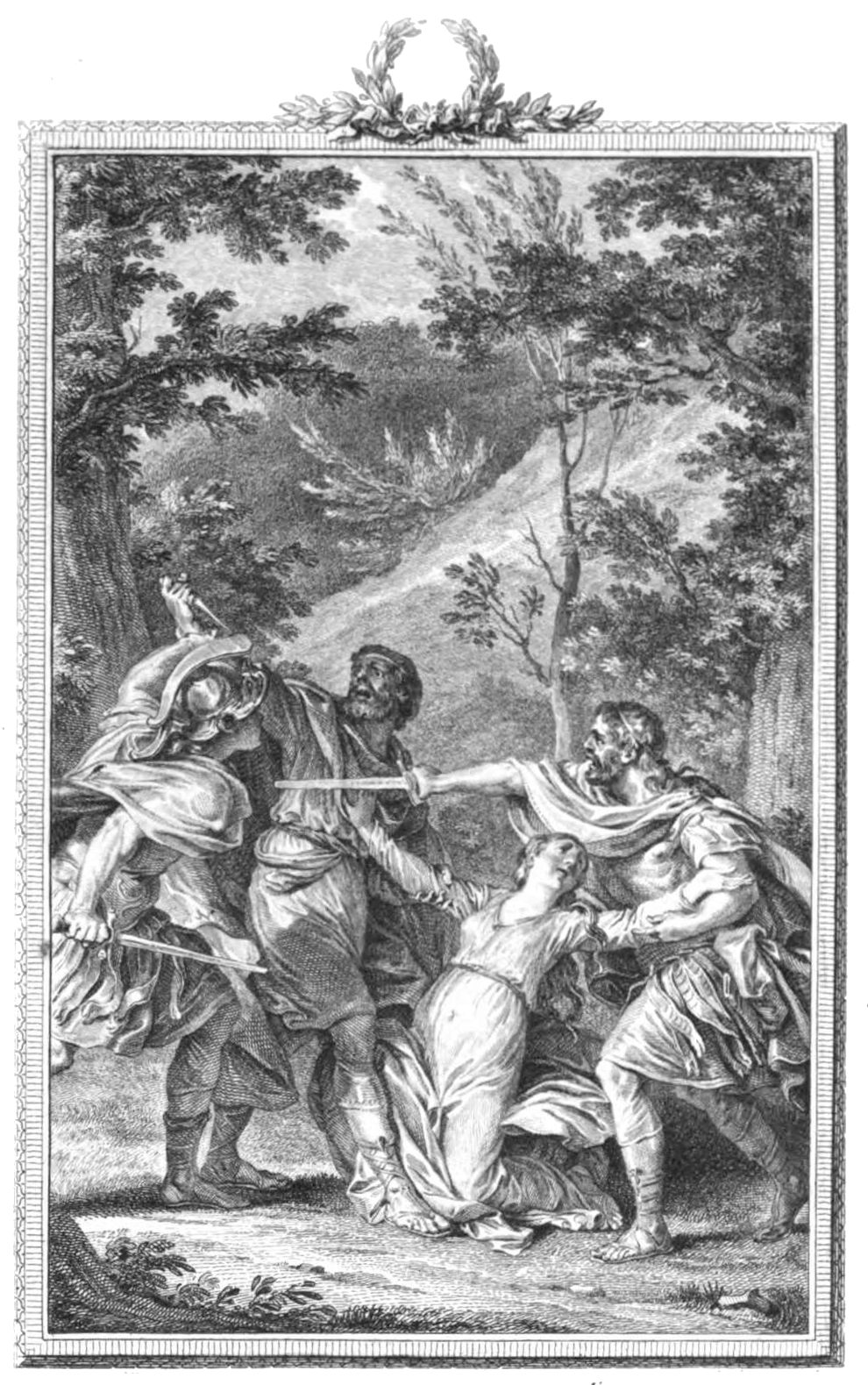
Zenobia from the opera of Metastasio

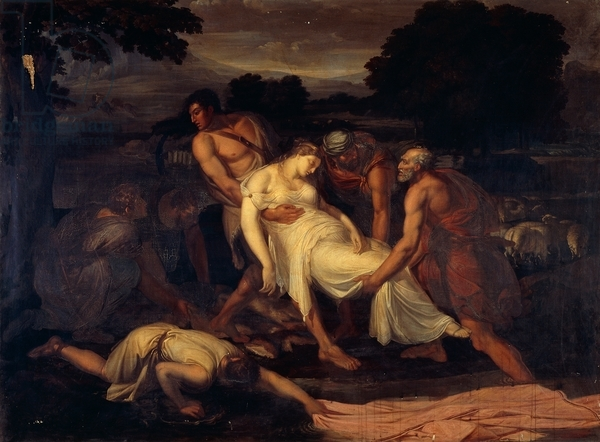
Queen Zenobia taken from river Araxes by shepherds, by Francesco Nenci.

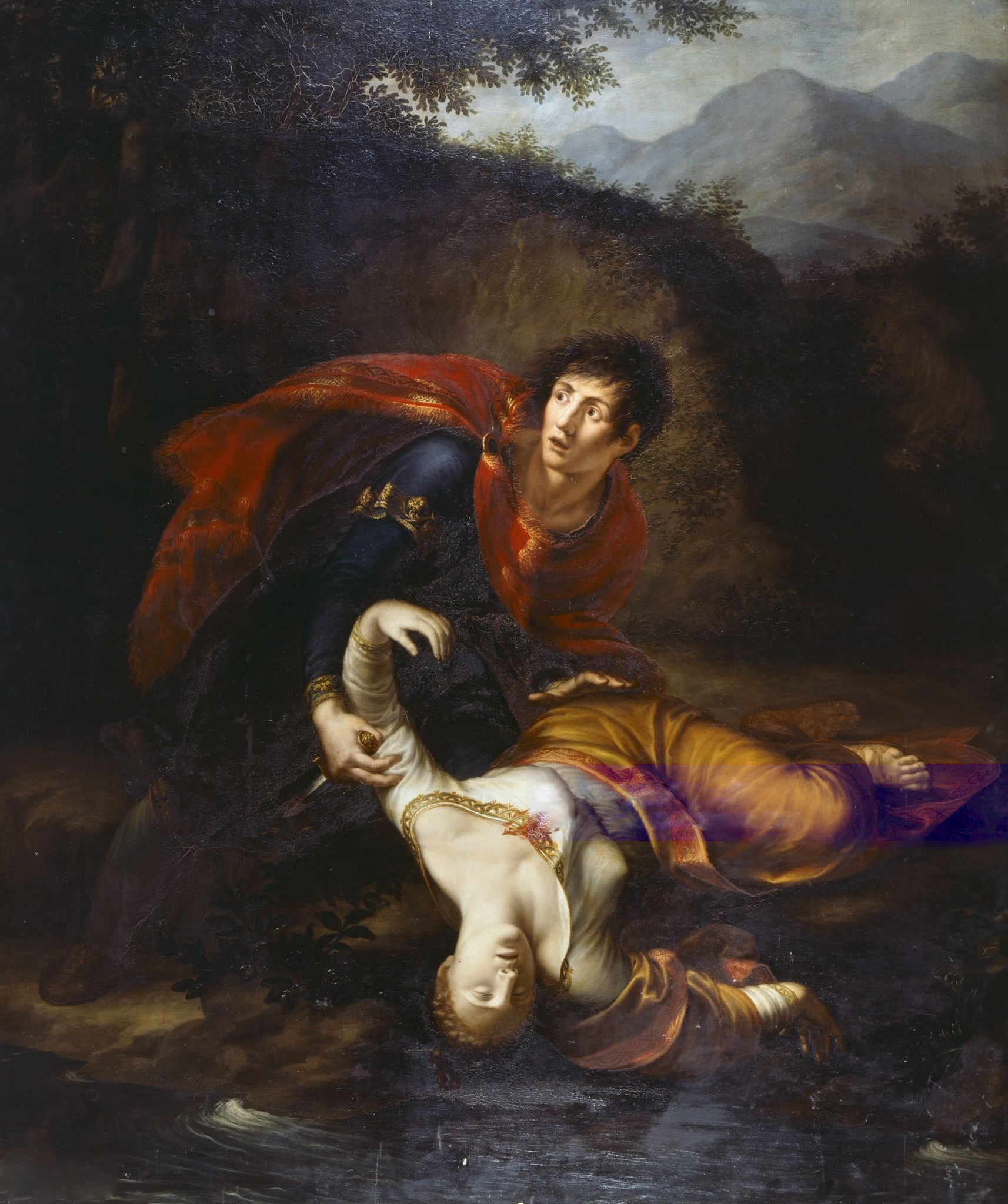
Radamisto in atto di spingere Zenobia ferita nel fiume Arasse, by Francesco Alberi.

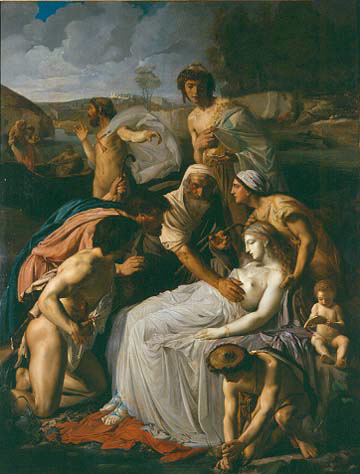
Zenobia by Émile Lévy.

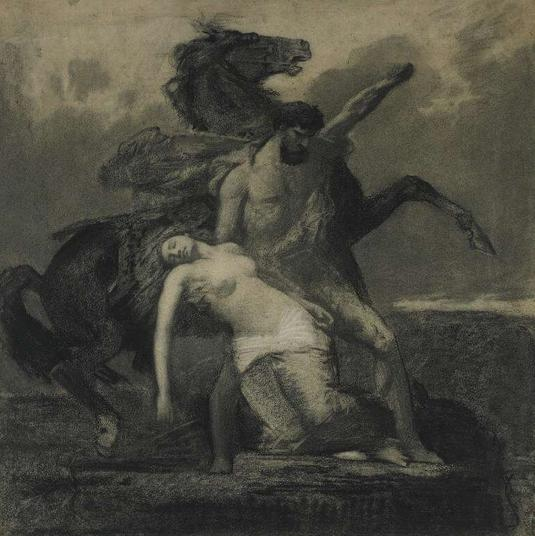
Queen Zenobia Thrown Into the Araxes River by François Chifflart.

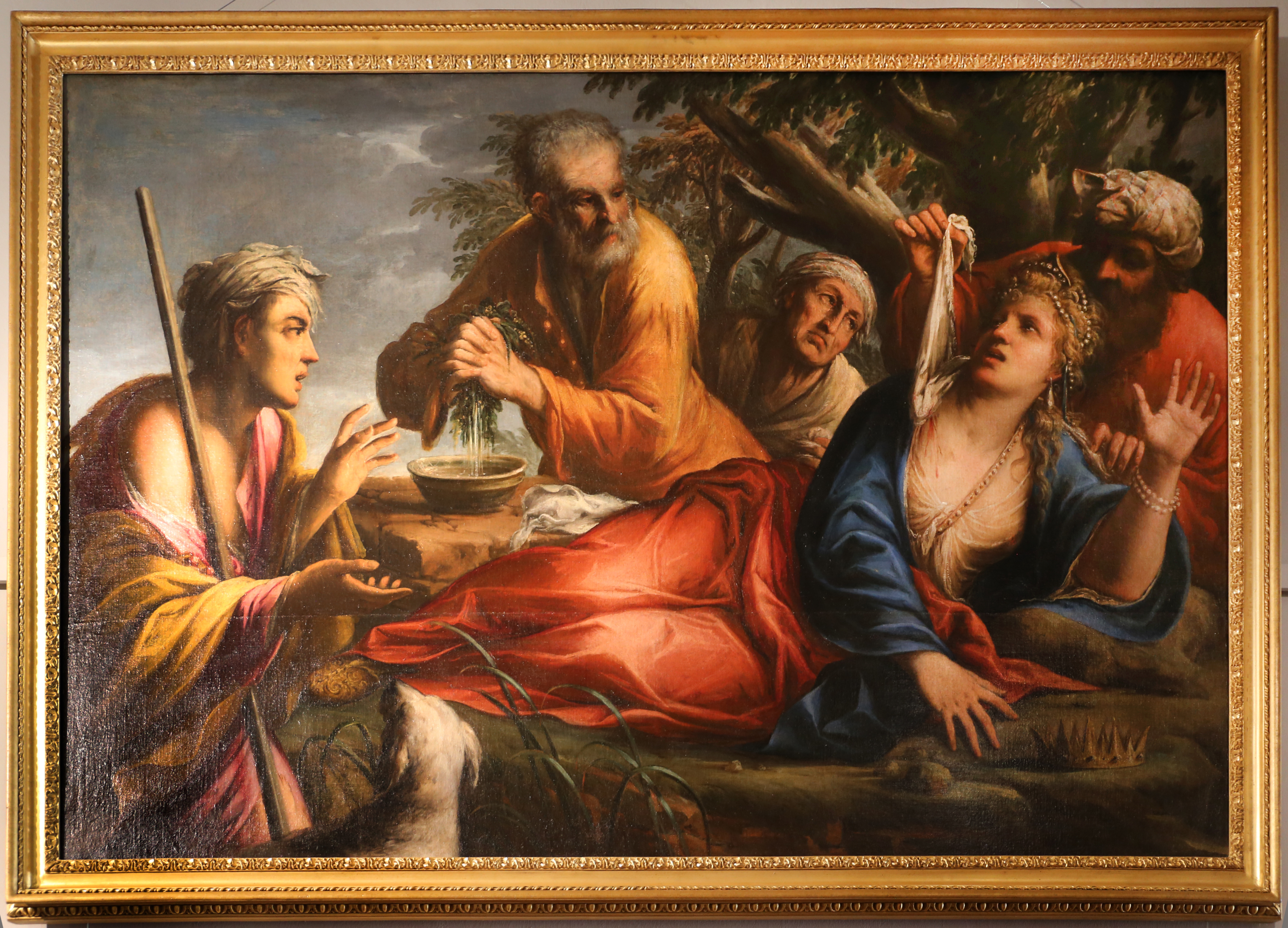
"Zenobia and the shepherds", by Bartolomeo Cittadella

== Sources ==
- Tacitus, Annals, Book XII-XIII
- Khachatrian, Hayk (2001). Queens of the Armenians: 150 Biographies Based on History and Legend. Yerevan: Amaras. ISBN 0-9648787-2-0.
- Toumanoff, Cyril (1969), Chronology of the early Kings of Iberia, Vol. 25
- Javakhishvili, Ivane (2012), History of the Georgian Nation, Vol. 1
