= Siege of Garni =

Siege between the Kingdom of Iberia and the Kingdom of Armenia

- Part of the Iberian–Armenian War
Date	51 AD
Location	Garni
Result	Iberian victory

Belligerents
Kingdom of Iberia	Kingdom of Armenia; Roman Empire

Commanders and leaders
Rhadamistus	Mithridates †; Caelius Pollio

The siege of Garni was a siege in 51 AD led by Rhadamistus, the son of the Iberian King Pharasmanes I against his uncle Mithridates, the king of Armenia in the Iberian–Armenian War.

== Background ==
Mithridates, the younger brother of Pharasmanes I ascended to the Armenian throne with the help of Sarmatians and Alanian mercenaries. A Roman garrison installed in Garni near Artaxata secured Mithridates' rule over Armenia, Although Emperor Caligula had held Mithridates of Armenia captive for some years in Rome, after which Claudius sent him back to Artaxata, Armenia was now a Roman vassal state under Iberian control.

But when Mithridates refused to support his brother Pharasmanes in a victorious attack on Caucasian Albania, Pharasmanes provided troops for his son Rhadamistus to capture Armenia and overthrow his uncle.

== Siege ==
King Pharasmanes I of Iberia gave Rhadamistus a large Iberian army, who by a sudden invasion forced King Mithridates of Armenia to take shelter in the fortress of Garni, which was strongly garrisoned by the Romans under the command of Caelius Pollio, a camp-prefect, Casperius and a centurion. Rhadamistus told to Mithridates that the Iberians were not against peace and urged his uncle to conclude a treaty. Pharasmanes by secret messages had recommended Rhadamistus to hurry on the siege by all possible means.

Later, Pollio, swayed by Rhadamistus' bribery, induced the Roman soldiers to threaten capitulation of the garrison. Under this compulsion, Mithridates agreed to surrender to his nephew and quit the fortress. Rhadamistus seeing his uncle threw himself into his embraces, feigning respect and calling him father-in-law and his parent. He promised that he would do him no harm or violence either by the sword or by poison. He drew him into a neighboring woods, where he assured him that the appointed sacrifice was prepared for their confirmation of peace in the presence of the Iberian gods, as it was their custom, whenever they joined alliance, to unite their right hands and bind together the thumbs in a tight knot and then, when the blood would flow into the extremities, they would let it escape by a slight puncture and then suck it in turn.

But on this occasion the one who was applying the knot pretended that it had fallen off, and suddenly seized the knees of Mithridates flinging him to the ground. At the same moment a rush was made by others, and chains were thrown around him. Rhadamistus was mindful of his promise so he neither unsheathed the sword nor used any poison against his uncle to kill him, but instead had him thrown on the ground and then smothered his uncle under a mass of heavy clothes and featherbeds. Later the sons of Mithridates were also butchered by Rhadamistus for having shed tears over their parent's death. Rhadamistus also killed Mithridates' wife, who was his own sister.

== Sources ==
- Cantù, Cesare (1847) Historia universal
- Tomlins, Frederick (1844) A Universal History of the Nations of Antiquity
- Javakhishvili, Ivane (2012), History of the Georgian Nation, Vol. 1
- Rawlinson, George (2012) The Seven Great Monarchies Of The Ancient Eastern World
- Crévier, Jean-Baptiste Louis (1814) L'Histoire des empereurs des Romains
- Tacitus, Annals, Book XII-XIII
- Baumer, Christoph (2023). History of the Caucasus. Bloomsbury Publishing. ISBN 9780755636303.
- Rayfield, Donald (2012). Edge of Empires, a History of Georgia. London: Reaktion Books. ISBN 978-1-78023-070-2.
- Tacitus. Annals. Book XII, Chapters 44-51.
