= Zenobia e Radamisto =

Opera by composer Giovanni Legrenzi

- Opera by Giovanni Legrenzi
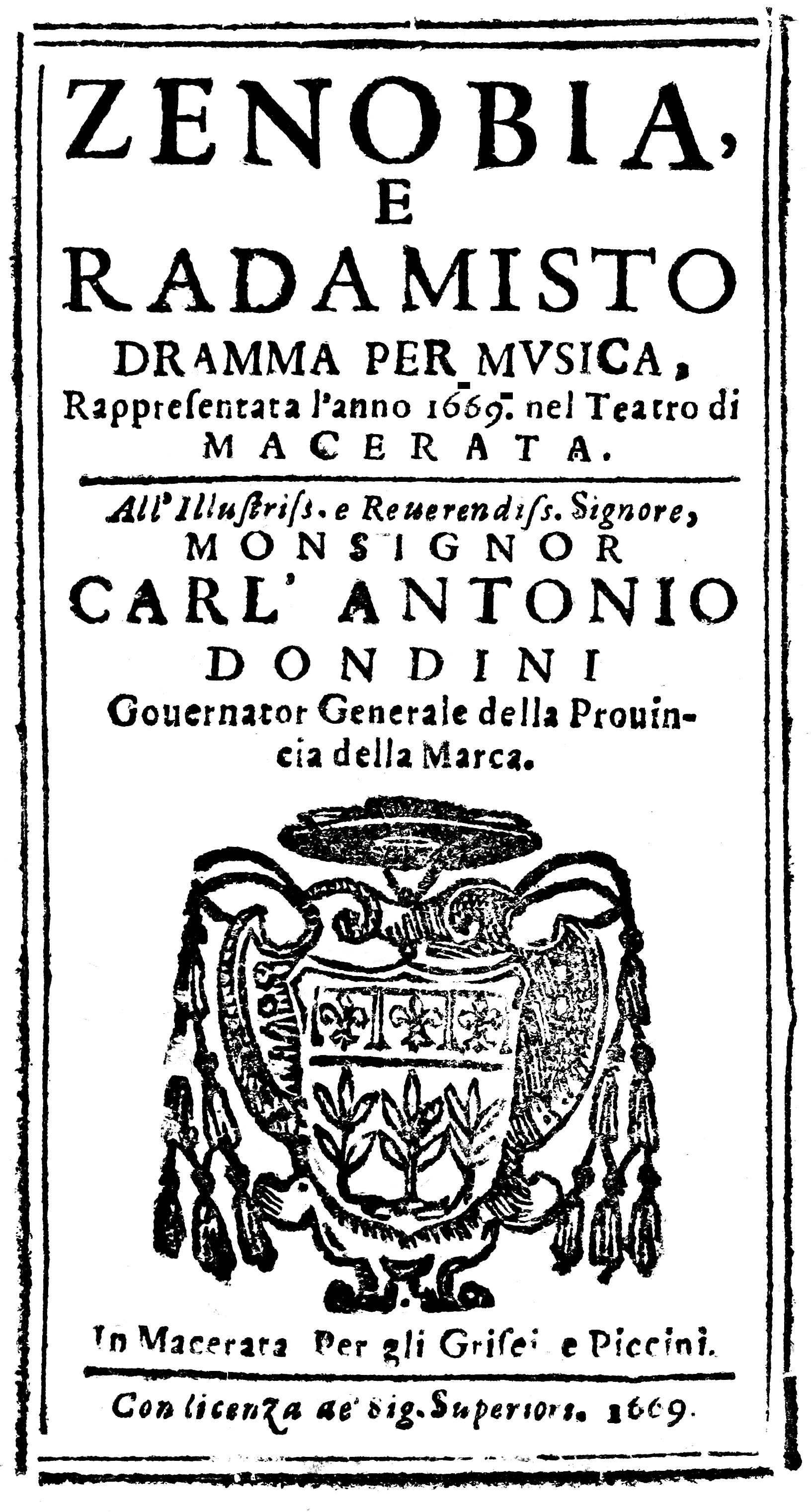
- Front page of the libretto printed for the 1669 performance in Macerata
- Librettist: Ippolito Bentivoglio
- Premiere: 1 June 1665; Teatro Bonacossi, Ferrara

Zenobia e Radamisto is an opera in 3 acts and nine scenes by composer Giovanni Legrenzi. The opera uses an Italian language libretto by Ippolito Bentivoglio (1611–1685). The third opera written by Legrenzi, the work premiered on 1 June 1665 at the Teatro Bonacossi in Ferrara in celebration of the marriage of Nicolò Santini and Maria Luisa Bonvisi. The opera was subsequently mounted in Brescia (1666), Verona (1667), and Macerata (1669).

Legrenzi revised the work for the Venice premiere of the opera at the Teatro San Salvatore on 26 December 1667. The revised opera also utilized an altered version of Bentivoglio's libretto by Nicolò Minato. In 2013 the Italian Academy of Musical Research published the original 1665 version of the libretto and the first critical edition of the score.

== Roles ==
- Tiridate, King of Assyria
- Radamisto, disguised under the name of Creonte, King of Iberia and defeated King of Armenia
- Zenobia, queen, wife of Radamisto
- Doriclea, also under the name Ismene, Princess of the Parthian Empire
- Casperio, Tiridate's general
- Egisto, Doriclea's squire
- Oreste, Tiridate's captain of the guard
- Fidalba, Zenobia's handmaiden
- Alceste, an Armenian sheppard
- Ombra d'Armeno, Armenian wizard
- Lico, court jester
- Turpino, eunuch
- Fama
- Desiderio
- Genio
- Captain
- Chorus of soldiers and victims of the mina volante
