= Iberian–Armenian War =

War between the kingdoms of Iberia and Armenia (AD 50-53)

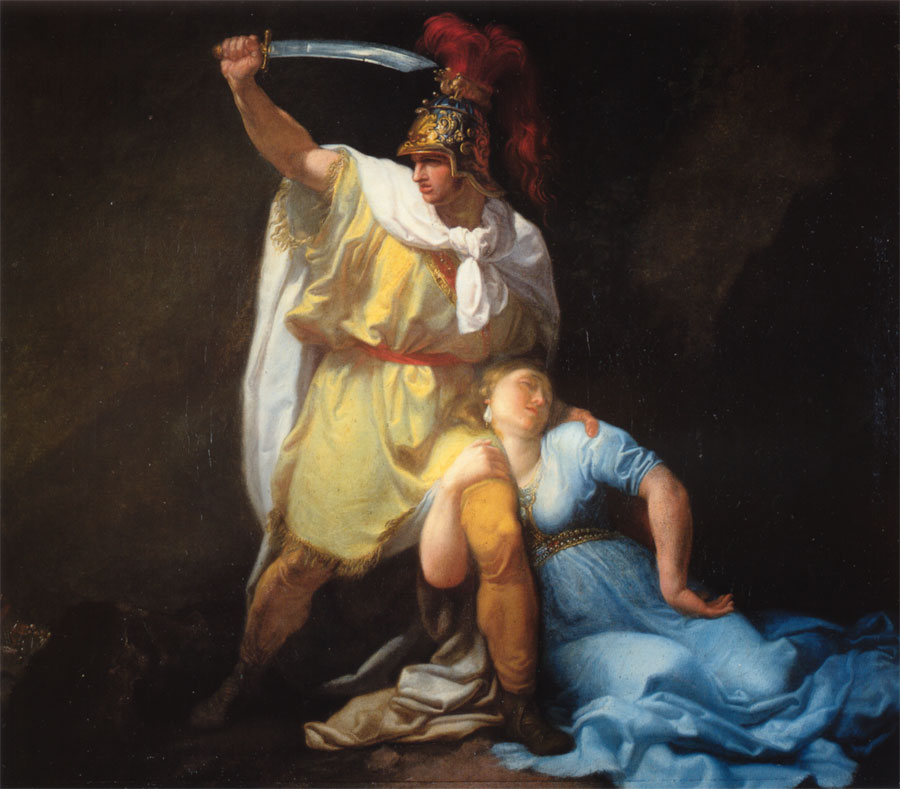
- Rhadamistus killing Zenobia
Date	50–51 AD; 52–53AD; 54AD; 55AD
Location	Armenia
Result	Iberian victory (50-51 AD); Armeno–Parthian victory (52–53 AD); Iberian victory (54 AD); Armeno-Parthian victory (55 AD); Beginning of the Armenian War between Rome and Parthia

Belligerents
Kingdom of Armenia; Parthian Empire	Kingdom of Iberia; Roman Empire

Commanders and leaders
Mithridates †; Zenobia; Tiridates I	Rhadamistus; Claudius

The war between the kingdoms of Iberia and Armenia (AD 50-55) is known chiefly through its description in Tacitus 'Annals.

The war took place as a delicate balance of power between the Roman and Parthian empires in the Caucasus. Rome was then ruled by Claudius, Parthia by Vologases I. Two Iberian brothers then ruled the Caucasian kingdoms, Pharasmanes I in Iberia, Mithridates in Armenia. They were both dependent on Roman support, which had installed Mithridates on the Armenian throne in 35 AD. However, 15 years later, trust between the brothers had deteriorated, which Tacitus blames on the intrigues of Pharasmanes' son Rhadamistus.

Fearing usurpation by Rhadamistus, his father convinced him to make war upon his uncle and claim the Armenian throne for himself. The Iberians invaded with a large army, with him surrounding and starting a siege against Mithridates at the fortress of Gorneas (Garni), which was garrisoned by the Romans under the command of Caelius Pollio, a prefect, and Casperius, a centurion. Rhadamistus took the fortress by assault. Mithridates left the fortress in order to make peace with Rhadamistus. Rhadamistus then executed Mithridates and his sons, despite a promise of non-violence, and became King of Armenia. Of this usurpation, Tacitus wrote "Rhadamistus might retain his ill-gotten gains, as long as he was hated and infamous; for this was more to Rome's interest than for him to have succeeded with glory".

Faced with this upset of the regional balance and regarding the event as unrightful appropriation, Vologases I of Parthia invaded in 52 AD to proclaim his brother Tiridates king of Armenia. The Iberians did not offer battle and withdrew from some Armenian cities including Artaxata, for the Parthians to capture them without resistance. The conflict lasted for two years, until winter, plague and shortage of supplies forced Tiridates to retire from Armenia, which allowed Rhadamistus to return with his army strengthened and reassert rule. However, he would eventually be deposed due to being oppressive and punishing the populace for what he perceived was treason, when they allowed the Parthians to enter their towns unopposed. The Armenian nobility finally revolted in 55 AD and attempted to apprehend Rhadamistus in his palace, but he managed to escape together with his spouse Zenobia. When Tiridates returned the same year, he was declared king of Armenia instead. However Parthian control over Armenia was unacceptable to Rome and soon after, the dispute escalated into the Roman–Parthian War of 58–63.

== See also ==
- Iberian invasion of Armenia

== Sources ==
Tacitus. Annals. Book XII, Chapters 44-51.
Toumanoff, Cyril (1969), Chronology of the early Kings of Iberia, Vol. 25
Grousset, R. (1947). Histoire de l'Arménie des Origines à 1071 [History of Armenia from its origins to 1071] (in French). Paris: Payot.

== Bibliography ==
- Baumer, Christoph (2023). History of the Caucasus. Bloomsbury Publishing. ISBN 9780755636303.
- Rayfield, Donald (2012). Edge of Empires, a History of Georgia. London: Reaktion Books. ISBN 978-1-78023-070-2.
