= Zenobia Found by the Shepherds =

Painting by Paul Baudry

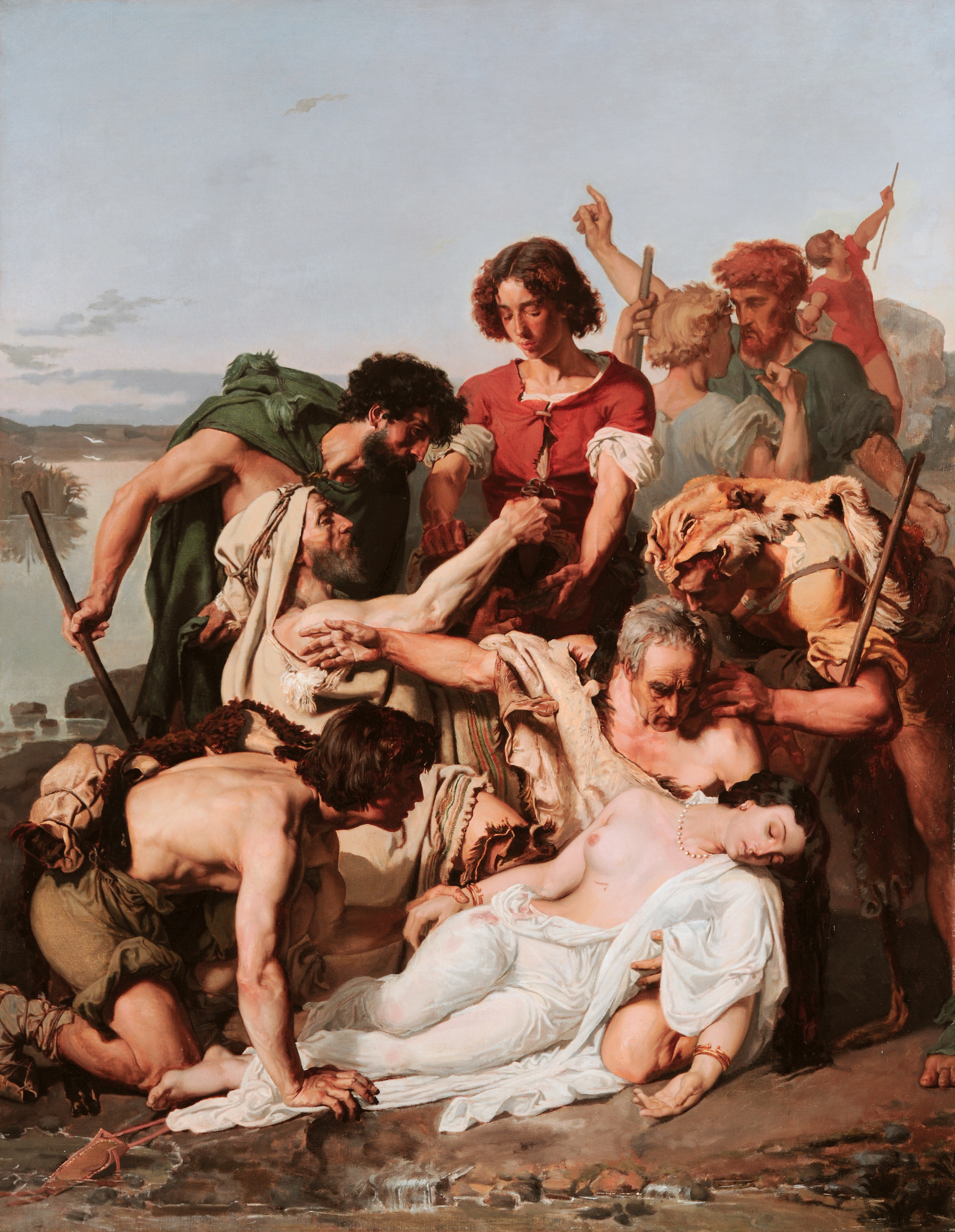
- Artist: Paul Baudry
- Year: 1850
- Medium: Oil on canvas, history painting
- Dimensions: 146 cm × 115 cm (57 in × 45 in)
- Location: École des Beaux-Arts; Paris

Zenobia Found by the Shepherds (French: Zénobie trouvée par des bergers sur les bords de l’Arax) is an 1850 history painting by the French artist Paul Baudry. It depicts a legendary scene from the life of Zenobia of Armenia inspired by the Histories of Tacitus. After her husband Rhadamistus has her thrown into the Aras to die, she is rescued by some shepherds who treat her wounds and nurse her back to health.

Baudry was awarded the Prix de Rome for the painting. William-Adolphe Bouguereau submitted his own version of the story Shepherds Find Zenobia on the Banks of the Araxes for the competition, winning second prize. Today Baudry's work is in the École des Beaux-Arts in Paris.

== Bibliography ==
- Bonfait, Olivier. D'Ingres à Degas: les artistes français à Rome. Electa, 2003.
- Denis, Rafael Cardoso & Trodd, Colin (ed.) Art and the Academy in the Nineteenth Century. Manchester University Press, 2000.
