= Clemente Alberi =

Italian painter

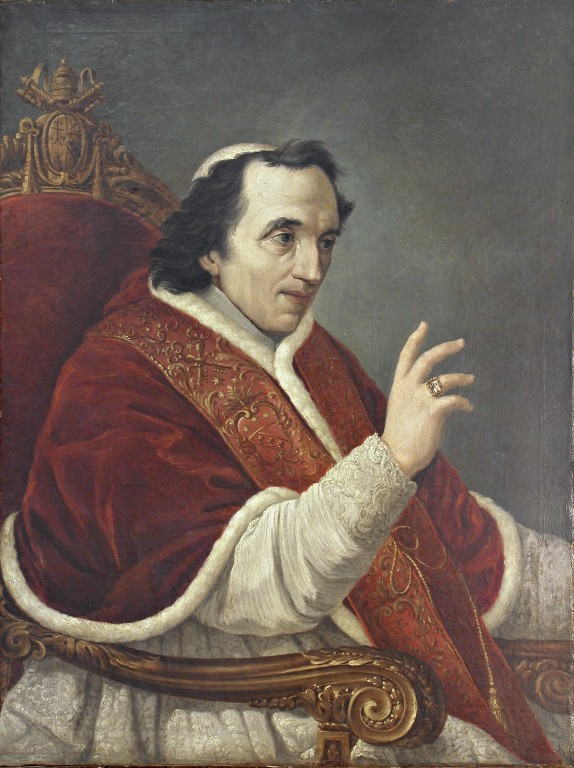
Albèri's portrait of Pope Pius VII, c. 1849

Clemente Alberi (1803, Rimini – 1864, Bologna) was an Italian portrait painter; also known for his copies of Renaissance and Baroque works. Some sources give his birthplace as Bologna.

== Life and work ==
His first lessons came from his father, Francesco, who was a professor of painting at the Academy of Fine Arts of Bologna. While there, was awarded several prizes and developed a preference for portraits. Among the best known are those of Pope Pius VII (late 1820s); Pope Pius VIII (c. 1830); Countess Giulia Tomasi Amiani; and Countess Ersilia Turrini-Rossi Marsigli.

He also made celebrated copies, including one of the Last Communion of St. Jerome by Agostino Carracci, commissioned in 1825 for the church of San Girolamo della Certosa by Don Clemente Spada-Veralli (1778-1866), the Prince of Castel Viscardo. This is the first painting positively identified as his. He also created a Pietà by Guido Reni, completed around 1841, for the church of Santa Maria della Pietà; and a Santa Cecilia by Raphael (1861) for the church of San Giovanni in Monte.

Of his works that are neither portraits nor copies, one of the most familiar is Paolo and Francesca Surprised by Giancotto (1828). During the 1830s and 1840s, some of his works addressed the question of Italian unity, through literary and historical references.

In 1832, he became an art teacher Pesaro then, in 1839, succeeded his father at the Academy in Bologna; a position he held until 1860. Much of his tenure was tainted by some of his colleagues' opinion that he had obtained his professorship through nepotism, rather than merit.

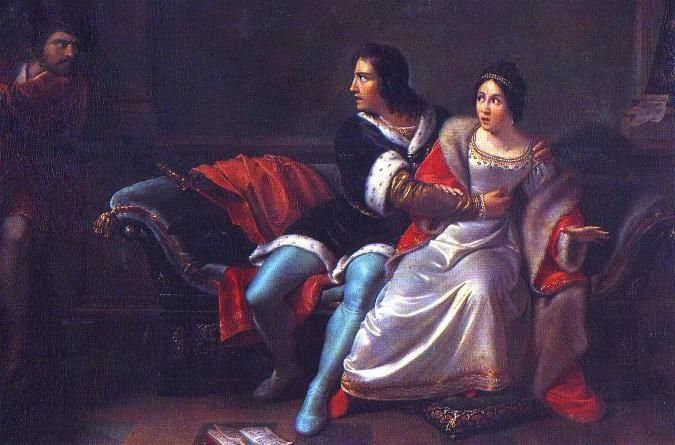
Paolo and Francesca Surprised by Gianciotto
