= Giuseppe Soleri Brancaleoni =

Italian painter (1750-1806)

Giuseppe Soleri Brancaleoni (1750–1806) was an Italian painter, active mainly in Rimini, painting sacred subjects.

== Biography ==
He is said to have been born to an aristocratic family. Among his pupils was Francesco Alberi. Soleri is best known for having painted a venerated image of the Madonna della Misericordia (1796) found in the church of Santa Chiara in Rimini. On May 11, 1850, the image was said to miraculously lift its gaze to the heavens. Pope Pius IX is said to have ordered investigations of the miracle by the Soleri painting. The painting was a copy of a Madonna painted by the local 18th-century painter Giovanni Battista Costa in 1730. That painting was said in 1796 to have moved its eyes; reports of Marian miracles increased in number in the months after the Napoleonic occupation of Northern Italy. Soleri painted his copy for his sister, a cloistered Clarissan nun, who was unable to travel outside the convent to see the Costa painting.

Soleri also painted an Assumption of the Virgin for the church of Santa Maria in San Giovanni in Marignano and Madonna della Consolazione, now in Museo di Saludecio e del Beato Amato.
