= Ippolito Bentivoglio =

Marchese Ippolito Bentivoglio d'Aragone (... - 4 February 1685), son of Marchese Cornelio Bentivoglio, was an Italian nobleman from the House of Bentivoglio in Ferrara, who is known as a libretto writer. His texts were turned into operas premiered in Ferrara at the Accademia dello Spirito Santo (established in 1597 by the Bentivoglios) with music by Giovanni Legrenzi for Nino il giusto (1662), Achille in Sciro (1663, again performed in 1664 and 1665 in Venice) and Zenobia e Radamisto (1665). His oratorium Oratorio del giuditio, also with music by Legrenzi, premiered in Austria in 1665. In 1664 he wrote La Filli di Tracia which was set to music by Andrea Mattioli.

Bentivoglio was married to Lucrezia Pio di Savoia. They had a daughter Mattilda, who married Marchese Mario Calcagnini, and three sons: Marchese Luigi Bentivoglio (1666–1744); Cornelio Bentivoglio (27 March 1668 - 30 December 1732)), who later became a cardinal; and Ascanio Bentivoglio (1673-1719), knight in the Order of Malta.
