= Santa Chiara, Rimini =

Church building in Rimini, Italy

Santa Chiara also known as the Santuario Madonna della Misericordia or Sanctuary of the Mater Misericordia is a Baroque-style Roman Catholic church located in via Santa Chiara #28 in Rimini, Italy. The church is best known for housing a venerated icon of the Madonna that has putatively moved its eyes for many believers.

== History ==
A church at the site was present by the 14th-century, the church was attached to the Convent of the Poor Clares, which was refurbished in Neoclassical style in 1852, with the interior decoration continuing till 1875 under Bilancioni and Ravegnani.

The main altarpiece is the venerated Madonna (1796) painted by Giuseppe Soleri Brancaleoni. On 11-12 May 1850, the eyes on this painting were seen to move skyward; the miracle was observed by many. The painting is now housed in a frame of gilded wood with angels holding a cornice of valuable stones and metals, donated to the church by August 1850 by Pope Pius IX. This was done after a large commission examined the veracity of the events. This pope would pronounce and define the dogma of the Immaculate Conception.

Bilancioni painted the Glory in the apse of the main chapel and the chiaroscuro medallions with Prophets in the cupola. The ornamentation are by Ravegnani. In the larger chapel is a canvas depicting St Clare Scatters the Saracens by Angelo Sarzetti, and a Resurrection with Saints by Viviani, a pupil of Barocci.

According to tradition, St Francis himself stayed at the site of the Convent. In December 1655, Christina, former queen of Sweden stayed at the monastery on her way to Rome.
