= Félix-Henri Giacomotti =

French painter (1828-1909)

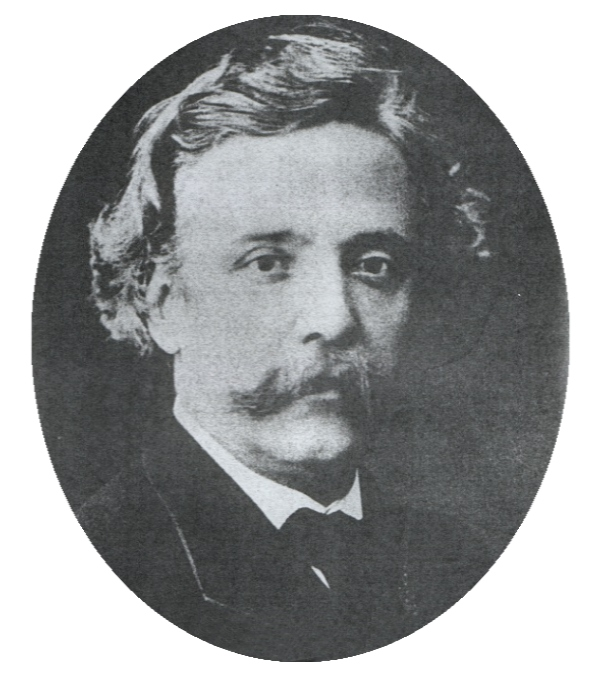
Félix-Henri Giacomotti (date unknown)

Félix-Henri Giacomotti (19 November 1828 – 10 May 1909) was a French painter and muralist of Italian ancestry who specialized in historical and religious works.

== Biography ==
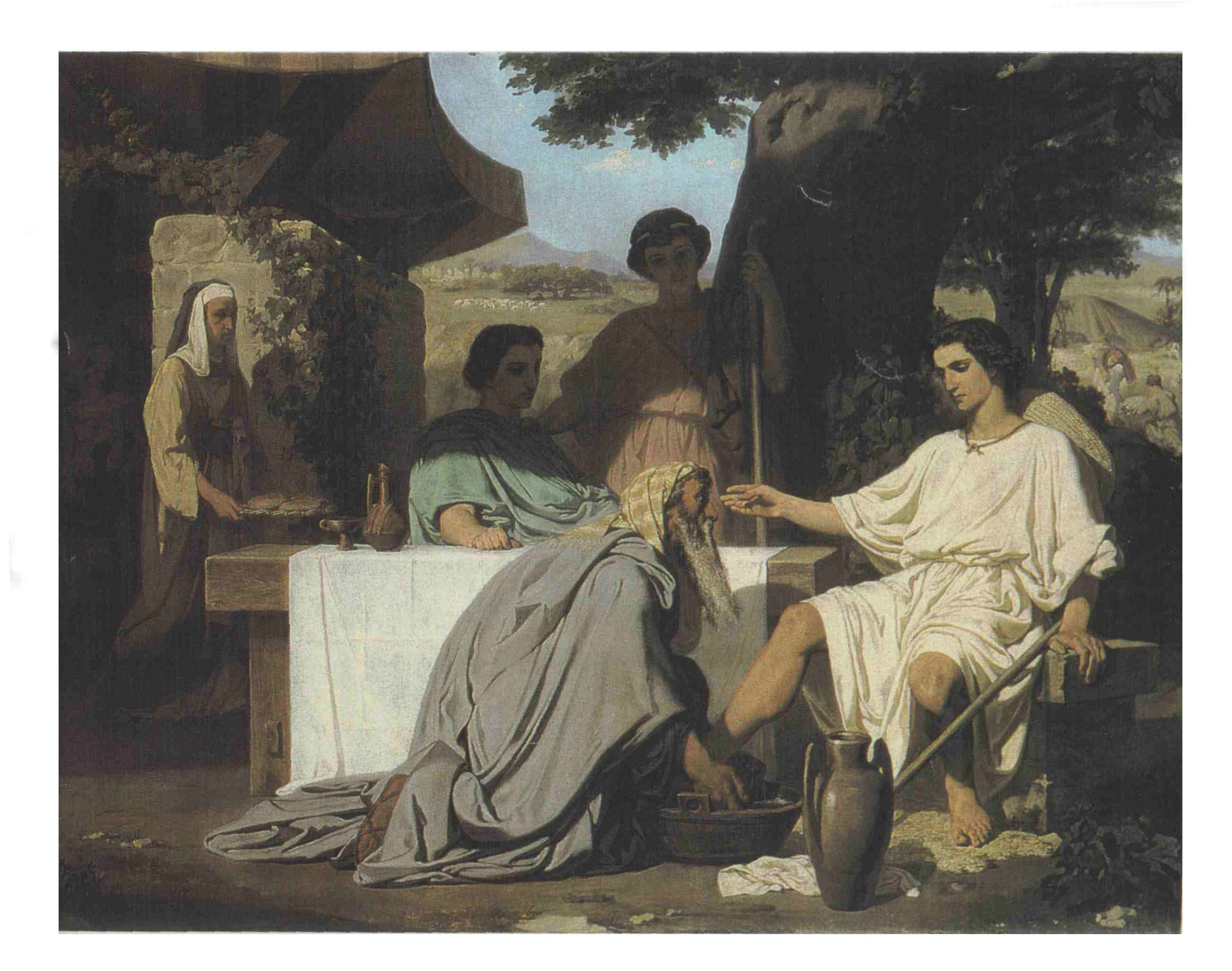
Abraham Washing the Feet of his Three Visitors, 1854

He was born in Quingey. His parents were from Italy and he became a naturalized French citizen in 1849. His first studies were at the art school in Besançon. He also took private lessons from Edouard Baille, who encouraged him to enter the École des Beaux-Arts. In 1850, he enrolled there and worked in the studios of François-Édouard Picot.

In 1854, he was awarded the Prix de Rome in history painting for his depiction of Abraham washing the feet of his three angelic visitors. He lived at the Villa Medici in from 1855 to 1860 and studied at the French Academy in Rome with Jean-Victor Schnetz. Upon returning, he held his first exhibit at the Salon and continued to exhibit annually until his death.

He was given numerous commissions, including murals for the ceiling of the Musée du Luxembourg and a depiction of the Holy Family at rest in the north transept of the Church of Notre-Dame-des-Champs. His rendition of Saint Martin sharing his cloak may be seen in the Church of Quingey. It is said that the Mayor served as the model for Saint Martin.

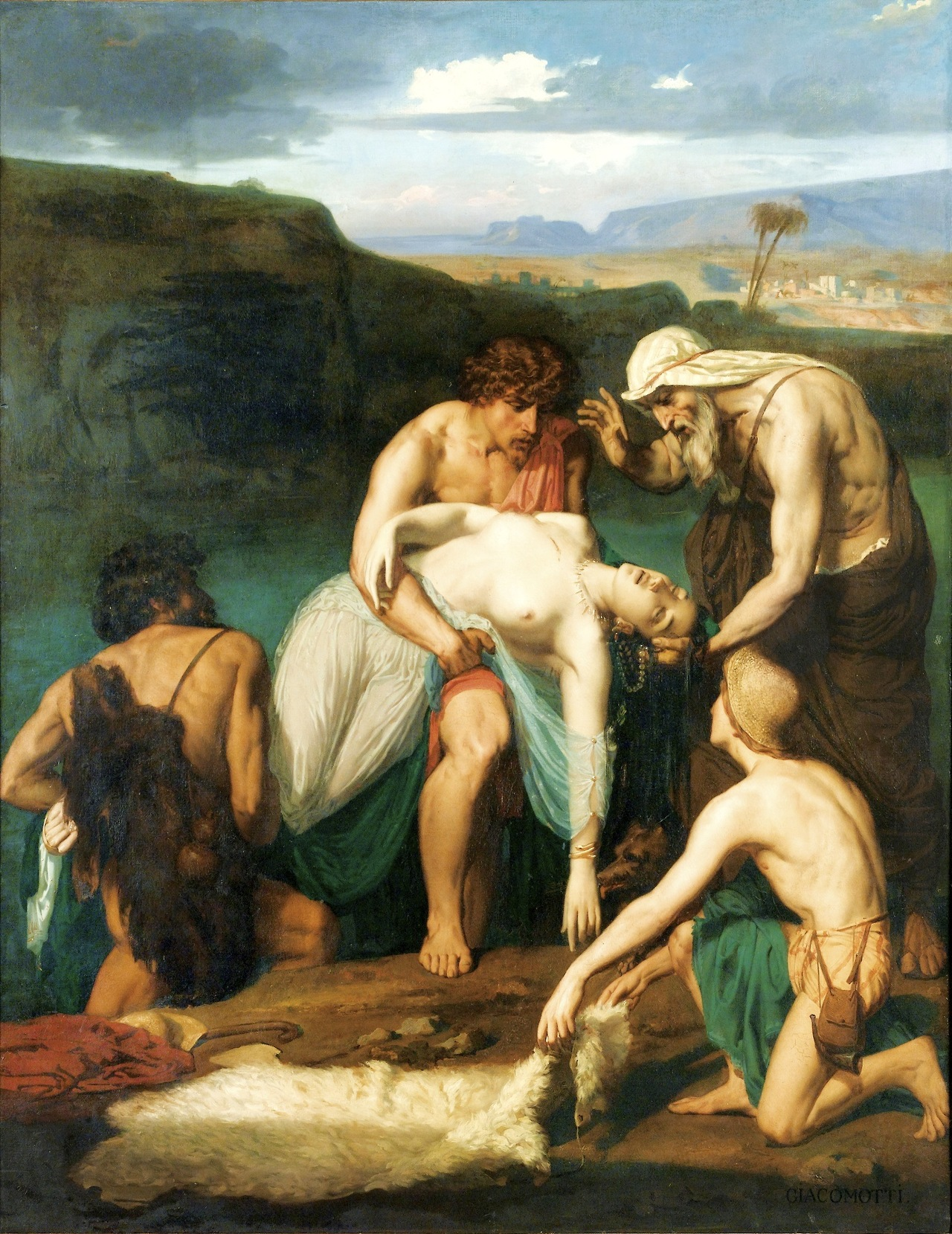
Zenobia Discovered on the Banks of the Araxes, 1850

Later, he was appointed director of the municipal school of fine arts in Besançon and Curator of the Museum of Fine Arts and Archaeology, a position he held for life. Following his marriage to a woman from Étampes, he became a conservator at the museum there. In 1867, he was named a Knight of the Légion d’Honneur.

Although best known for his historical and religious paintings, he also did numerous nudes in the style of his friend, William Bouguereau. During the troubles of the 1870s, he supported himself by painting portraits. Giacomotti died in 1909 in Besançon. A major retrospective of his work was held in 2005.
