= Rhadamistus =

King of Armenia (51–53, 54–55)

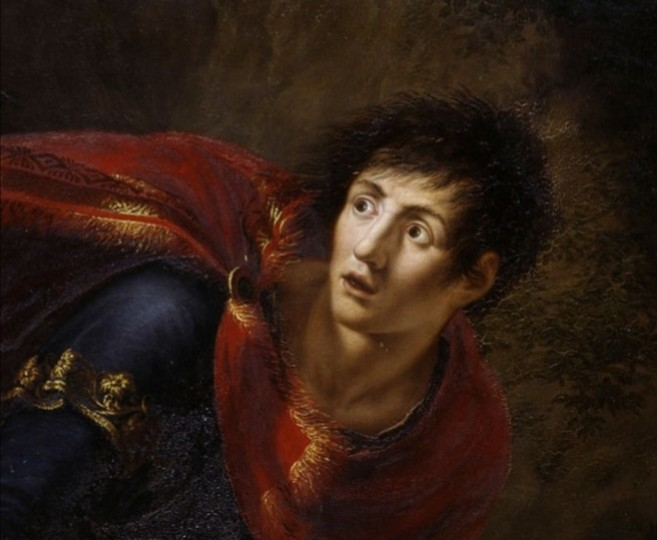
- Rhadamistus by Francesco Alberi

King of Armenia
- 1st Reign: 51–53
- Predecessor: Mithridates
- Successor: Tiridates I
- 2nd Reign: 54–55
- Predecessor: Tiridates I
- Successor: Tiridates I
- Born: Kingdom of Iberia
- Died: 58; Kingdom of Iberia
- Spouse: Zenobia of Armenia
- Issue: unknown son
- Dynasty: Pharnavazid
- Father: Pharasmanes I
- Mother: Daughter of Tigranes IV

Rhadamistus (died 58) was a royal prince of the Pharnavazid dynasty of Iberia who reigned over the Kingdom of Armenia from 51 to 53 and 54 to 55. He was considered a usurper and tyrant, who was overthrown in a rebellion supported by the Parthian Empire.

== Life ==
Rhadamistus was the eldest son of King Pharasmanes I of Iberia. His mother, whose name is not preserved, was an Armenian princess of the Artaxiad dynasty, daughter of Tigranes IV and his sister-wife Erato. Rhadamistus was known for his ambition, valor, extraordinary strength and size of body, and good looks. Although the Kingdom of Iberia was too small to satisfy him on its own, he was nonetheless openly impatient to inherit it from his aging father. Pharasmanes, fearing an attempt to usurp the throne, diverted Rhadamistus by convincing him to conquer the Kingdom of Armenia, then ruled by Pharasmanes' brother Mithridates. To conduct reconnaissance, Rhadamistus pretended that he was at feud with his father and stepmother and went to the court of Mithridates, who received him like a son and with an excessive kindness. Rhadamistus completed his inspection, declared that he had reconciled with his father, and returned to Iberia to set war plans in motion. Meanwhile Pharasmanes had invented a pretext for war: when he was fighting with the king of the Caucasian Albanians and appealing to the Romans for help, his brother had opposed him, and the conflict was to be called revenge for that opposition.

Pharasmanes gave his son a large Iberian army, who by a sudden invasion forced Mithridates to take shelter in the fortress of Gorneas, which had a strong Roman garrison under the command of Caelius Pollio. Rhadamistus opened negotiations with his uncle, claiming to be kindly disposed towards him because of their ties of blood and because of his marriage to Mithridates' daughter Zenobia. Adding that the Iberians were not against peace, he urged Mithridates to show respect to the seniority of Pharasmanes and agree to a treaty. Pharasmanes by secret messages had told Rhadamistus to hurry on the siege by all possible means.

Later, Pollio, swayed by Rhadamistus' bribery, threatened that the Roman garrison might abandon the fortress. Under this compulsion, Mithridates agreed to surrender to his nephew. Still treating his uncle with feigned respect, Rhadamistus promised that he would do him no harm either by the sword or by poison. He drew him into a neighboring woods, ostensibly to conduct a ritual sealing their alliance, then arrested him and bound him in chains. Mindful of his promise not to use a sword or poison, Rhadamistus had Mithridates smothered to death instead. Later he also killed the sons of Mithridates, for having shed tears over their father's death, and Mithridates' wife, who was Rhadamistus' own sister.

Rhadamistus became King of Armenia in 51. The Romans made a symbolic demand that Pharasmanes withdraw from Armenian territory and remove his son, but officially they had chosen not to aid their Armenian allies; one councilor declared that "any crime in a foreign country was to be welcomed with joy". Despite this, the Roman governor of Cappadocia, Paelignus, invaded Armenia and ravaged the country. Gaius Ummidius Durmius Quadratus, governor of Syria, sent a force to restore order, but was recalled so as not to provoke a war with Parthia. Consequently, King Vologases I, having recently ascended the Parthian throne, saw an opportunity to detach Armenia from the dominion of Rome and add it to his own, thus advancing his reputation and providing a principality for his brother Tiridates. He sent his large army into Armenia in 51, driving out the Iberians in 53. Rhadamistus regained control after an outbreak of plague forced the Parthians to withdraw. He now viewed the Armenians' loyalty as permanently suspect, and began punishing cities that had surrendered to the Parthians, eventually provoking a revolt which replaced him with the Parthian prince Tiridates I in 55.

Rhadamistus escaped back to Iberia. His wife Zenobia accompanied him for the first part of the journey, but she was pregnant and unable to bear a long ride on horseback. Rather than impede the escape, or be left behind and captured, she told her husband to kill her. Impressed by Zenobia's bravery, Rhadamistus consented, stabbing her and dropping her in the river Araxes. She survived her wounds and was rescued by peasants, who sent her to Artaxata. Upon his return to his father's domains in 58, Rhadamistus was executed for treason, ending Pharasmanes' fears of usurpation and demonstrating Iberian loyalty to Rome, and in particular to Emperor Nero. Pharasmanes died later in the same year and was succeeded by his second son Mihrdat, brother of Rhadamistus.

== In art ==
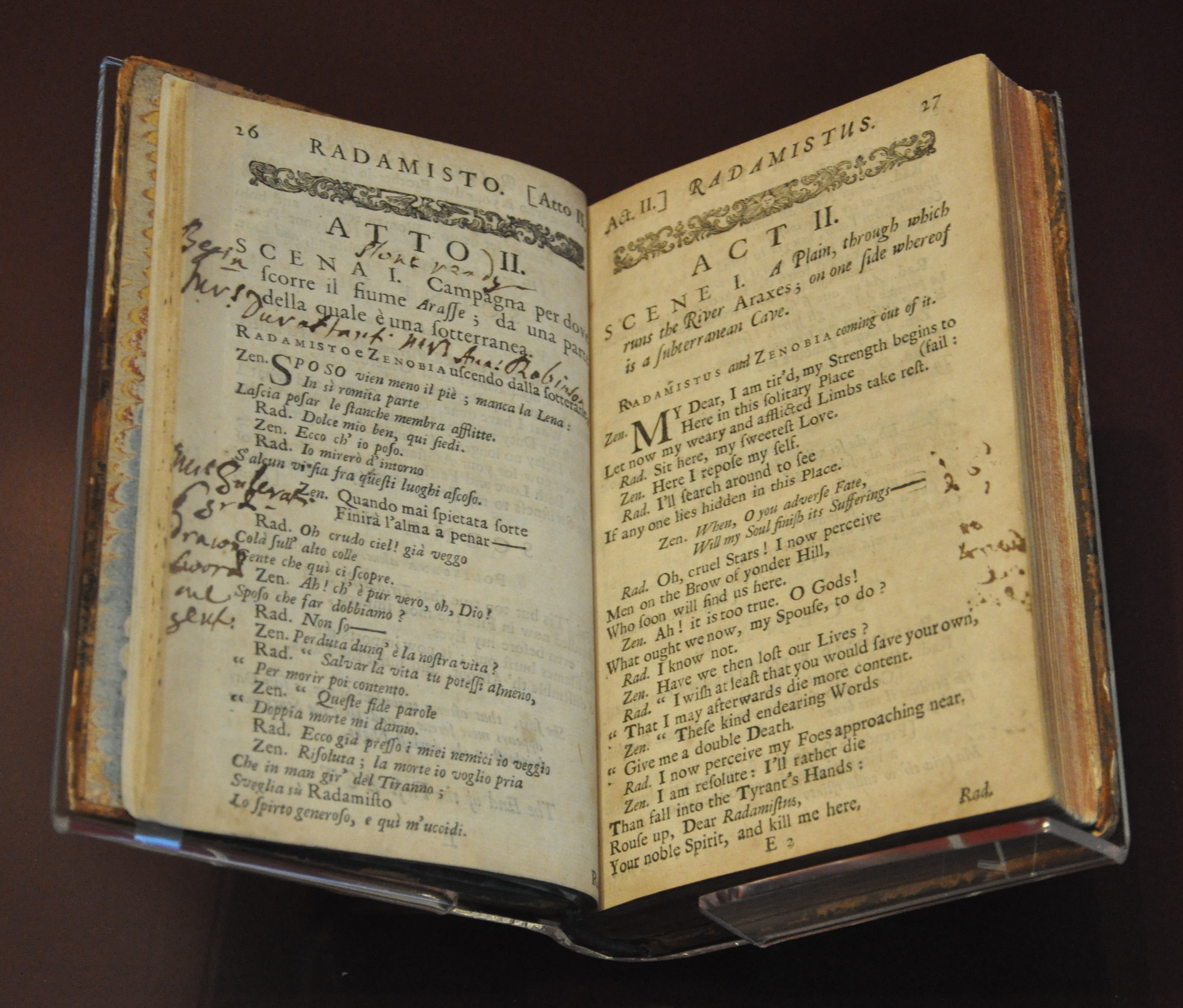
Opera Radamisto by George Frideric Handel, 1720.

=== Paintings ===
- "Radamisto uccide Zenobia" by Luigi Sabatelli (1803).
- "Rhadamistes and Zenobia" by Jean-Joseph Taillasson.
- Shepherds Find Zenobia on the Banks of the Araxes by Paul Baudry (1850)
- "Shepherds Find Zenobia on the Banks of the Araxes" by William-Adolphe Bouguereau (1850)
- "Radamisto in atto di spingere Zenobia ferita nel fiume Arasse" by Francesco Alberi.
- "Queen Zenobia Thrown Into the Araxes River" by François-Nicolas Chifflart.
- "Rhadamiste poignarde sa femme Zénobie" by Etienne Meslier.

=== Operas ===
- "L’Amour tyrannique" by Georges de Scudéry (1638).
- "Zenobia e Radamisto" by Giovanni Legrenzi (1665).
- "Radamisto" by Tomaso Albinoni (1698).
- "L'amor tirannico, o Zenobia" by Domenico Lalli (1710).
- "Rhadamiste et Zénobie" by Prosper Jolyot de Crébillon (1711).
- "Radamisto" by George Frideric Handel (1720).
- "Radamisto" by Nicola Francesco Haym.

=== Plays ===
- Unfinished play "Rodamist i Zenobiya" by Alexander Griboyedov.

== Gallery ==
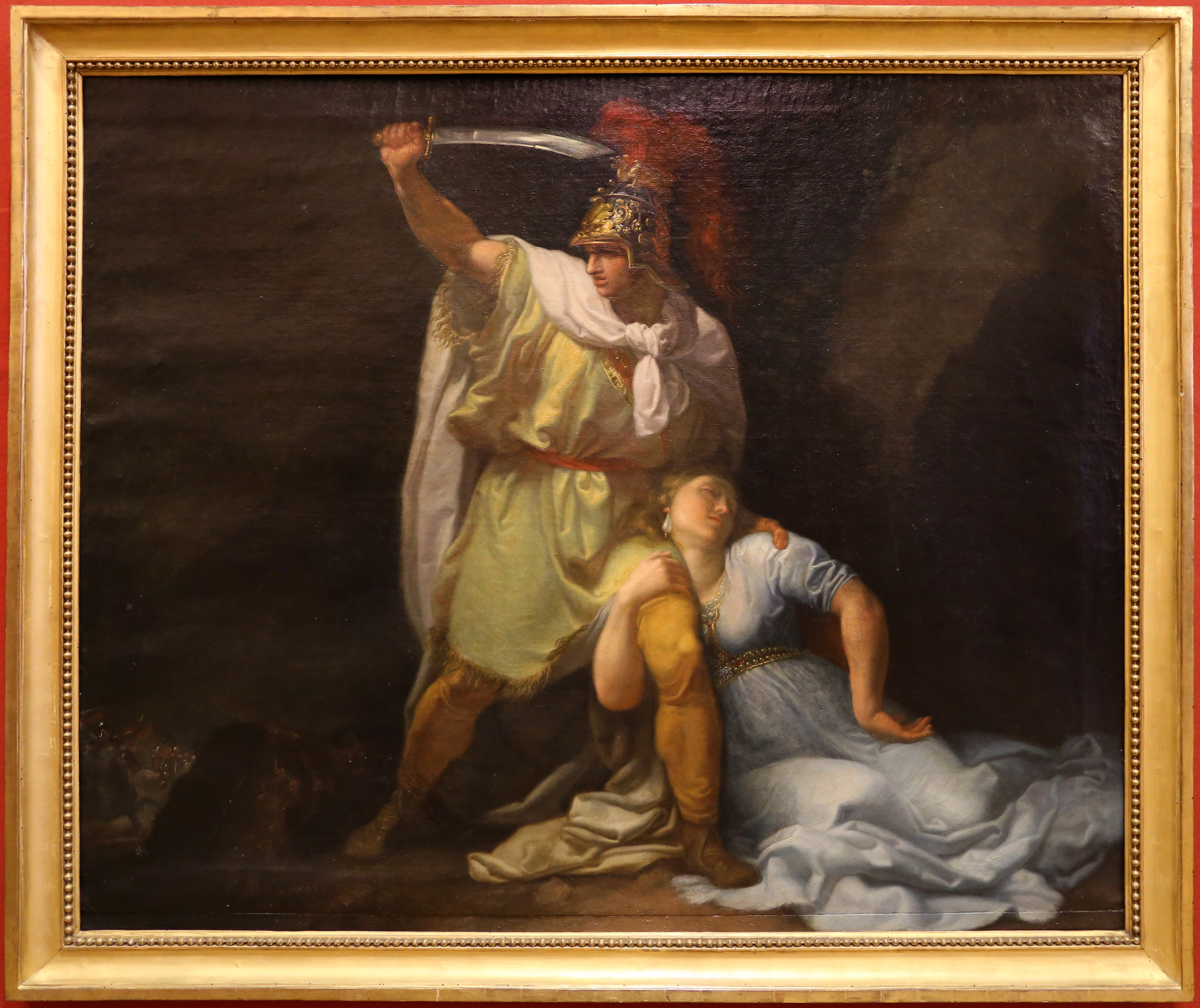
Radamisto killing Zenobia by
Luigi Sabatelli

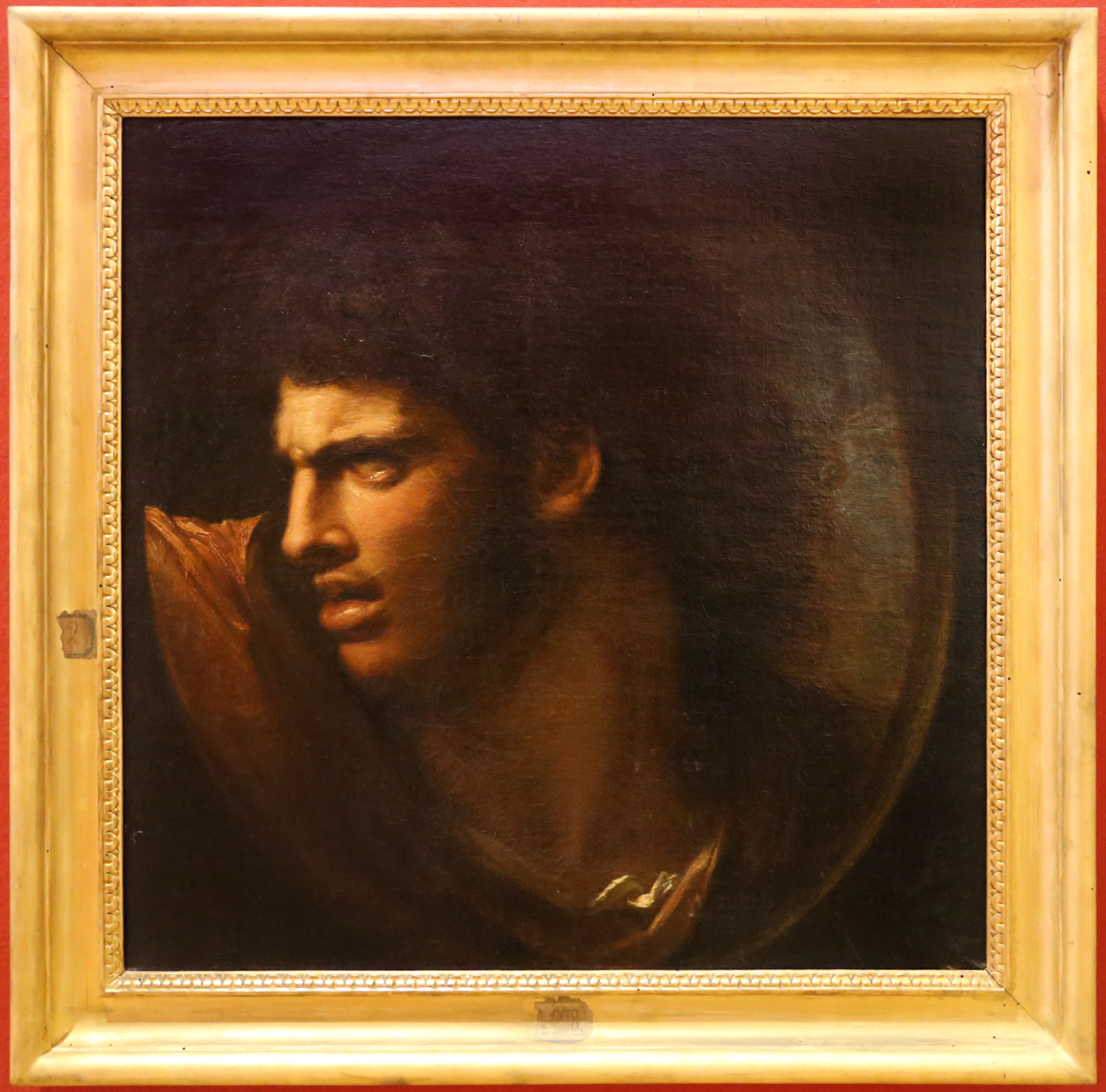
Radamisto by Luigi Sabatelli

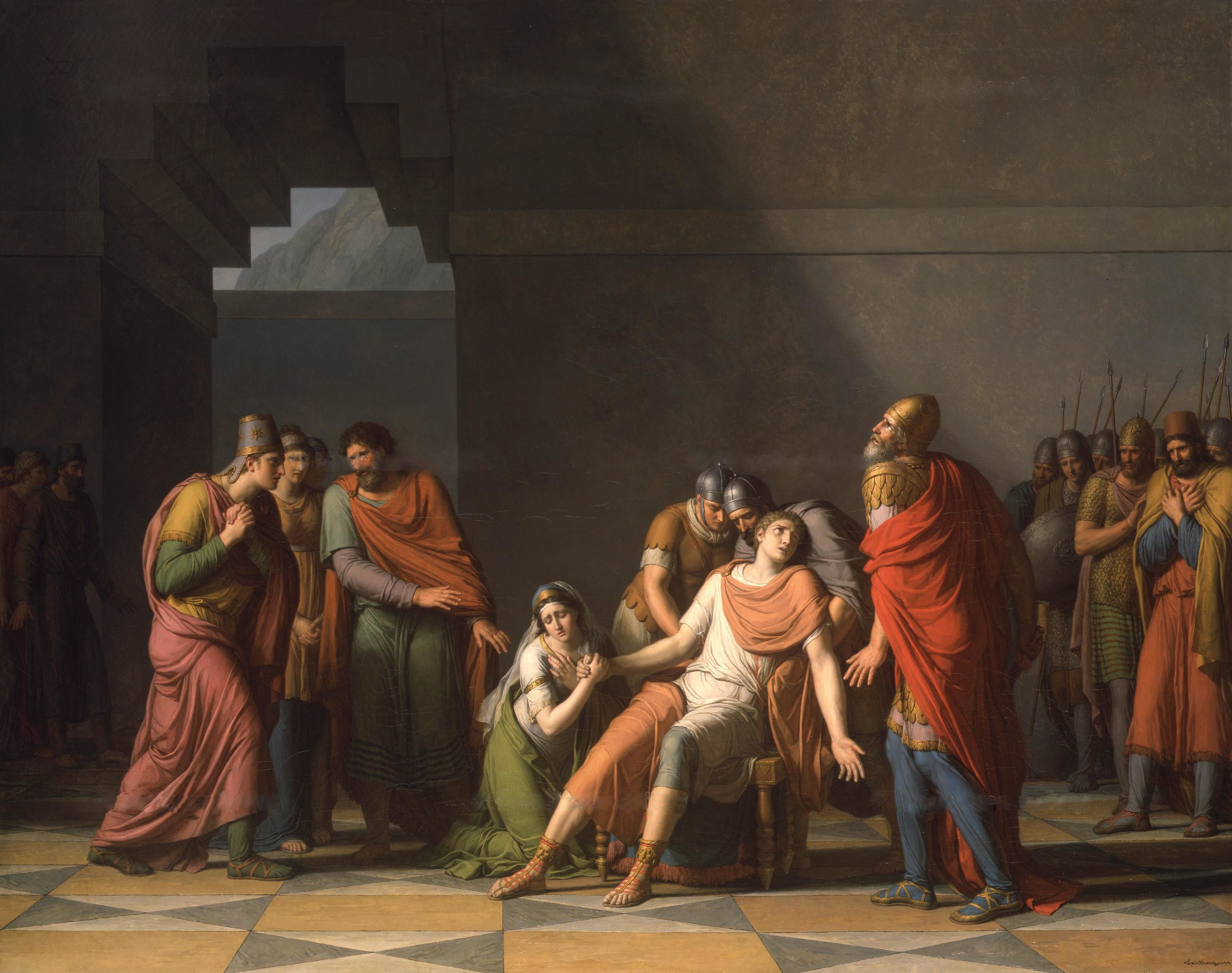
Rhadamistes and Zenobia by
Jean-Joseph Taillasson

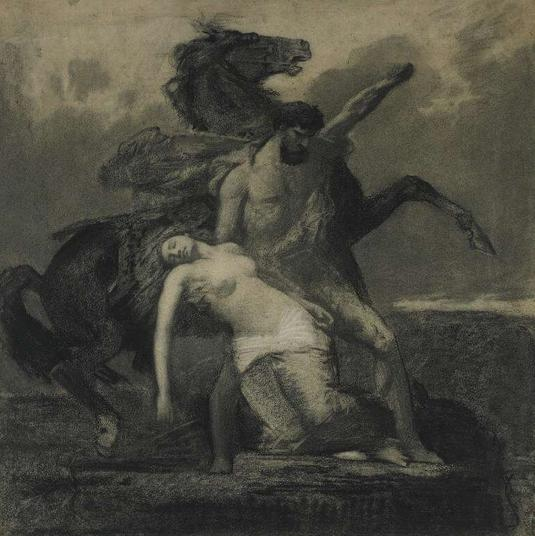
Rhadamistus in Queen Zenobia Thrown Into the Araxes River by
François Chifflart

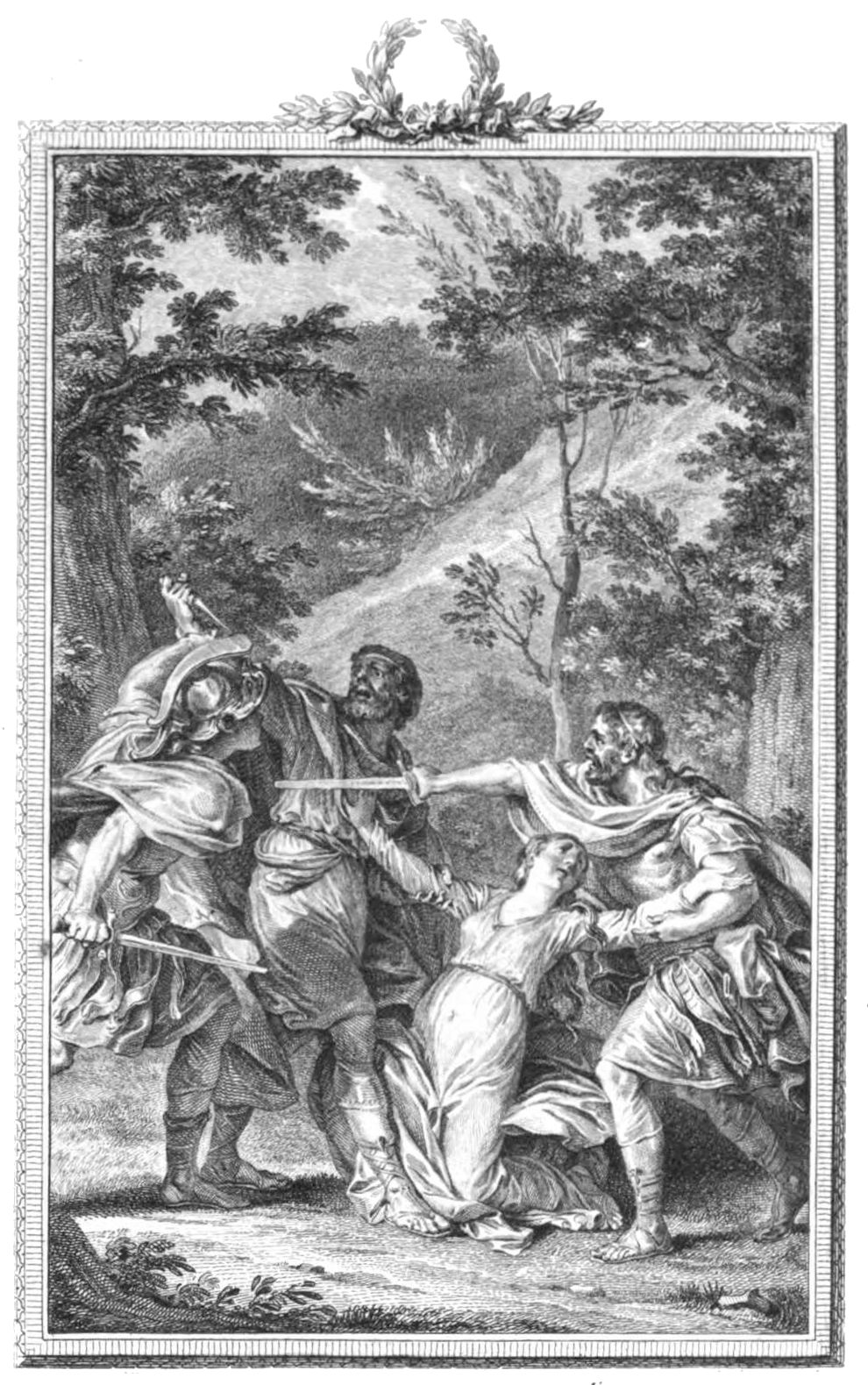
Rhadamistus from the opera of Pietro Metastasio

== Sources ==
- Edwell, Peter (2021). Rome and Persia at War: Imperial Competition and Contact, 193–363 CE. Routledge.
- Tacitus, Annals, Book XII-XIII
- Javakhishvili, Ivane (2012), History of the Georgian Nation, Vol. 1
- Crévier, Jean-Baptiste Louis (1814) L'Histoire des empereurs des Romains
- Bunson, Matthew (2009) Encyclopedia of the Roman Empire
- Toumanoff, Cyril (1969), Chronology of the early Kings of Iberia, Vol. 25
- Suny, Grigor Ronald (1994), The Making of the Georgian Nation: 2nd edition, Indiana University Press, ISBN 0-253-20915-3
- Rawlinson, George (2012) The Seven Great Monarchies Of The Ancient Eastern World
- Cantù, Cesare (1847) Historia universal
- Tomlins, Frederick (1844) A Universal History of the Nations of Antiquity

Rhadamistus Pharnavazid dynasty Born: NA Died: 58 AD
Preceded by none	Crown Prince of Iberia ? – 51 AD	Succeeded by Mihrdat I
Regnal titles
Preceded by Mithridates I	King of Armenia; 51 – 53; 54 – 55 (2nd reign)	Succeeded by Tiridates I
Preceded by Tiridates I	King of Armenia; 51 – 53; 54 – 55 (2nd reign)	Succeeded by Tiridates I
