= Mithridates of Armenia =

King of Armenia (35–37, 42–51)

Mithridates

King of Armenia
- Reign: 35–37, 41–51
- Predecessor: Orodes
- Successor: Rhadamistus
- Born: 1st-century BC; Mtskheta, Kingdom of Iberia
- Died: AD 51
- Spouse: Daughter of Pharasmanes I
- Issue: Zenobia of Armenia
- Dynasty: Pharnavazid
- Father: Kartam of Colchis
- Mother: Daughter of Pharnavaz II

Mithridates of Armenia (fl. 1st century) was a Pharnavazid prince of the Kingdom of Iberia who served as a King of Armenia under the protection of the Roman Empire.

== Biography ==
Mithridates was installed by Roman emperor Tiberius, who invaded Armenia in AD 35. When the Parthian prince Orodes, son of Artabanus II of Parthia, attempted to dispossess Mithridates of his newly acquired kingdom, Mithridates led a large Armenian and Iberian army and defeated the Parthians in a pitched battle.

Around AD 37, the new emperor Caligula had Mithridates arrested, but Claudius restored him to the Armenian throne in AD 42. Subsequently, Mithridates' relations with his brother Pharasmanes I deteriorated to the point where the Iberian king instructed his son, Rhadamistus, to invade Armenia.

Betrayed by his Roman commanders, Mithridates surrendered in the Siege of Garni. Roman historian Cassius Dio reports a likely apocryphal confrontation of Mithridates and Claudius in Rome.

Mithridates, king of the Iberians, having been defeated in a conflict with a Roman army and despairing of his life, begged that a hearing should be granted him in order that he might not be summarily executed or led in the triumphal procession. When his request had been granted, Claudius received him in Rome, seated on a tribunal, and addressed threatening words to him. But the king answered boldly, and ended by saying: "I was not brought to you; I came. If you doubt it, release me and try to find me."

In 51 AD, Mithridates was murdered by Rhadamistus, who usurped the crown and married his cousin Zenobia, Mithridates' daughter.

== Bibliography ==
- Dio Cassius (1925). Roman History, Volume VIII: Books 61–70. Loeb Classical Library 176. Translated by Cary, Earnest; Foster, Herbert B. Cambridge, MA: Harvard University Press.
- Edwell, Peter (2021). Rome and Persia at War: Imperial Competition and Contact, 193–363 CE. Routledge.
- Grousset, R. (1947). Histoire de l'Arménie des Origines à 1071 [History of Armenia from its origins to 1071] (in French). Paris: Payot.

Regnal titles
Preceded by Arsaces I	King of Armenia; 35 – 37; 42 – 51 (2nd reign)	Succeeded by Orodes I
Preceded by Orodes I	King of Armenia; 35 – 37; 42 – 51 (2nd reign)	Succeeded by Rhadamistus I
