= Shepherds Find Zenobia on the Banks of the Araxes =

Painting by William-Adolphe Bouguereau

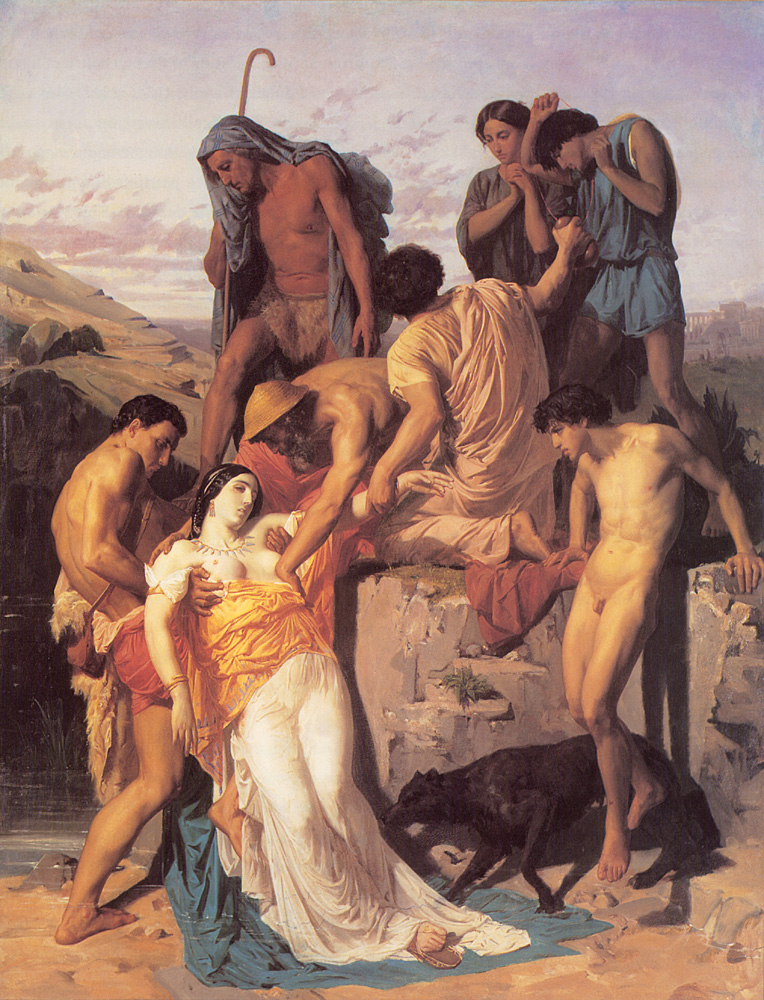
- Artist: William-Adolphe Bouguereau
- Year: 1850
- Medium: oil on canvas
- Dimensions: 147 cm × 113 cm (58 in × 44 in)
- Location: Beaux-Arts de Paris, Paris (France)

Shepherds Find Zenobia on the Banks of the Araxes is an 1850 oil-on-canvas painting by the French academic painter William Bouguereau, now in the Beaux-Arts de Paris.

Its subject is drawn from Tacitus's Histories (XII.51), in which Rhadamistus, king of Armenia, tried to kill his wife Zenobia to prevent her falling into enemy hands and then threw her into the river Araxes before riding on. Still alive, she was found by shepherds "in a quiet backwater", who bandaged her wounds and took her to Artaxata, whence she travelled on to meet Tiridates.

Preparatory drawings for the work survive in the École des beaux-arts and the Musée d'Orsay. Paul Baudry won the main Prix de Rome for 1850 with his Zenobia Found by the Shepherds, but Bouguereau won a consolation second prize, which he used to pay for a stay at the Villa Medici.
