= Bartolomeo Cittadella =

Italian painter (1636-1704)

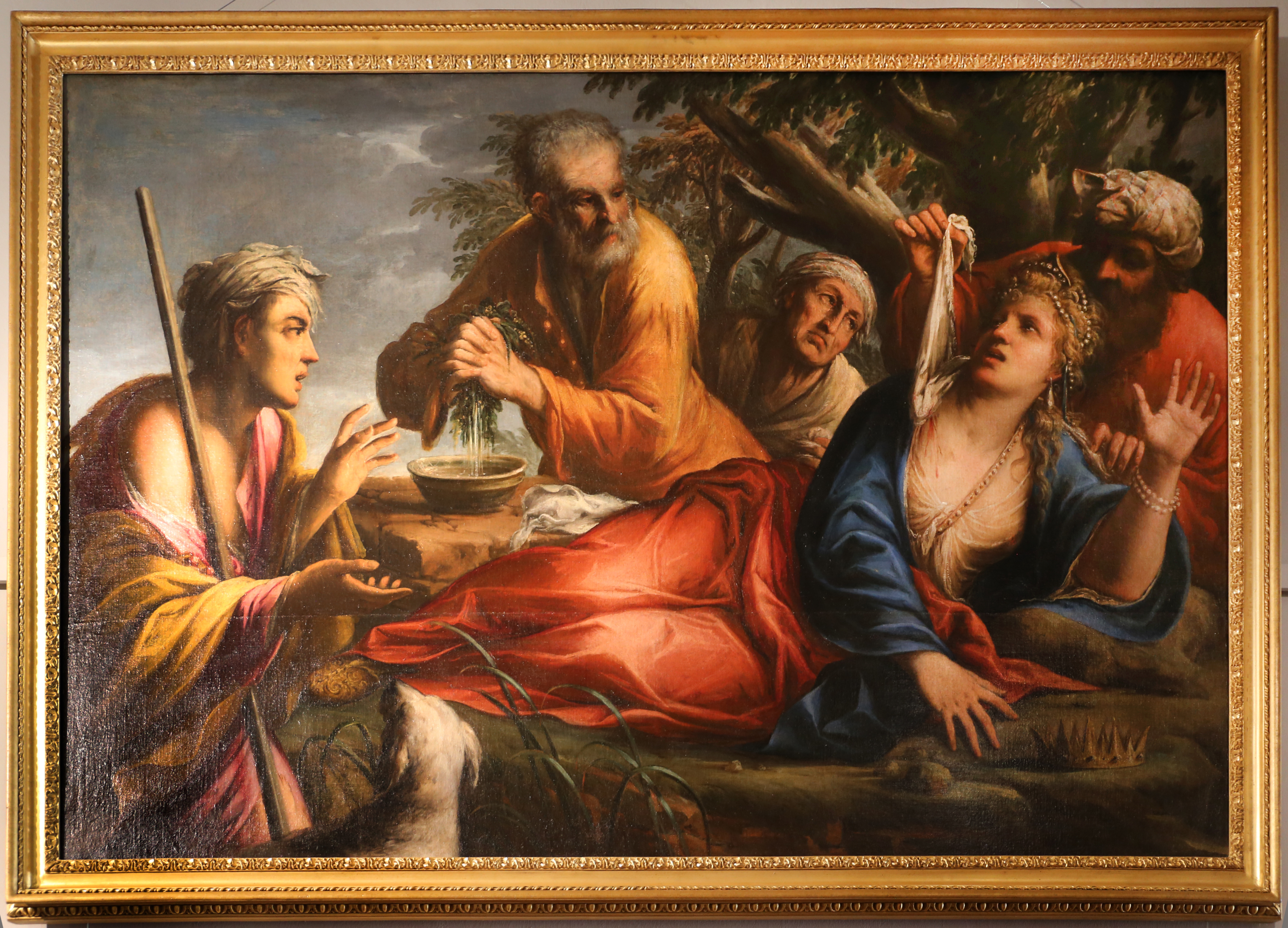
Zenobia and the shepherds, Musée Fesch, Ajaccio

Bartolomeo Cittadella (1636–1704), a painter of the Venetian school, who, according to Guarienti, flourished at Vicenza in the latter part of the seventeenth century. He wrought with great rapidity, and Lanzi says there are a multitude of his works at Vicenza, in which he imitated the styles of Paolo Veronese and the younger Palma. Probably from this fact he did not acquire much distinction.
