= Ambrogio Minoja =

Composer and professor of music (1752-1825)

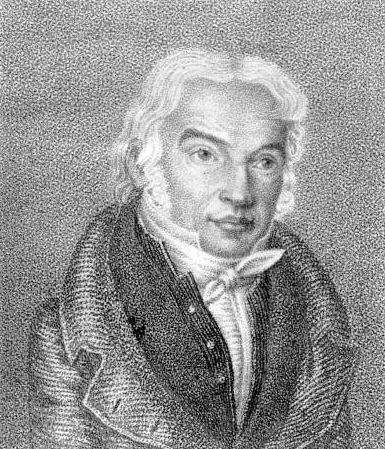
- Ambrogio Minoja on a stipple engraving by Luigi Rados (1773–1840).
- Born: 22 October 1752; Ospedaletto Lodigiano
- Died: 3 August 1825 (aged 72); Naples
- Occupation: Composer
- Style: Early Romanticism

Ambrogio Minoja (22 October 1752 – 3 August 1825) was a classical composer from Italy, born in Ospedaletto Lodigiano, in the territory of Lodi, in the region of Lombardy. He was professor of composition and writer on vocal music, having written Solfeggi, and Lettera sopra il canto (Luigi Mussi, Milan).

== Biography ==
Minoja began his musical studies when he was fourteen years old, acquiring further musical training from renowned professor Nicola Sala, in Naples. On his return to Milan from Rome in 1772, where he stayed for a short period of time, he was appointed first klavier player at the theatre, succeeding then Giovanni Battista Lampugnani as director of music. From 1789 to 1809 he was maestro al cembalo (Note: Maestro al cembalo means leader at the harpsichord. The term was commonly used in 18th-century operatic contexts.) at Teatro alla Scala (1789–1809). A highly esteemed composer, chapel-master and honorary member at the Royal Conservatory of Music in Milan, he became inspector of studies at the conservatory from 1814 to 1824.

== Musical works ==
Minoja was a composer of opera and church-music. He composed two operas, which were performed successfully, Tito nelle Gallie (1787) and Zenobia (1788), a march and a funeral symphony on the death of General Hoche, having him received then a gold medal from Napoleon Bonaparte, and four Quartets known by the title of I Divertimenti della Campagna.
