= Francesco Nenci =

Italian engineer

- Born: 2 January 1969 (age 57); Perugia, Italy
- Citizenship: Italian
- Occupation: Engineer
- Employer: Haas F1 Team
- Known for: Formula One engineer
- Title: Chief race engineer

Francesco Nenci (born 2 January 1969) is an Italian Formula One engineer. He is currently the chief race engineer at the Haas Formula One team.

== Career ==
Nenci studied Aeronautical Engineering at the Politecnico di Torino, specialising in aerodynamics. He began his motorsport career in 1997 as a Data Engineer with Coloni Motorsport, working in Formula 3000 on telemetry data analysis. In 1999, he joined the G-Tec Formula Nissan Team in Spain as Technical Director and Race Engineer, managing technical operations within the team.

Nenci started working in Formula One in 2002, joining the fledgling Toyota Racing team as a Data Engineer for Allan McNish. He subsequently took on system engineering responsibilities in 2003, before working as a Performance Engineer in 2004. Between 2005 and 2009, he served as a Race Engineer for Toyota, engineering Ralf Schumacher in 2005 - 2007 and then Timo Glock from 2008 - 2009.

After Toyota’s withdrawal from Formula One, Nenci joined Sauber Motorsport as a Race Engineer from 2009 to 2014, working with Kamui Kobayashi from 2010 - 2012 and then Esteban Gutiérrez for 2013 and the first rounds of 2014. He then moved to Marussia F1 Team, engineering Jules Bianchi to his and the teams maiden points in Monaco.

After the team ran into financial problems he moved to Trulli Formula E Team as Chief Engineer during the team’s 2014–15 campaign, taking responsibility for race engineering activities and chassis development processes. In 2015, he became Technical Director of Team Rosberg in DTM, working with Audi Sport machinery. He remained in the role until 2018.

Nenci joined Audi Sport GmbH in 2018, working initially as Formula E Race/Test Performance Team Leader and later as Driving Simulator Team Leader in 2021. From 2022 to 2024, he led Audi’s Dakar Performance group, overseeing performance targets for the company’s rally-raid programme.

In 2025, Nenci returned to Formula One as Chief Race Engineer at the Haas F1 Team, leading the trackside engineering team at the races.
