= Nicola Sala =

Italian opera composer and music theorist (1713–1801)

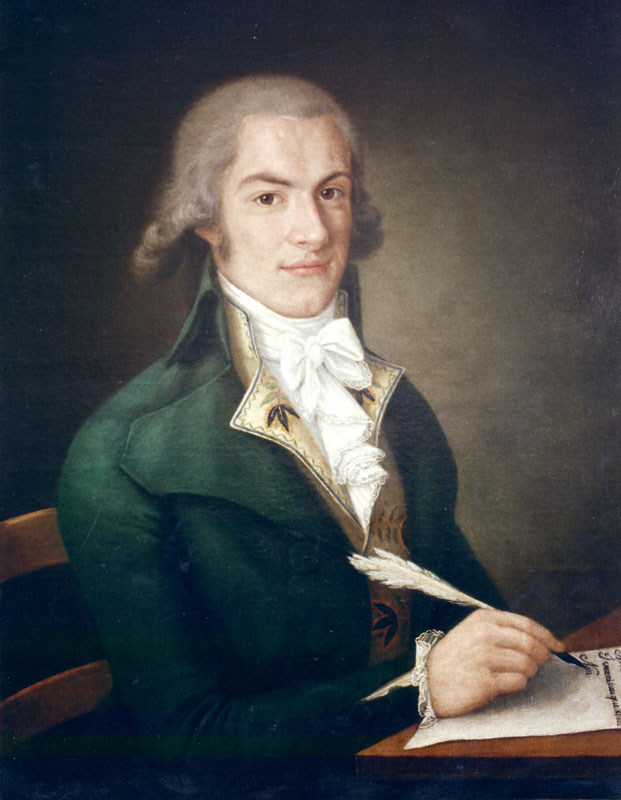
Nicola Sala

Nicola Sala (7 April 1713 – 31 August 1801) was an Italian composer and music theorist. He was born in Tocco Caudio and died in Naples. He was chapel-master and professor at Naples, having devoted himself to the collection of the finest models of printed music.

== Biography ==
Sala studied music in Naples at Conservatorio della Pietà dei Turchini from 1732 to 1740 under Nicola Fago and Leonardo Leo. Some of his pupils were Carlo Lenzi, Giuseppe Gherardeschi, Benedetto Neri, Étienne-Joseph Floquet, Adalbert Gyrowetz, Louis Julien Casels de Labarre, Ercole Paganini, Gaspare Spontini, and many others.

He probably wrote his first composition, the opera Vologeso, staged first in Rome, in 1737. In 1745 he was accepted as successor to Leo in the position of master of the royal chapel. In the sixties represented some of his works at the Teatro di San Carlo, including the drama Zenobia, composed by his pupil Ambrogio Minoja, was well received. In 1787 he became second master of the Pieta Turchini, where he stayed for 47 years as teacher and director of the conservatory.

He was one of the most important Neapolitan teachers, having taught many musical composers. He wrote several pedagogical treatises, including Regole del contrappunto pratico, published in Naples in 1794. He also wrote several operas, oratorios, masses and cantatas. His music was recently rediscovered by the Conservatory of Benevento, which has headed the institution and the local association Eufoniarché, producing his operas and oratorios each year with the help of palaeographers and Latin scholars of the University of Naples, Rome and Paris.

The well-regarded state-funded music conservatory Conservatorio Statale di Musica Nicola Sala in Benevento near Naples is named for him.

== Selected works ==
=== Operas ===
- Vologeso (opera seria, libretto by Apostolo Zeno, 1737, Rome)
- La Zenobia (opera seria, libretto by Pietro Metastasio, 1761, Naples)
- Demetrio (opera seria, libretto by Pietro Metastasio, 1762, Naples)
- Merope (opera seria, libretto by Apostolo Zeno, 1769, Naples)

=== Other musical works ===
- Giove, Pallade, Apollo (cantata, 1763, Naples)
- Il giudizio d'Apollo (serenade, libretto by Giovanni Fenizia, 1768, Naples)
- Erto, Ebone, Arminio (cantata, 1769, Naples)
- La bella eroina (prologue, 1769, Naples)
- Varie aria
- Judith seu Bethuliae liberatio-Giuditta ossia La Betulia liberata (oratorio, libretto by anonymous author, 2007, Benevento)

=== Theoretical works ===
- Regole del contrappunto pratico (1794, Naples)
- Principi di contrappunto
- Elementi per ben suonare il cembalo
- Disposizione a tre per introduzione alle fughe di tre parti
- Il modo di disporre a tre sopra la scala diatonica
- Disposizioni imitate a soggetto e contrasoggetto
- Fughe con soggetto e contrasoggetto a suono plagale
