= François Chifflart =

French painter, designer and engraver (1825-1901)

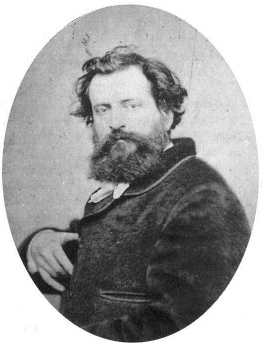
François Chifflart (date unknown)

François-Nicolas Chifflart (21 March 1825 – 19 March 1901) was a French painter, illustrator and etcher.

== Biography ==
He was born in Saint-Omer. His father was a locksmith who was also known for his skill as a carver and worked for Louis Fiolet, a notable manufacturer of earthenware tobacco pipes. He introduced his son to printmaking.

François began studying at the municipal school of design at an early age. In 1844, he entered the École des Beaux-arts and became a student of Léon Cogniet. He took third place in the competition for the Prix de Rome in 1850 for his painting Zénobie sur les bords de l'Araxe (Zenobia on the Banks of the Aras) then, the following year, was awarded first place for Périclès au lit de mort de son fils (Pericles at the Deathbed of His Son).

Shortly after, he rebelled against the Academicism of the time, focusing more on designing and engraving. His illustrations for Faust were especially notable and were praised by Baudelaire. Later, he made the acquaintance of Victor Hugo and began a new career as an illustrator in 1867. He helped design illustrations for Hugo's Toilers of the Sea (engraved by Fortuné Méaulle) and a new edition of The Hunchback of Notre-Dame.

He lost most of his clientele when he began to harshly criticize Napoleon III during the Franco-Prussian War, and sank into an oblivion from which he never fully recovered. Despite this, a street in Saint-Omer has been named after him. He died in 1901 in Paris.

== Selected works ==
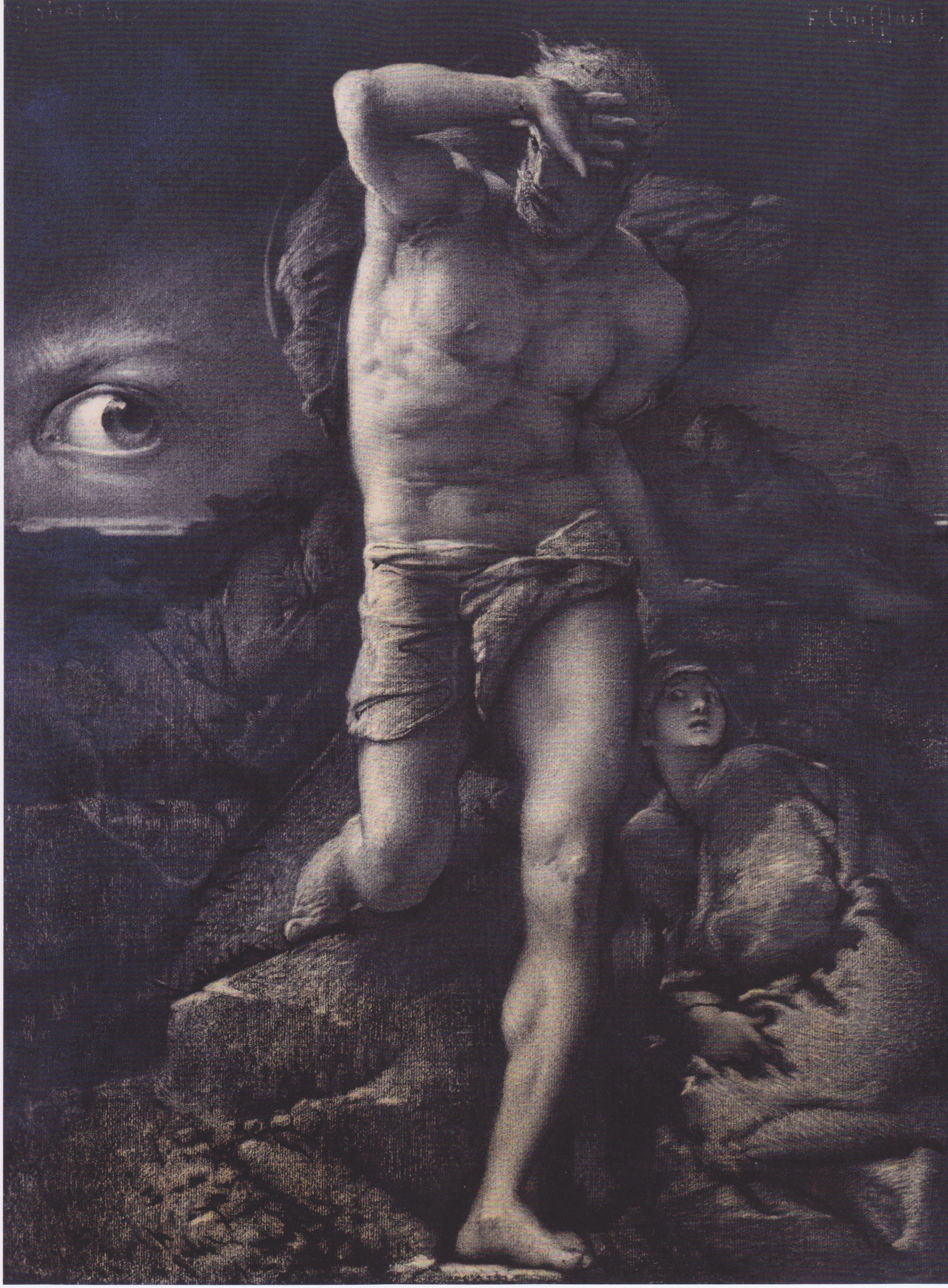
Conscience, from
La Légende des siècles

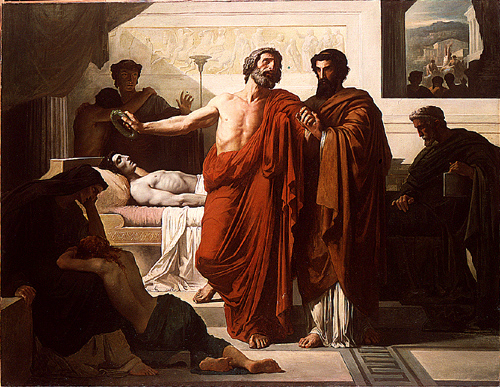
Pericles at the
Deathbed of his Son

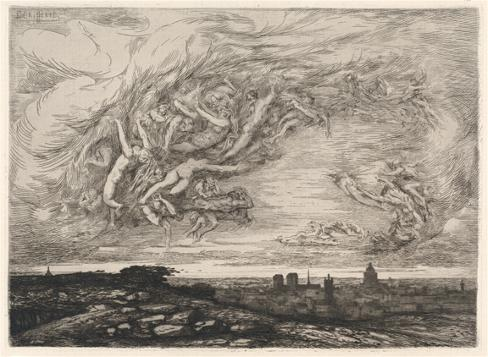
Cholera in Paris

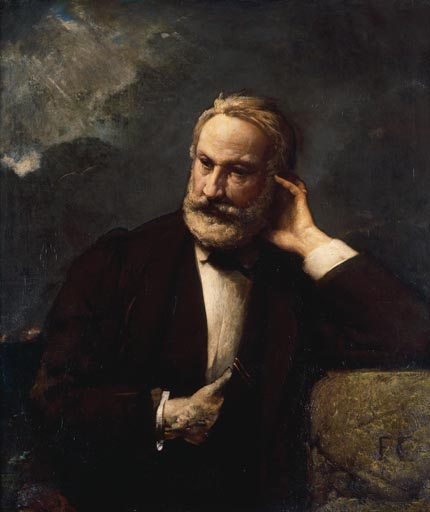
Portrait of Victor Hugo
