= Émile Lévy =

French painter (1826-1890)

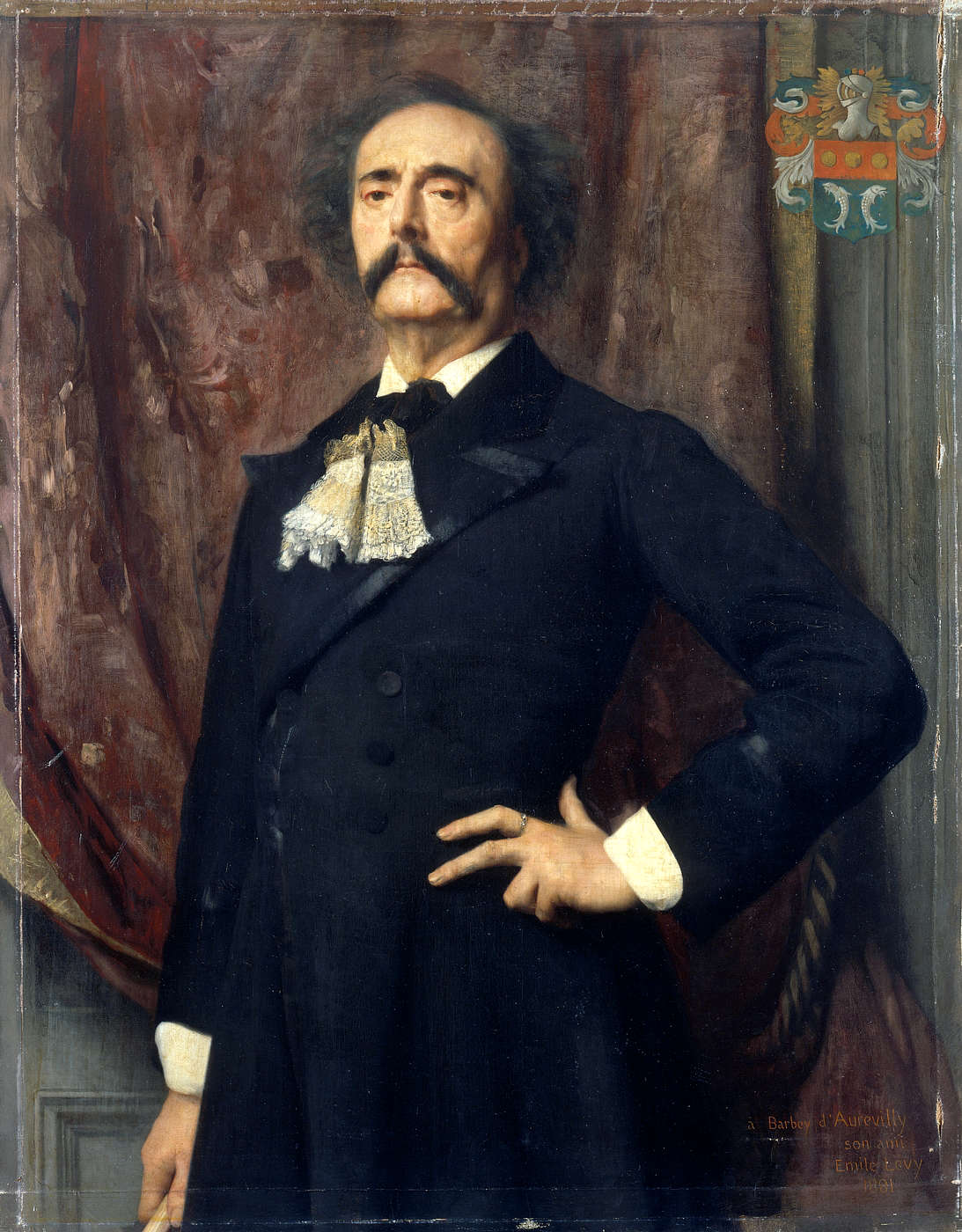
Émile Lévy, Portrait of Jules Barbey d'Aurevilly, 1882

Émile Lévy (August 29, 1826 in Paris – 1890) was a French genre and portrait painter.

== Biography ==
He was a pupil of François-Édouard Picot and Abel de Pujol. He also studied at the École des Beaux-Arts in Paris. He won the Grand Prix de Rome in 1854. On his return from Italy, he settled in Paris, and devoted himself to portrait painting. He exhibited in the Salon, receiving a first-class medal in 1878, and the Legion of Honor in 1867. Among the more important of his works are: “Noah Cursing Canaan” (1855); “Supper of the Martyrs” (1859); “Death of Orpheus” (1866), Luxembourg Museum; “Love and Folly” (1874); “Infancy” (1885); “The Elements,” Salon of Ministry of State, Louvre; “Presentation of the Virgin,” Trinity Church, Paris.
