= Francesco Alberi =

Italian painter (1765–1836)

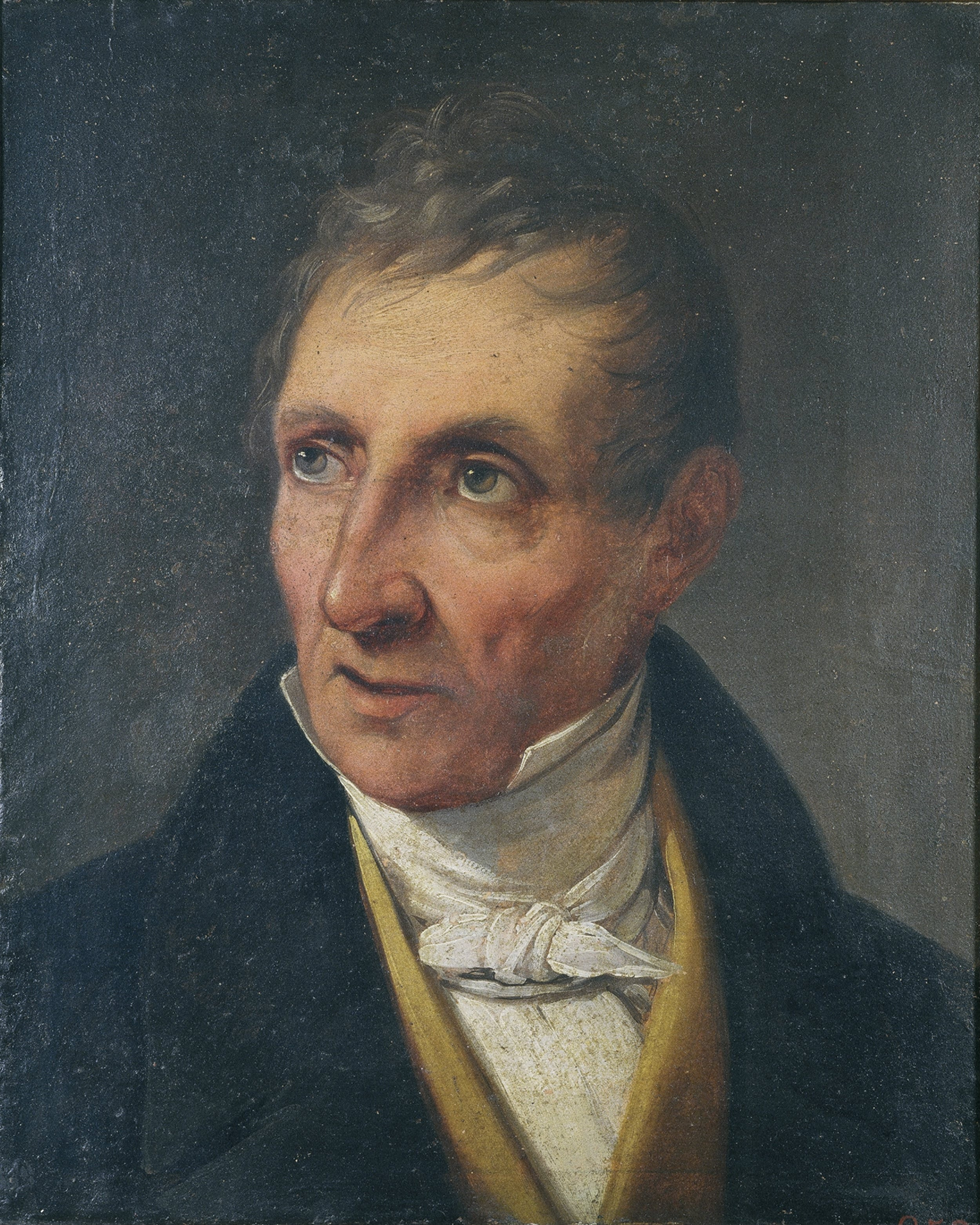
Posthumous portrait of Francesco Alberi, by his son, Clemente

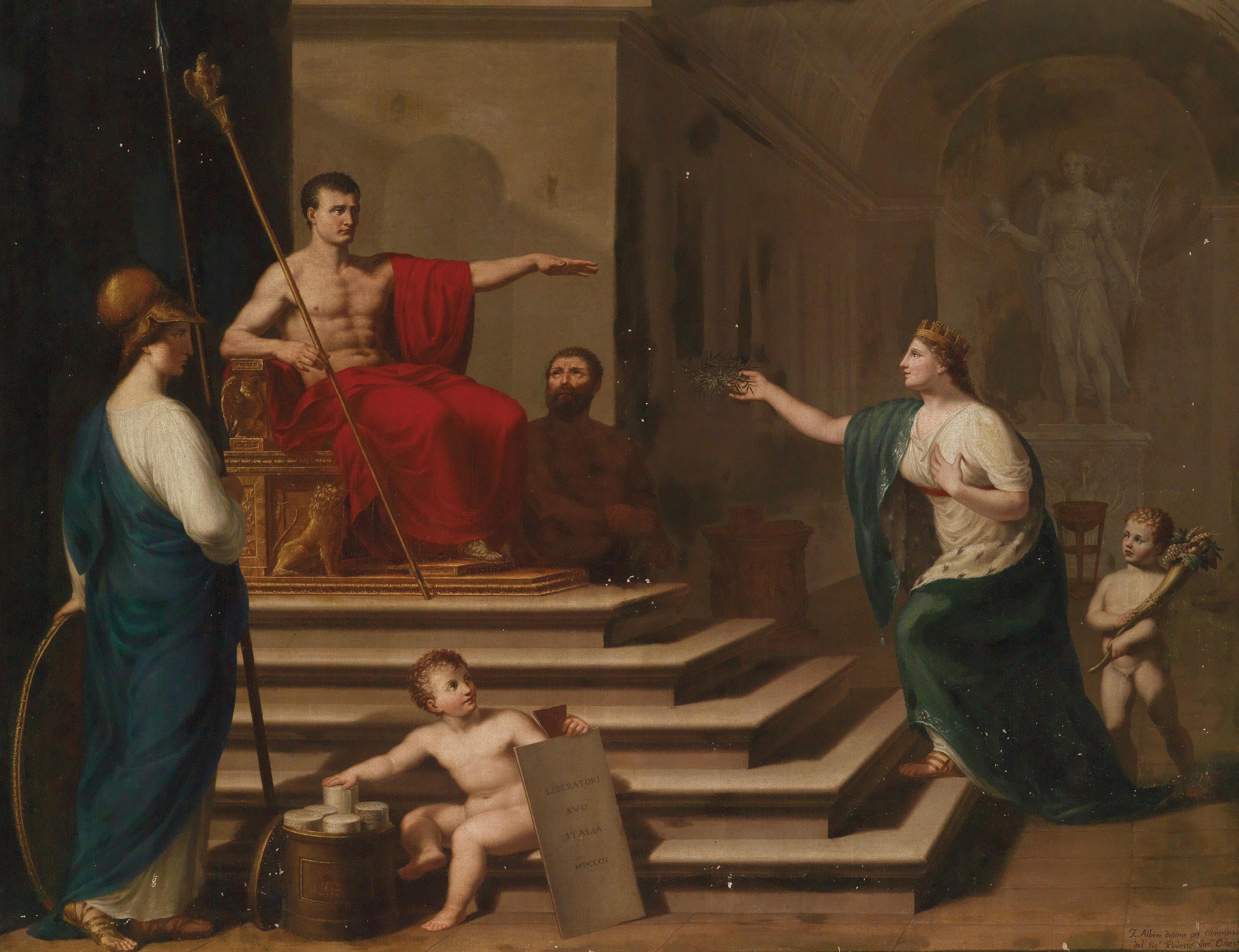
Allegory of Napoleon as Liberator of Italy (c. 1800)

Francesco Alberi (3 March 1765 – 24 January 1836) was an Italian Neoclassical style painter, active in Bologna, Padua, Rimini and Rome.

== Biography ==
He was born in Rimini, and initially apprenticed there with Giuseppe Soleri, but by the age of twenty he became a pupil of Domenico Corvi in Rome. After five years with Corvi, he returned to Rimini where he painted in oil, tempera and fresco for many of the prominent families such as the Battaglini, Garampi, Ganganelli, and Spina.

In 1799, he was elected professor of design at the Lyceum of Rimini. Between 1803 and 1806, he was professor of painting at the Academy of Fine Arts in Bologna, after which he moved to Padua. In 1810, he returned to Bologna as professor.

His paintings generally depicted Greco-Roman classic themes or historic subjects. Among his major works were hagiographic paintings such as those with Napoleon as the subject, as well as the Death of Dido, the Death of Cato, and the Recognition of Achilles. He died in Bologna.

He wrote a few treatises including Teorie dell'arte pittorica and a Riposta a sei lettere anonime. The latter was a response to criticisms of the academy and his paintings. In addition he wrote extensive assessments of the art of his day.

== Sources ==
- Boni, Filippo de' (1852). Biografia degli artisti ovvero dizionario della vita e delle opere dei pittori, degli scultori, degli intagliatori, dei tipografi e dei musici di ogni nazione che fiorirono da'tempi più remoti sino á nostri giorni. Seconda Edizione.. Venice; Googlebooks: Presso Andrea Santini e Figlio. pp. 10–11.
- Treccani Encyclopedia entry
- Ceiling frescoes for Palazzo Albicini (Apotheosis of Albicini Family)
