= Fortuné =

Fortuné can be a masculine given name, a middle name, or a surname. Notable people with the name include:

== Given name ==
- Fortuné du Boisgobey, French novelist
- Fortuné Méaulle
- Fortuné Oré, Beninese footballer

== Middle name ==
- Joseph Fortuné Théodore Eydoux (1802–1841), French naturalist

== Surname ==
- Gérard Fortuné (died 2019), Haitian visual artist
- Kévin Fortuné (born 1989), Footballer
- Marc-Antoine Fortuné (born 1981), French football manager
- Yassin Fortuné (born 1999), Haitian footballer

== See also ==
- Antoine-Fortuné Marion, French naturalist
- Danielle Boodoo-Fortuné, poet and artist based in Trinidad and Tobago
- Fortunée, French literary fairy tale
- Fortunée Briquet, French femme des lettres
- French destroyer Le Fortuné
- Port Fortuné, former name of Chatham, Massachusetts, U.S.
- Fortune (name)
- Fortune (disambiguation)
