= Fortune =

Fortune may refer to:

== General ==
- Fortuna or Fortune, the Roman goddess of luck
- Luck
- Wealth
- Fate
- Fortune, a prediction made in fortune-telling
- Fortune, in a fortune cookie

== Arts and entertainment ==
=== Film and television ===
- The Fortune (1931 film), a French film
- The Fortune, a 1975 American film
- Fortune (film), a 2022 Tajik film
- The Fortune, a 2026 UK TV series on 5
- Fortune TV, Burma
- Fortune: Million Pound Giveaway, a 2007 UK TV programme
- "Fortune" (Smallville), a US TV episode

=== Music ===
- Fortune Records, 1946–1995
- Fortune (band), 1980s, US
- The Fortunes, an English harmony beat group
- Fortune (Beni album), 2011
- Fortune (Callers album) and its title song, 2008
- Fortune (Chris Brown album), 2012
- "Fortune" (song), by Nami Tamaki, 2005
- "Fortune", a song by Emma Pollock from Watch the Fireworks, 2007
- "Fortune", a song by Great Big Sea from Sea of No Cares, 2002

=== Sports and games ===
- Fortune (Metal Gear), a video game character
- Fortune (professional wrestling)

=== Theatres ===
- Fortune Playhouse, a theatre in London, England
- Fortune Theatre, London, England
- Fortune Theatre, Dunedin
- New Fortune Theatre, University of Western Australia, Perth

== Businesses ==
- Fortune Brands, a former US company
  - Fortune Brands Home & Security, a successor company
- Fortune Systems, a defunct US computer company
- Fortune Tobacco, a Philippine company now part of PMFTC

== People ==
- Fortune (name), a surname and given name
- Fortune (American slave) (c. 1743–1798), African-American slave

== Periodicals ==
- Fortune (magazine), US
- Addis Fortune or Fortune, a newspaper in Addis Ababa, Ethiopia

== Places ==
- Fortune, Newfoundland and Labrador, Canada
- Fortune Bay, Newfoundland, Canada
- Fortune (constituency), in Sham Shui Po District, Hong Kong
- Fortune, a barangay in Marikina, Philippines
- Fortunen, Denmark
- Fortune Island (disambiguation)

== Ships ==
- Fortune (Plymouth Colony ship)
- Fortune (1800 ship), French vessel
- Fortune (1805 ship), Spanish and British vessel
- HMS Fortune, ships of the Royal Navy, including:
  - HMS Fortune (1778), a 14-gun sloop
  - HMS Fortune (1913), an Acasta-class destroyer
  - HMS Fortune (H70), an F-class destroyer
- HMCS Fortune (MCB 151), a Canadian minesweeper
- SS Fortune, a cargo ship
- USS Fortune (1865), a tugboat
- USS Fortune (IX-146), a cargo ship
- MSC Fortunate, a cargo ship also known as MV Fortune and MV Hyundai Fortune

== Other uses ==
- fortune, a Unix program
- Fortune, a typeface designed by Walter Baum

== See also ==
- Fortuna (disambiguation)
- Fortunate (disambiguation)
- Misfortune (disambiguation)
