= Édouard Riou =

French painter (1833–1900)

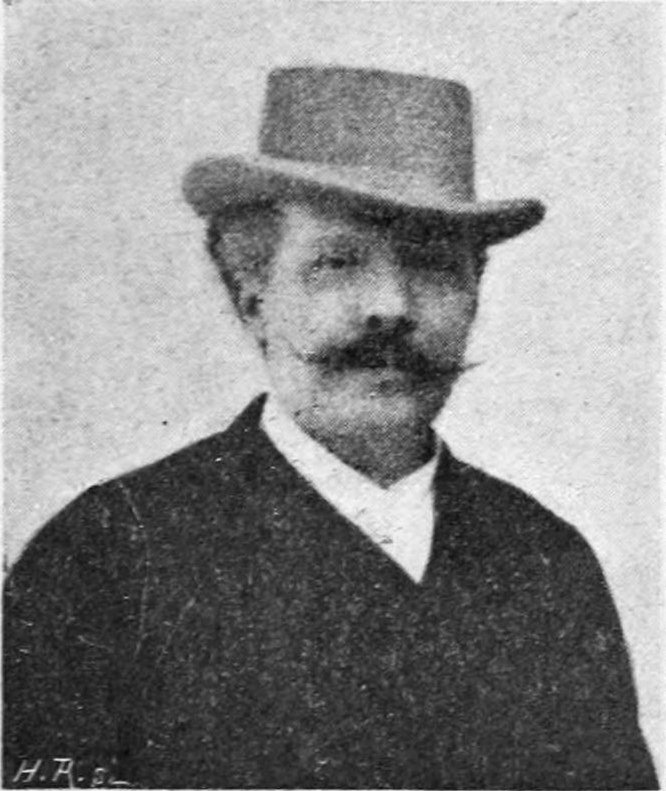
- Born: December 2, 1833; Saint-Servan, Ille-et-Vilaine, France
- Died: January 27, 1900 (aged 66); Paris, France
- Occupations: Painter, illustrator
- Notable work: Works by Jules Verne

Signature
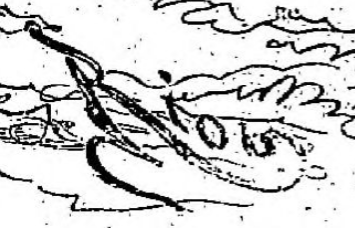

Édouard Riou (French: [edwaʁ ʁju]; 2 December 1833 – 27 January 1900) was a French illustrator who illustrated six novels by Jules Verne, as well as several other well-known works.

== Life ==
Riou was born in 1833 in Saint-Servan, Ille-et-Vilaine, and studied under Charles-François Daubigny and Gustave Doré, graduating in 1859. Apart from supplying designs for wood-engravings, his artistic specialties included landscape painting and commemorative art (including works for the opening of the Suez Canal and the marriage of a daughter of the Czar).

His collaboration with Jules Verne started in 1865 with the publication of Verne's novel Five Weeks in a Balloon, and continued for a run of six novels in all:

- Five Weeks in a Balloon (1865): 51 illustrations by Riou (40) and Henri de Montaut (5), unsigned (6), wood-engravings by Coste, Delaville, Dumont, Fournier, Hildibrand, Pannemaker, Prunaire
- The Adventures of Captain Hatteras (1866): 259 illustrations by Riou (190) and Henri de Montaut (69), wood-engravings by Barbant, Cazat, Delaville, Dumont, Hildibrand, Joliet, Linton, Pannemaker, Pierdon, Pisan, Prunaire
- Journey to the Center of the Earth (1867): 56 illustrations, wood-engravings by Pannemaker, Gauchard, Charles Maurand
- The Children of Captain Grant (1868): 175 illustrations, wood-engravings by Delaville, Gauchard, Maurand, Pannemaker, Prunaire
- Twenty Thousand Leagues Under the Seas (1871): 111 illustrations by Riou (24, the first eleven chapters) and Alphonse de Neuville (86), wood-engravings by Hildibrand
- The Survivors of the Chancellor (1875): 45 illustrations by Riou (45) and Jules Férat (13), wood-engravings by Charles Barbant, Crosbie, Dumont, Hildibrand, Louis, Méaulle, Pannemaker

Regarding Riou's work for Twenty Thousand Leagues Under the Seas, Verne wrote in 1868: "I have received the drawings from Riou. I have several suggestions to make which I'll mention to him by return mail. I think he needs to make the people much smaller and the rooms much larger. And he needs to add much more detail... By the way, it was an excellent idea to use Colonel Charras as the model for Captain Nemo. I should've thought of that."

The illustrator and Verne scholar Ron Miller has said: "I believe his work stylistically spans the transition between the illustrators of the early 19th century and those of the latter half—when the profession of professional illustrators became established. Some of the qualities that Riou carried over were the often cartoon-like depiction of characters and the use of numerous 'spot' illustrations."

Edmondo Marcucci wrote: "Riou's drawings are rich with light, and the traits of his characters have a vigorous expression. Riou succeeds in adapting himself artistically to the realistic reproduction of the many fantastic locales of the Vernian fictional geography: the mists and the glacial icepacks, the shadows inside the Earth's crust, the deserted and expansive beaches, and the many bodies of water and their movement... Everything is both ordered and evocative in Riou's work—his style might be called 'romantic realism.'"

Riou also illustrated Walter Scott's Ivanhoe (1880) and Waverley, Victor Hugo's Notre Dame de Paris, Louis Figuier's La terre avant le deluge (1863), Alexandre Dumas' The Count of Monte Cristo (1887). He became a member of the Legion of Honour.

Riou died in Paris on January 27, 1900.

== Gallery ==
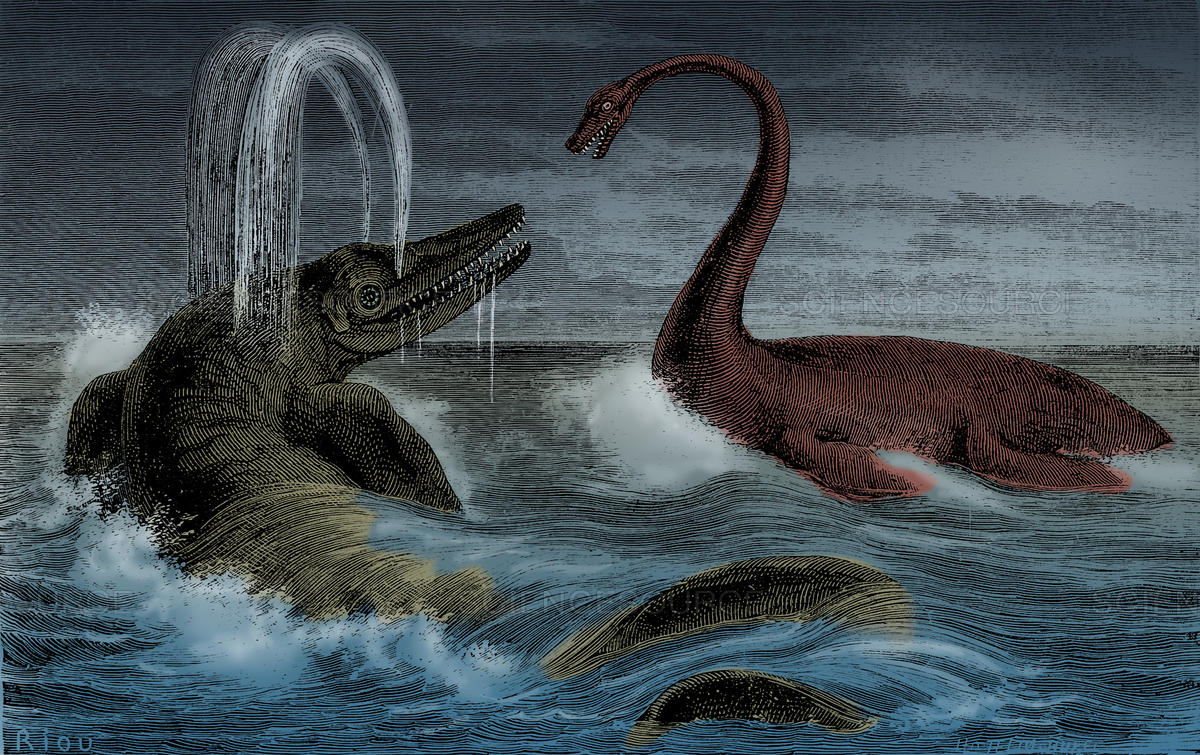
Ichthyosaur and Plesiosaur, 1863

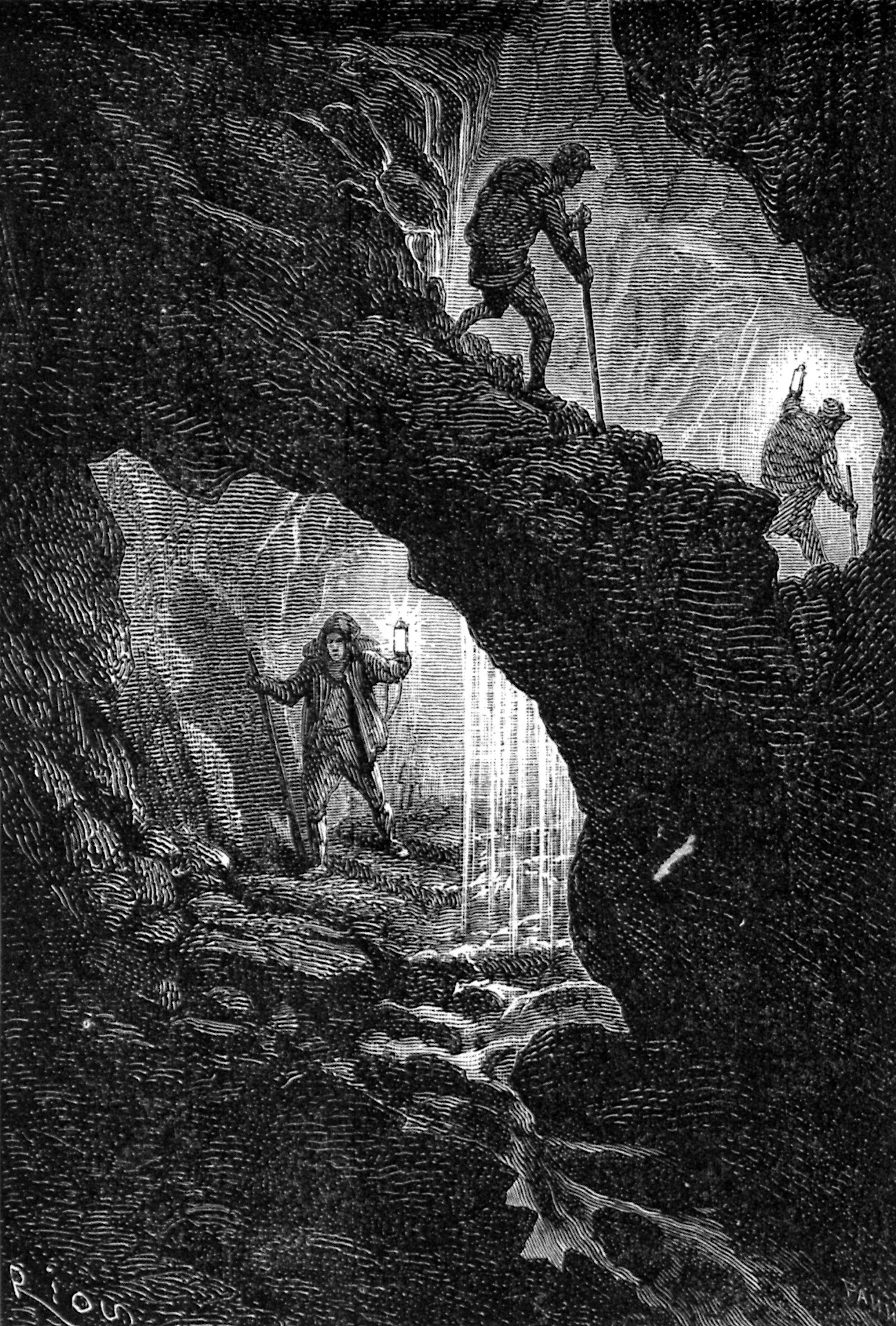
Journey to the Center of the Earth, 1867

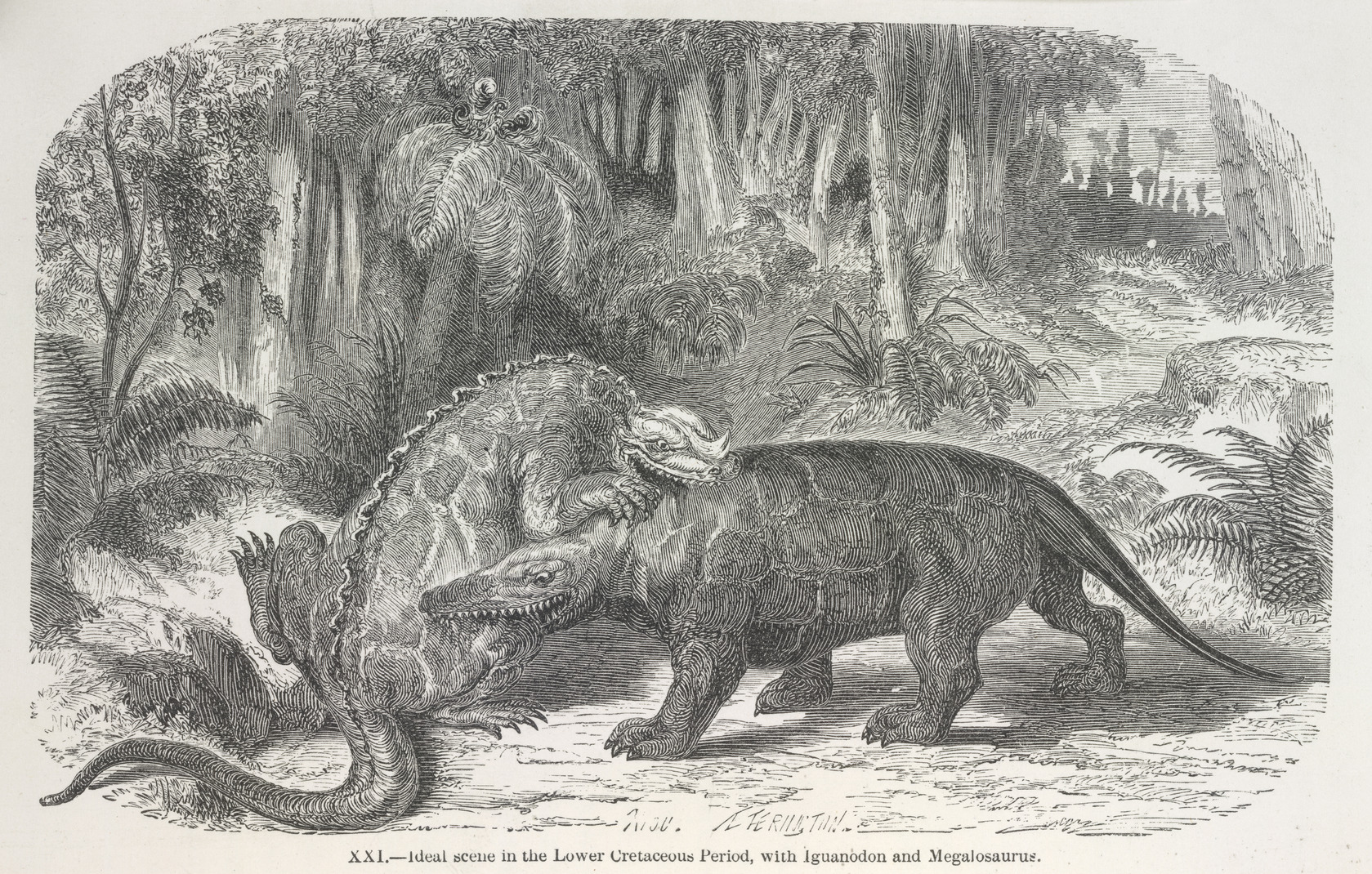
Riou's depiction for La terre avant le deluge of Iguanodon battling Megalosaurus

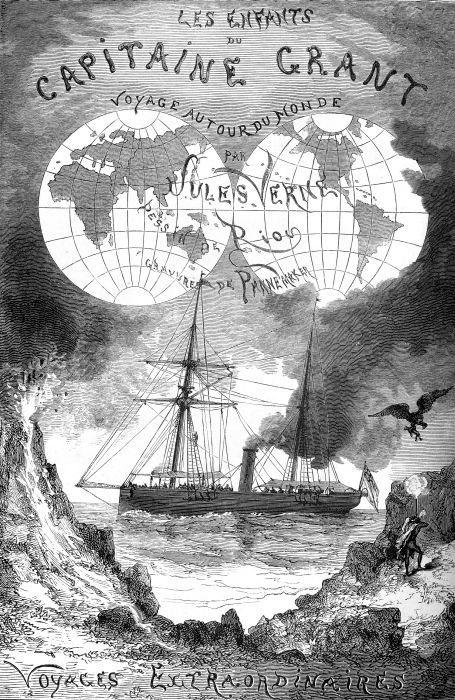
Riou's frontispiece for Les Enfants du capitaine Grant (1868)

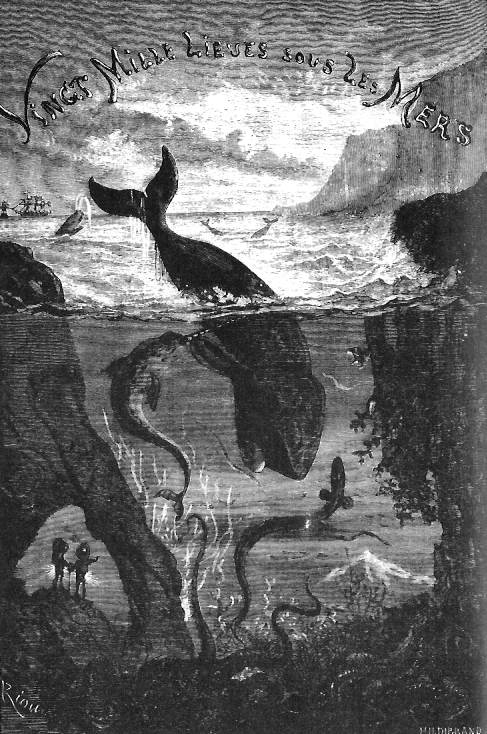
Vingt Mille Lieues sous les mers (1871)

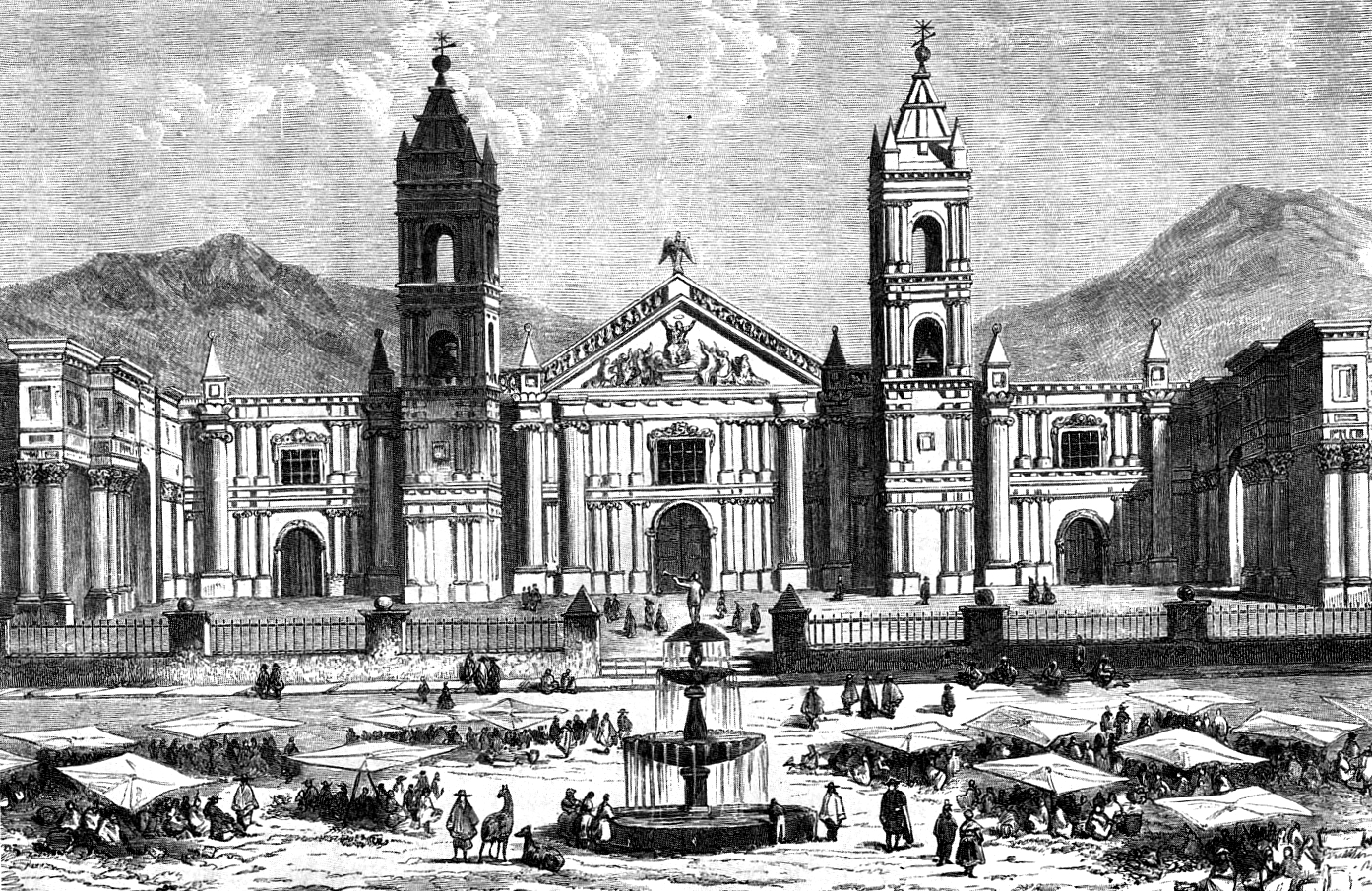
Basilica Cathedral of Arequipa, c. 1873

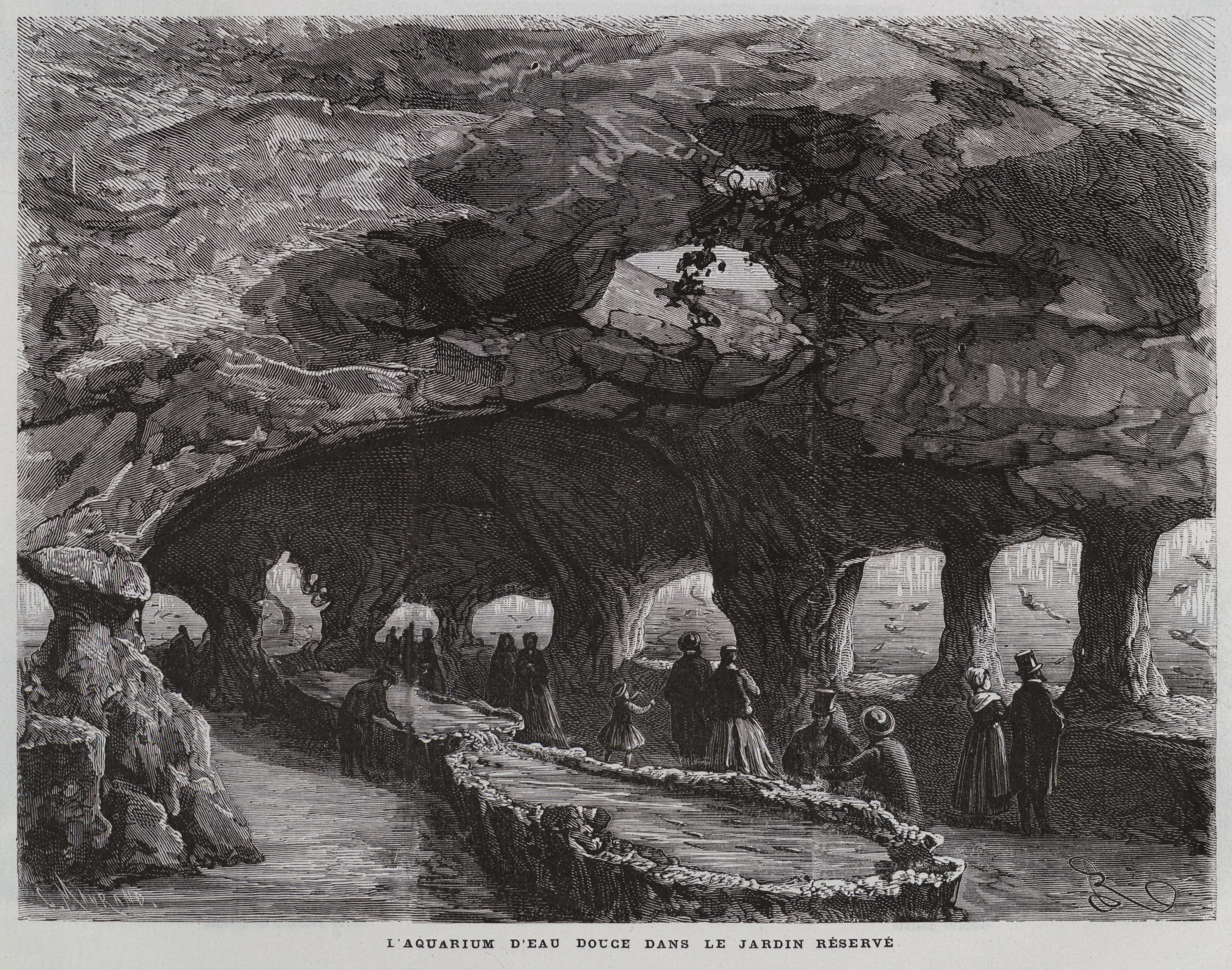
Freshwater aquarium in the Champ-de-Mars garden, during the 1867 Paris World Fair, c. 1868

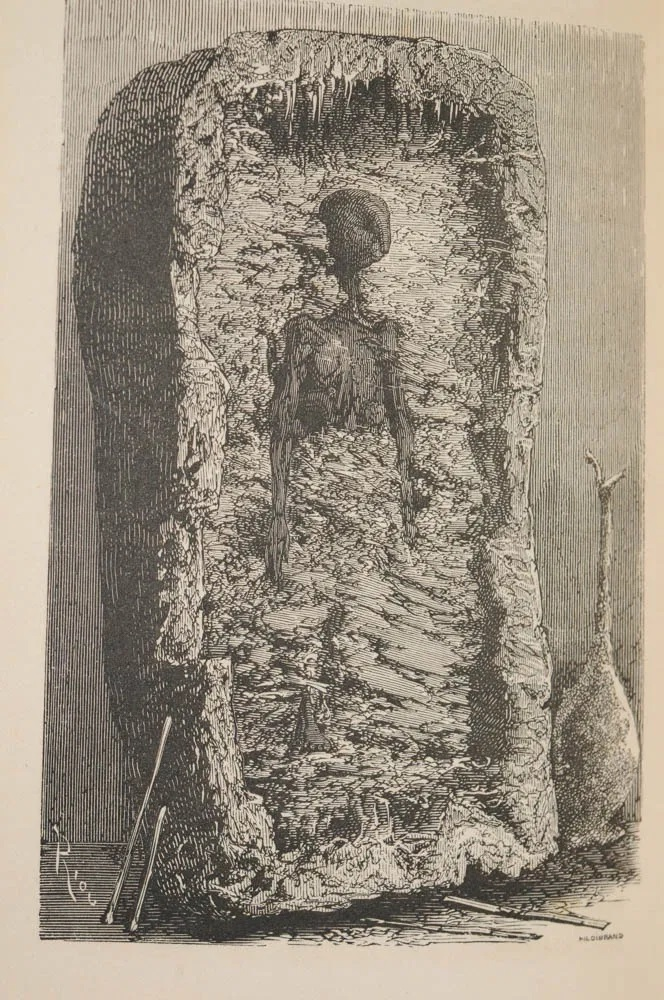
Illustration of a Martian mummy from Un habitant de la planète Mars by Henri de Parville, 1865

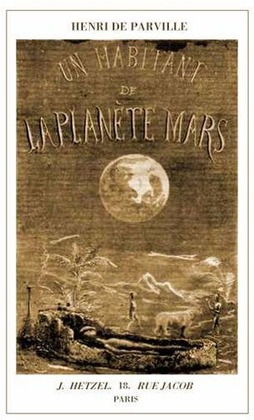
Cover of Un habitant de la planète Mars by Henri de Parville, 1865

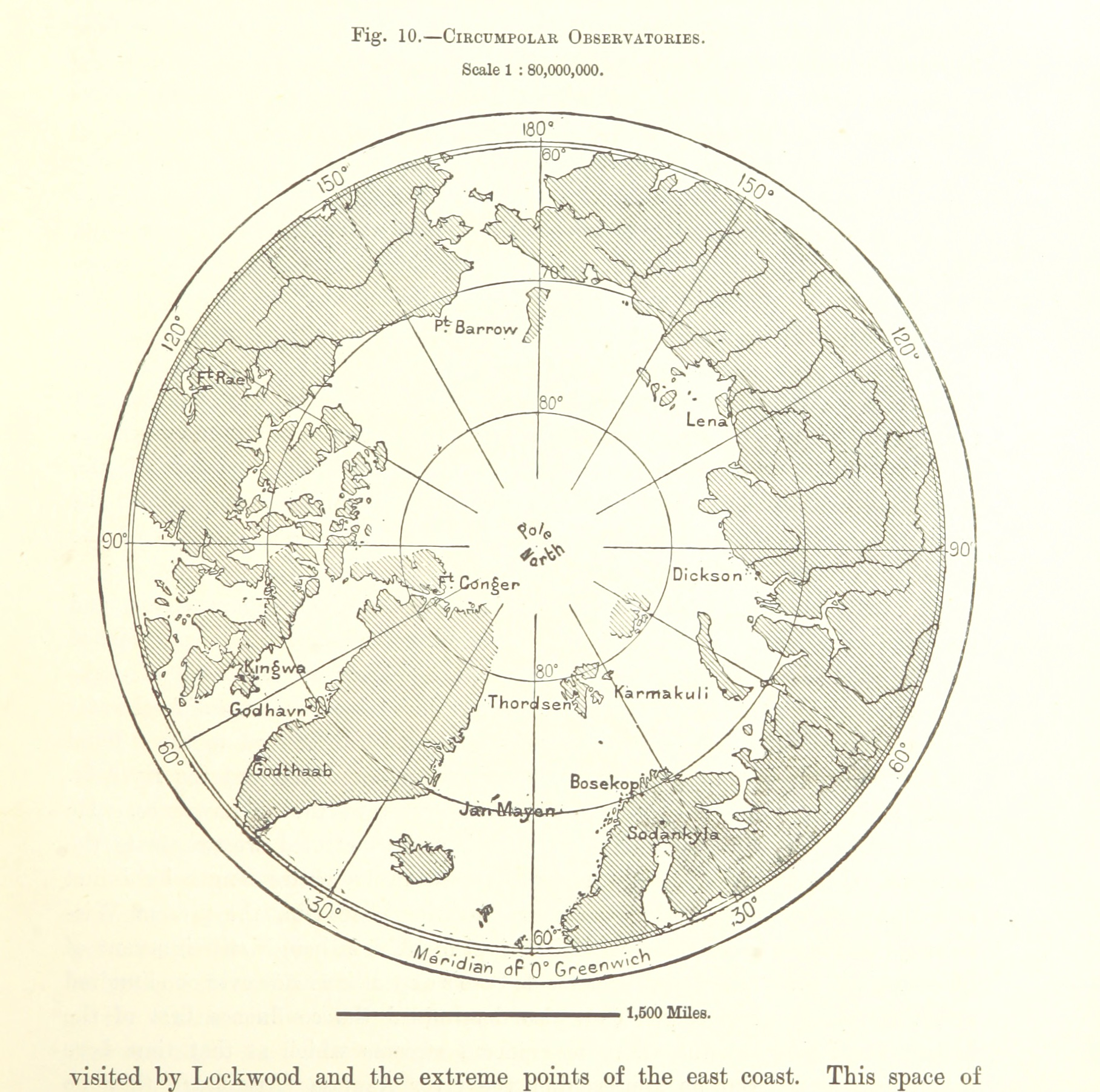
Map of the North Pole from The Earth and its Inhabitants, 1878

== See also ==
- Jules Férat (1819–1889)
- Léon Benett (1839–1917)
- Georges Roux (1850–1929)
- Émile-Antoine Bayard (1837–1891)
- Alphonse de Neuville (1835–1885)
- Paul-Dominique Philippoteaux (1846-1923)
