= The Adventures of Captain Hatteras =

1866 novel by Jules Verne

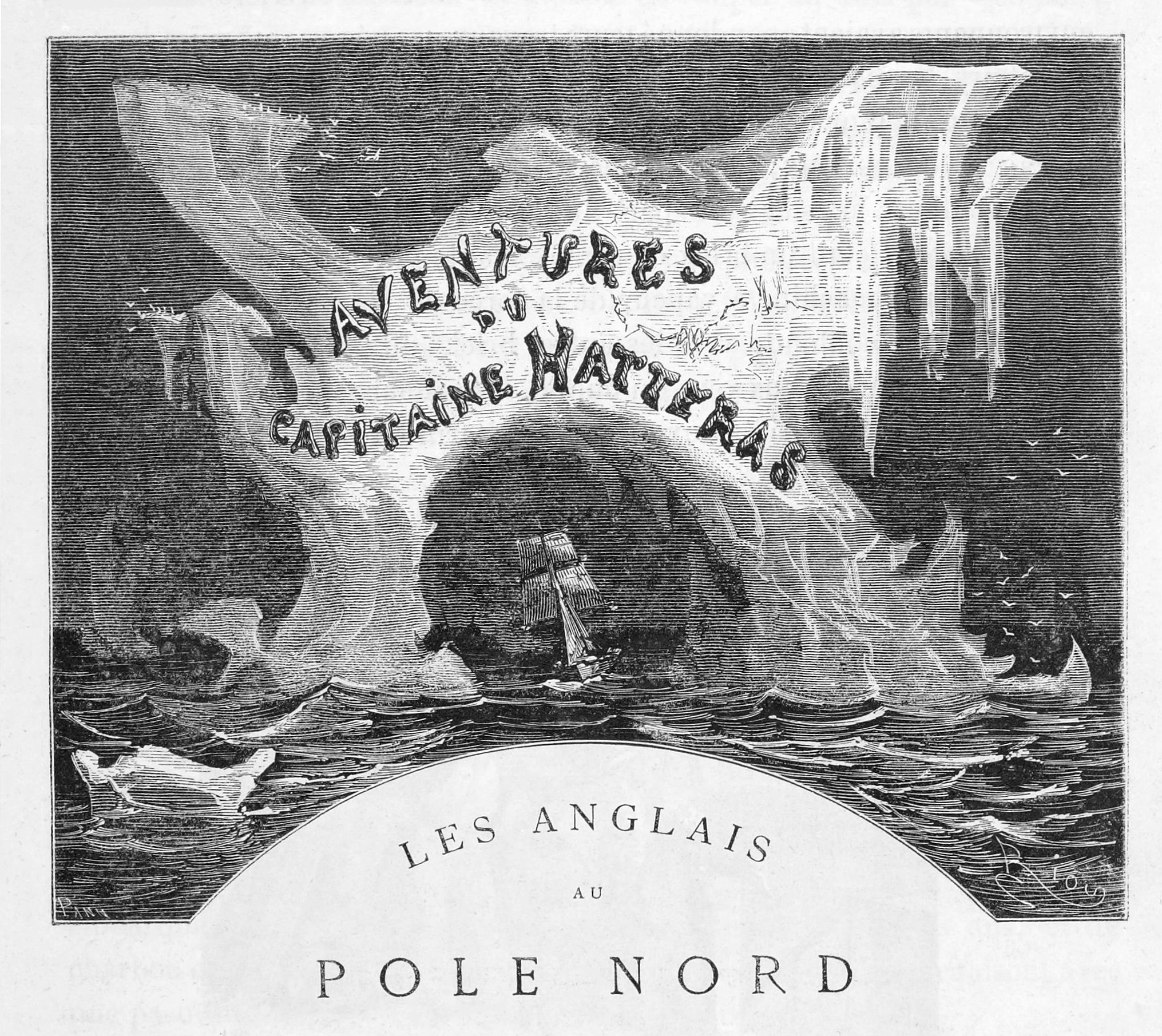
- Title page of the first edition
- Author: Jules Verne
- Original title: Voyages et aventures du capitaine Hatteras
- Illustrator: Édouard Riou and Henri de Montaut
- Language: French
- Series: The Extraordinary Voyages #2
- Genre: Adventure novel, science fiction
- Publisher: Pierre-Jules Hetzel
- Publication date: 1866 (1864-1865 as a serial)
- Publication place: France
- English publication date: 1874
- Media type: Print (Hardback)
- Preceded by: Five Weeks in a Balloon
- Followed by: Journey to the Centre of the Earth
- Text: The Adventures of Captain Hatteras at Wikisource

The Adventures of Captain Hatteras (French: Voyages et Aventures du capitaine Hatteras) is an 1866 adventure novel by Jules Verne in two parts: The English at the North Pole (French: Les Anglais au pôle Nord) and The Desert of Ice (French: Le Désert de glace).

The novel was published for the first time in 1864 as a serial in the French magazine named Magasin d'éducation et de récréation. The definitive version from 1866 was included in the Voyages extraordinaires series ("The Extraordinary Voyages"). Although it was the first book of the series, it was labelled as number two. Three of Verne's books from 1863 to 1865 (Five Weeks in a Balloon, Journey to the Centre of the Earth, and From the Earth to the Moon) were added into the series retroactively. The character of Captain Hatteras shows many similarities with the English naval explorer Sir John Franklin.

== Synopsis ==
The novel, set in 1861, described adventures of a British expedition led by Captain John Hatteras to the North Pole. Hatteras is convinced that the sea around the pole is not frozen and his obsession is to reach the North Pole no matter what. Mutiny by the crew results in destruction of their ship but Hatteras, with a few men, continues on the expedition. On the shore of the island of "New America (Actually New Foundland)" he discovers the remains of a ship used by a previous expedition from the United States. Doctor Clawbonny recalls in mind the plan of the real ice palace, constructed completely from ice in Russia in 1740 to build a snow-house, where they should spend a winter. The travellers winter on the island and survive mainly due to the ingenuity of Doctor Clawbonny (who is able to make fire with an ice lens, make bullets from frozen mercury and repel attacks by polar bears with remotely controlled explosions of black powder).

When the winter ends the sea becomes ice-free. The travellers build a boat from the shipwreck and head towards the pole. Here they discover an island, an active volcano, and name it after Hatteras. With difficulty a fjord is found and the group get ashore. After three hours climbing they reach the mouth of the volcano. The exact location of the pole is in the crater and Hatteras falls into it. As the sequence was originally written, Hatteras perishes in the crater; Verne's editor, Jules Hetzel, suggested or rather required that Verne do a rewrite so that Hatteras survives but is driven insane by the intensity of the experience, and after return to England he is put into an asylum for the insane. Losing his "soul" in the crater of the North Pole, Hatteras never speaks another word. He spends the remainder of his days walking the streets surrounding the asylum with his faithful dog Duke. While mute and deaf to the world, Hatteras' walks are not without a direction. As indicated by the last line "Captain Hatteras forever marches northward".

== New America ==
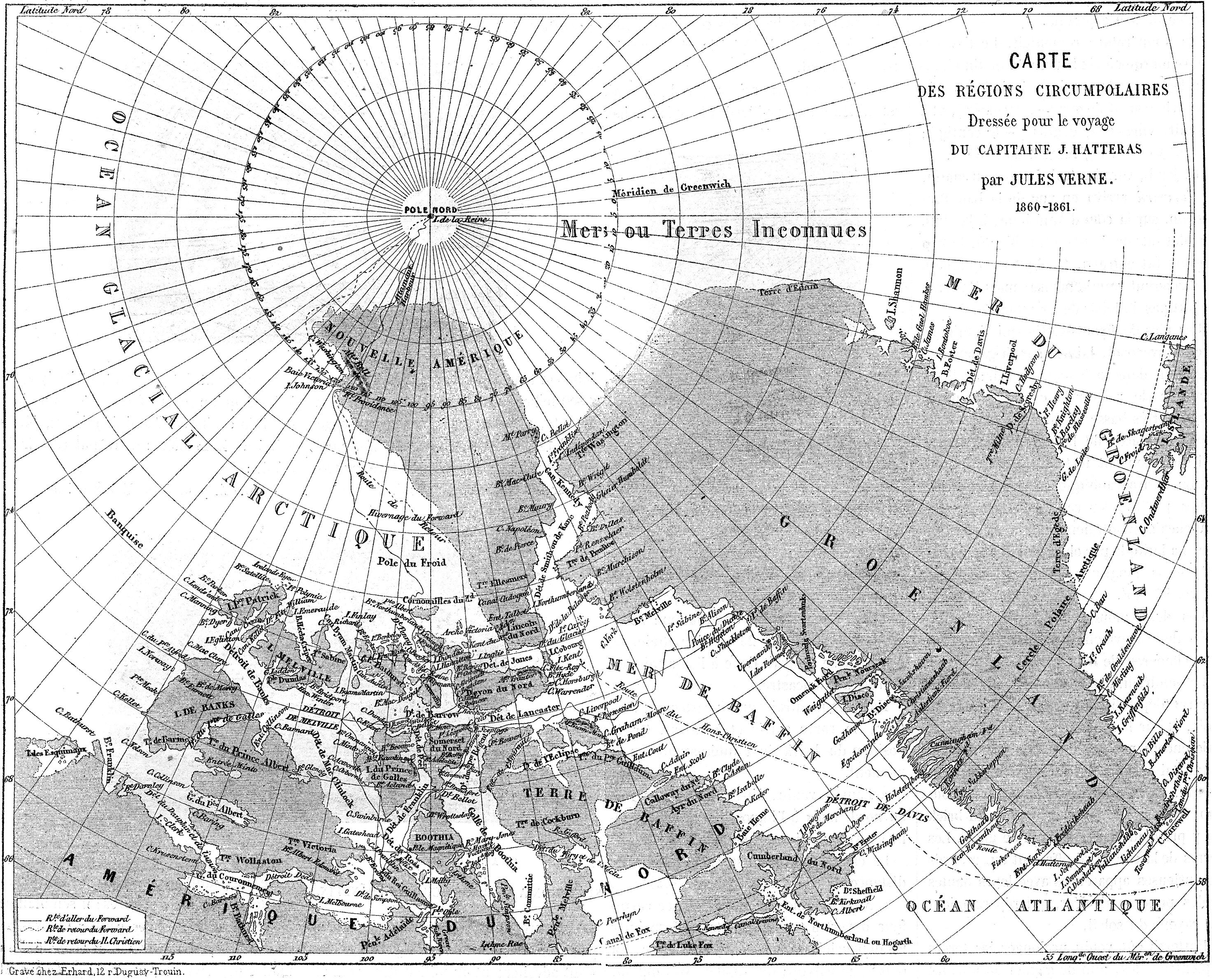
New America (Nouvelle-Amerique) in map of Captain Hatteras' voyage

New America is the name given to a large Arctic island, a northward extension of Ellesmere Island, as discovered by Captain John Hatteras and his crew. Its features include, on the west coast, Victoria Bay, Cape Washington, Johnson Island, Bell Mountain, and Fort Providence, and at its northern point (87°5′N 118°35′W), Altamont Harbour.

As with many of Verne's imaginative creations, his description of Arctic geography was based on scientific knowledge at the time the novel was written (1866) but foreshadowed future discoveries. Ellesmere Island had been re-discovered and named by Edward Inglefield in 1852 and further explored by Isaac Israel Hayes in 1860–61. Forty years after the novel's publication, in 1906, Robert Peary claimed to have sighted Crocker Land around 83° N, and in 1909, Frederick Cook sighted Bradley Land at 85° N, both at locations occupied by Verne's New America. Cook's choice of route may actually have been inspired by his reading of Verne.

The land is named by Captain Altamont, an American explorer, who is first to set foot on the land. In the novel as published, it is unclear whether New America is meant to be a territorial claim for the United States. As William Butcher points out, this would not be surprising, since Verne wrote about the US acquisition of Alaska in The Fur Country, and Lincoln Island is proposed as a US possession in The Mysterious Island. In fact, a deleted chapter, "John Bull and Jonathan", had Hatteras and Altamont dueling for the privilege of claiming the land for their respective countries.

== Adaptation ==
In 1912, Georges Méliès made a film based on the story entitled The Conquest of the Pole (French: Conquête du pôle).

== English translations ==
A number of English-language translations of The Adventures of Captain Hatteras were published in the nineteenth century. These are generally considered to be out-of-copyright, and copies can be obtained from free sources:

- London: George Routledge and Sons. (1874)
- London, New York: Ward, Lock. (1876)
- Boston: James R. Osgood Company. (1876)
- London: Goubaud & Son (1877).

These translations compress and truncate Verne's text to varying degrees; the Osgood translation is considered to be of “relatively good quality.” Editions from other publishers are generally based on one of these four translations.

A modern translation by William Butcher was published by Oxford University Press in 2005.
