= Five Weeks in a Balloon =

1863 novel by Jules Verne

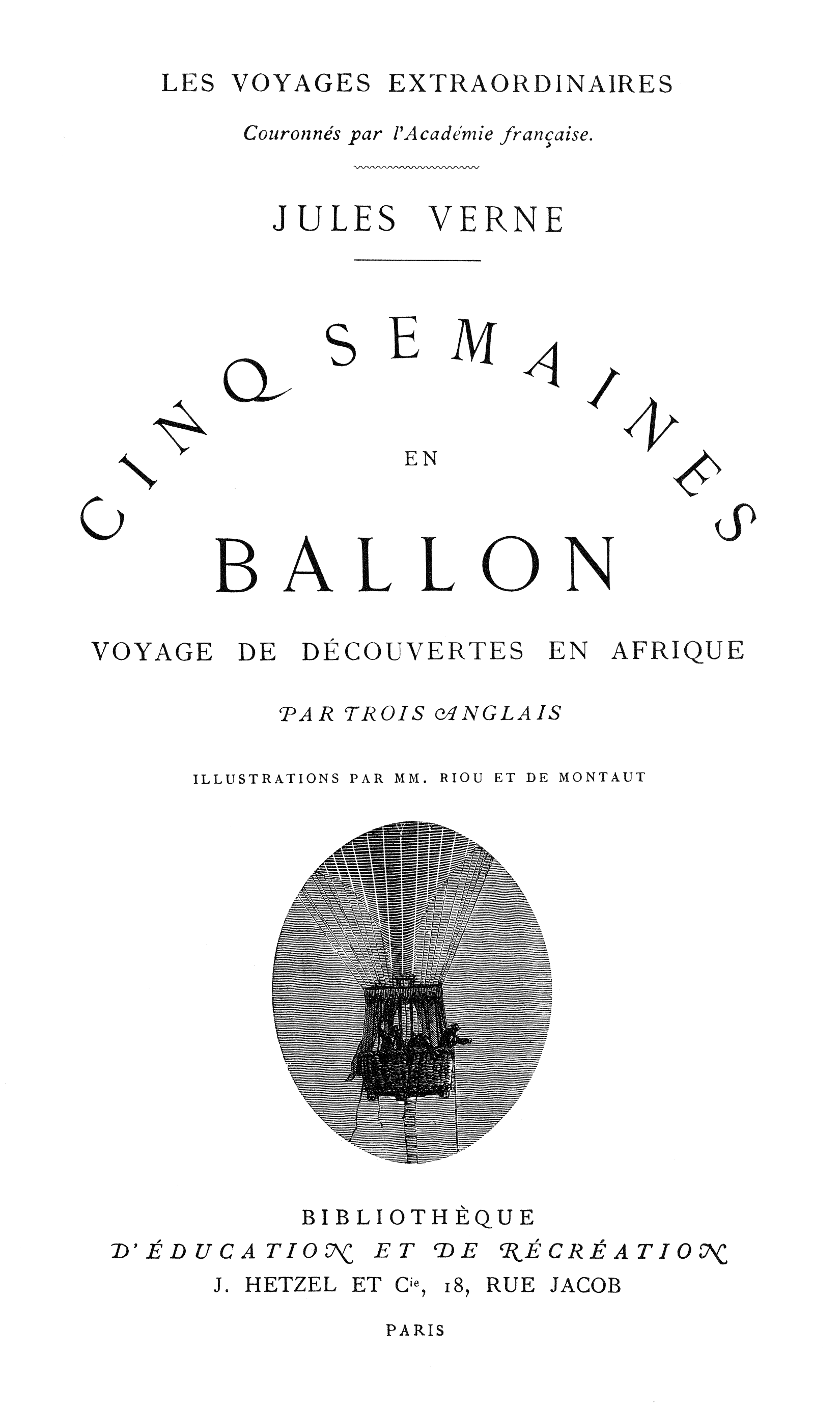
- Title page of a Hetzel edition
- Author: Jules Verne
- Original title: Cinq semaines en ballon
- Translator: Various
- Illustrator: Édouard Riou and Henri de Montaut
- Language: French
- Series: The Extraordinary Voyages #1
- Genre: Adventure novel, science fiction
- Publisher: Pierre-Jules Hetzel
- Publication date: 1863
- Publication place: France
- Media type: Print (Hardback)
- Pages: 396
- Followed by: The Adventures of Captain Hatteras
- Text: Five Weeks in a Balloon at Wikisource

Five Weeks in a Balloon, or, A Journey of Discovery by Three Englishmen in Africa (French: Cinq semaines en ballon) is an adventure novel by Jules Verne, published in 1863. It is the first novel in which he perfected the "ingredients" of his later work, skillfully mixing a story line full of adventure and plot twists that keep the reader's interest through passages of technical, geographic, and historic description. The book gives readers a glimpse of the exploration of Africa, which was still not completely known to Europeans of the time, with explorers traveling all over the continent in search of its secrets. The unabridged English translation of the novel was done by Frederick Paul Walter and edited by Arthur B. Evans in 2015.

Public interest in fanciful tales of African exploration was at its height, and the novel was an instant hit; it made Verne financially independent and led to long-term contracts with Pierre-Jules Hetzel's publishing house, which put out some sixty more books of his over the next four decades.

== Plot summary ==
A scholar and explorer, Dr. Samuel Fergusson, accompanied by his manservant Joe and his friend, professional hunter Richard "Dick" Kennedy, sets out to travel across the African continent — still not fully explored — with the help of a balloon filled with hydrogen. He has invented a mechanism that, by eliminating the need to release gas or throw ballast overboard to control his altitude, allows very long trips to be taken. This voyage is meant to link together the voyages of Sir Richard Burton and John Hanning Speke in East Africa with those of Heinrich Barth in the regions of the Sahara and Chad. The trip begins in Zanzibar on the east coast, and passes across Lake Victoria, Lake Chad, Agadez, Timbuktu, Djenné and Ségou to St Louis in modern-day Senegal on the west coast. The book describes the unknown interior of Africa near modern-day Central African Republic as a desert, when it is actually savanna.

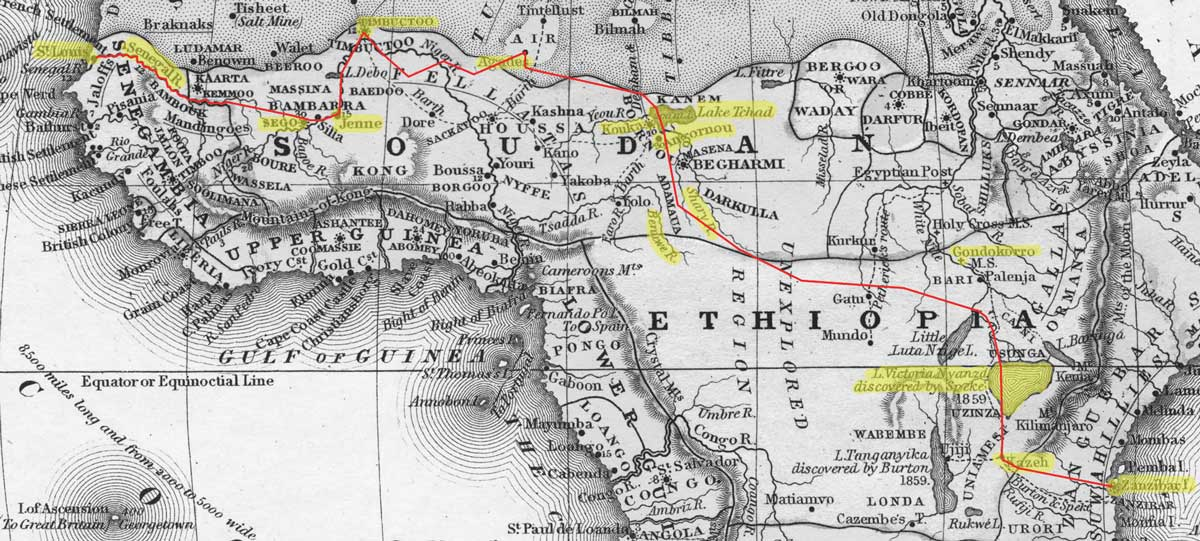
Map of the trip described in the book from the east to the west coast of Africa.

A good deal of the initial exploration is focused on finding the source of the Nile, an event that occurs in chapter 18 (out of 43). The second leg is to link up the other explorers. There are numerous scenes of adventure, composed of either a conflict with natives or conflict with the environment. Some examples include:

- Rescuing a missionary from a tribe that was preparing to sacrifice him.
- Running out of water while stranded without wind over the Sahara.
- An attack on the balloon by bearded vultures, leading to dramatic developments as Joe leaps out of the balloon.
- The actions taken to rescue Joe later.
- Narrowly escaping the remnants of a militant army as the balloon dwindles to nothingness with the loss of hydrogen.
- The shooting of a bluebuck, now known to be anachronistic since the species was already extinct. (Note: "'A splendid shot!' exclaimed the hunter. 'It's a very rare species of the antelope, and I hope to be able to prepare his skin in such a way as to keep it.'")

In all these adventures, the protagonists overcome the challenges they face through continued perseverance more than anything else. The novel is filled with coincidental moments where trouble is avoided because wind catches up at just the right time, or the characters look in just the right direction.

The balloon itself ultimately gives out before the end, but makes it far enough across to get the protagonists to friendly lands, and eventually back to England, therefore succeeding in the expedition. The story abruptly ends after the African trip, with only a brief synopsis of what follows.

== Film adaptations ==
- 1961 - Flight of the Lost Balloon United States, directed by Nathan Juran and starring Marshall Thompson. Due to pressure from Irwin Allen and 20th Century Fox all references to Jules Verne were dropped from the film.
- 1962 - Five Weeks in a Balloon, US, directed by Irwin Allen and starring Red Buttons, Fabian, Barbara Eden, Sir Cedric Hardwicke, Peter Lorre, Richard Haydn, Barbara Luna
- 1975 - Viaje Fantástico en Globo, Mexico, directed by René Cardona Jr. and starring Hugo Stiglitz
- 1977 - Five Weeks In A Balloon, Hanna-Barbera animated film directed by Chris Cuddington
