= Charles Barbant =

French wood engraver and illustrator (1844–1921)

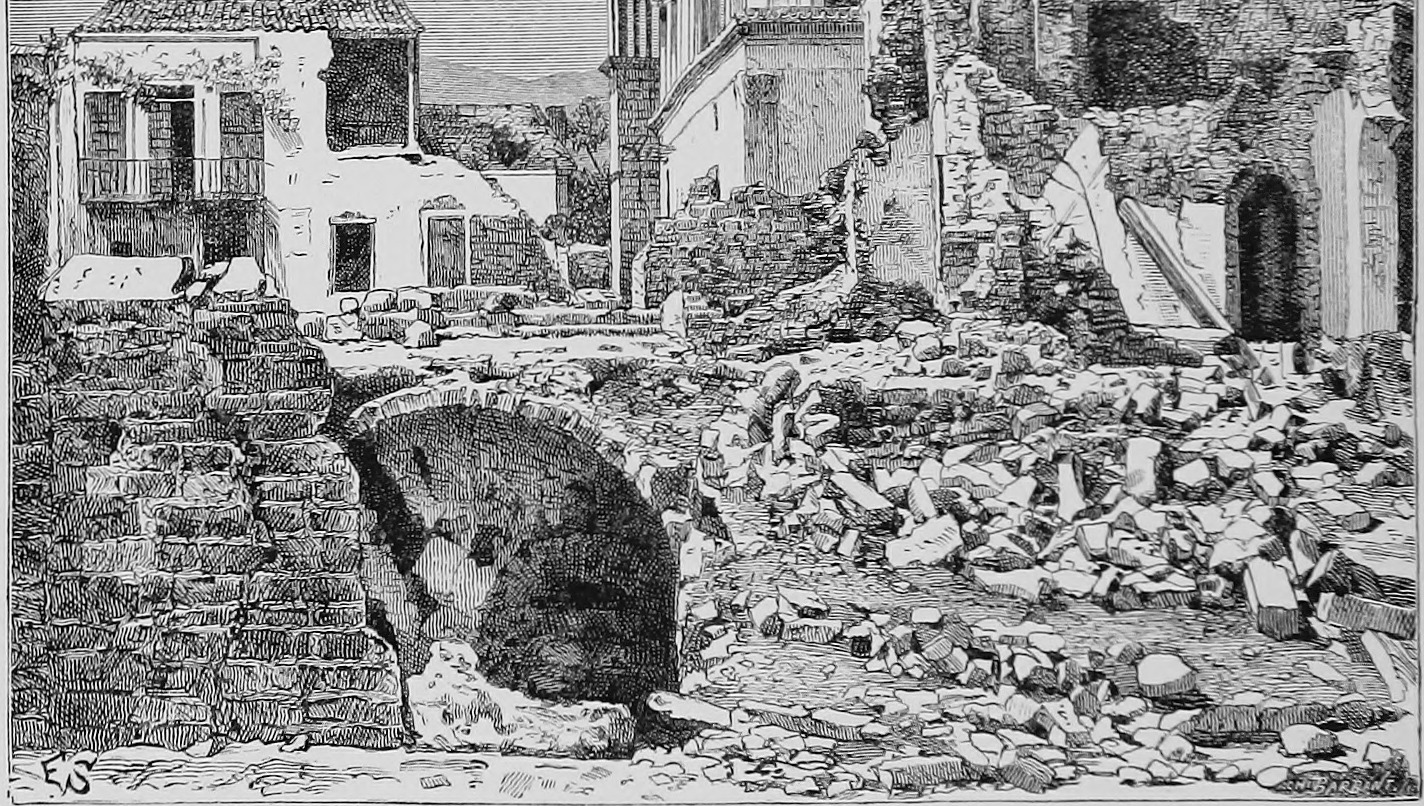
The 1881 Chios earthquake; from The Universal Geography by Élisée Reclus et al.

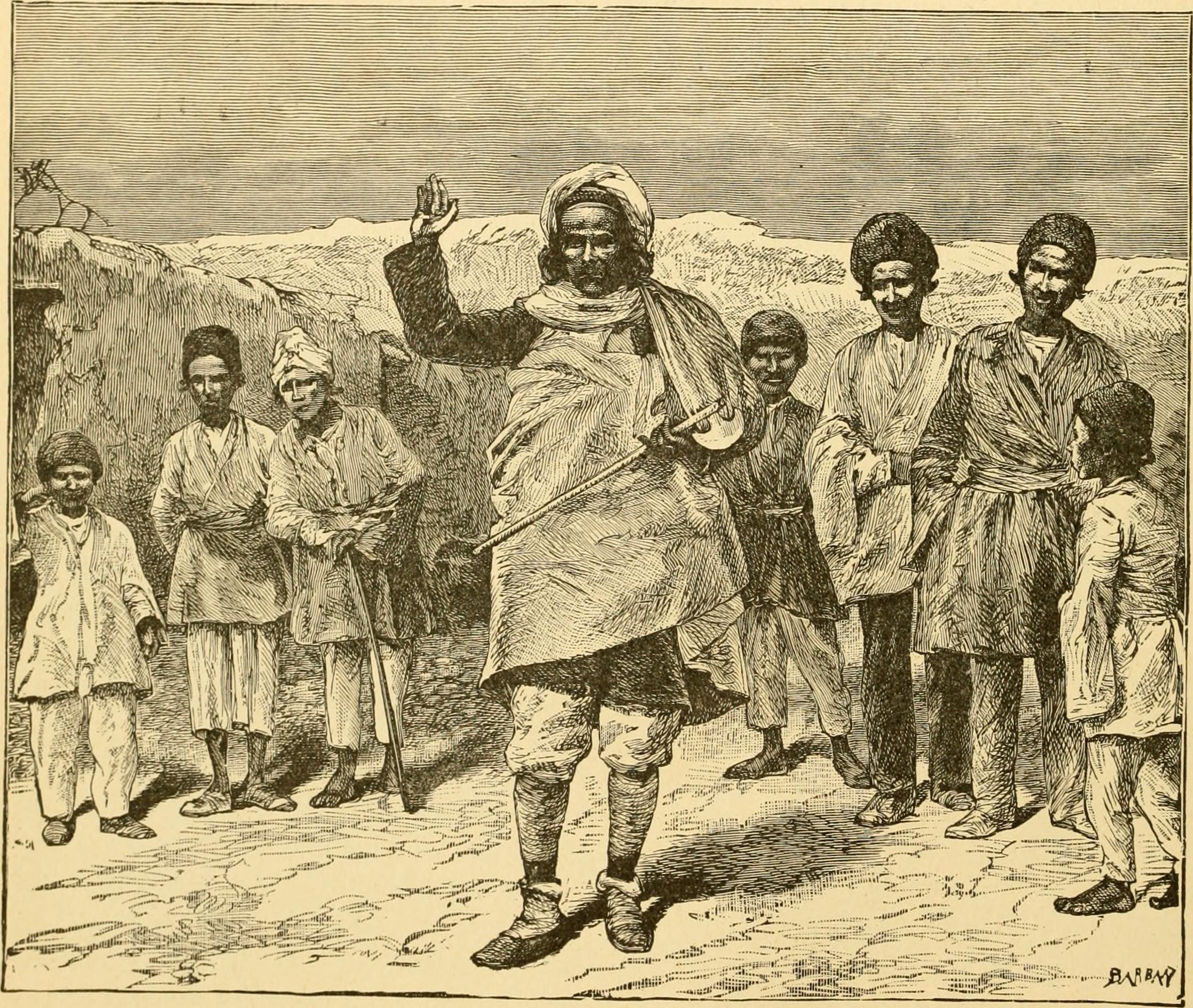
A Chaldean Storyteller; from Ridpath's History of the World

Charles Barbant (15 July 1844, Paris – 10 May 1921, Paris) was a French wood-engraver and illustrator.

== Biography ==
His father was the engraver, Nicolas Barbant (1806–1879), from whom he received his first lessons. After having worked for the wood-engraver Jean Best (1808–1879) at the "Atelier ABL", from 1863 to 1866, he became an associate of his father. In 1871, he married Louise Angélina Gauchard; daughter of the wood-engraver, Félix-Jean Gauchard (1825–1872). Following her death in 1894, he married one of his students, Marie-Juliette Aliot.

His workshop was one of the largest in Paris; specializing in wood engraving for multiple reproductions; generally in the form of a stamp. He was part of a small clique of engravers; with Charles Laplante, Henri Théophile Hildibrand and Fortuné Méaulle, who worked for Louis Hachette. Between 1869 and 1882, he was part of a group providing illustrations for the works of Jules Verne; together with illustrators such as Léon Benett, Jules Férat, Henri de Montaut, Édouard Riou and George Roux.

In the 1880s, one of his apprentices was Gôda Kiyoshi, who later became one of the masters of Japanese wood-engraving. His son, Auguste, also became an engraver and his daughter, Blanche, married the Brazilian illustrator, Henrique Alvim Corrêa. His daughter from his first marriage, Jeanne Paule Julie, married the composer, Edmond Missa.

In addition to the illustrations for Verne, he made wood-engravings from drawings by Gustave Doré.
