= Hjortekær =

- Neighbourhood
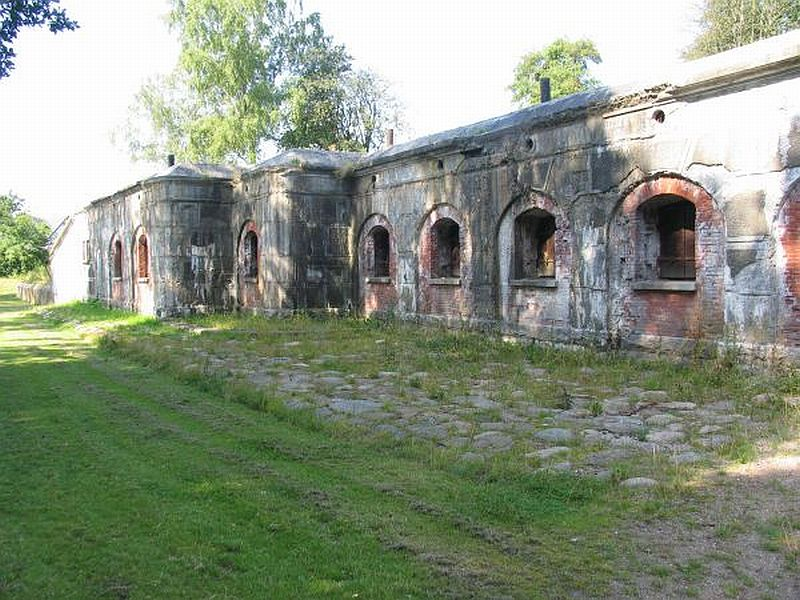

- Location in the Capital Region of Denmark
- Coordinates: 55°47′32″N 12°32′15″E
- Country: Denmark
- Region: Capital Region
- Municipality: Lyngby-Taarbæk
- Time zone: UTC+1 (CET)
  - Summer (DST): UTC+2 (CEST)

Hjortekær is a neighbourhood in Lyngby-Taarbæk Municipality, in the Region Hovedstaden. It is located north of Fortunen, east of Lundtofte and west of Jægersborg Dyrehave. The Technical University of Denmark has used localities in Hjortekær for surveying education since 1890.
