= Fortune (name) =

Fortune is both a surname and a given name. Notable people with the name include:

== People ==
=== Surname ===
- Amos Fortune (citizen of Jaffrey) (c. 1710–1801), African American ex-slave and businessman
- Dion Fortune (1890–1946), born Violet Mary Firth, British occultist and author
- Jesse Fortune (1930–2009), American Chicago blues singer
- J.D. Fortune (1973), Canadian singer and songwriter who fronted the band INXS from September 2005 till August 2011
- Jimmy Fortune (born 1955), American country music singer
- Jimmy Fortune (born 1972), Irish jockey
- John Fortune (1939–2013), Born John Courtney Wood, British comedian best known for his work on the TV series Bremner, Bird and Fortune
- Kwaku Fortune, Irish actor
- Marc-Antoine Fortuné (born 1981), French Guianese football player
- O'Donnell Fortune (born 2001), American football player
- Quinton Fortune (born 1977), South African football player
- Robert Fortune (1812–1880), Scottish botanist and traveller best known for introducing tea plants from China to India
- Rose Fortune (1774–1864), African American businessperson and first female police officer in Canada
- Scott Fortune (born 1966), American former volleyball player
- Seán Fortune (1954–1999), Irish priest and alleged child molester
- Sonny Fortune (1939–2018), American jazz musician
- Steven Fortune, computer scientist, the namesake of Fortune's algorithm for the convex hull problem
- Timothy Thomas Fortune (1856–1928), American orator, civil rights leader, journalist, writer, editor and publisher
- Victor Fortune (1883–1949), British Army major general
- William Fortune (businessman) (1863-1942), American businessman, journalist, and civic leader
- William Fortune (1897-1947), American football player.

=== Given name ===
- Fortune (circa 1743–1798), African-American slave
- Fortune Feimster (born 1980), American comedian and actor
- Fortune FitzRoy, Duchess of Grafton (1920-2021) British Mistress of the Robes
- Fortune Gallo (1878–1970), opera impresario
- Fortune Gordien (1922–1990), American athlete, primarily in the discus throw
- Fortuné Méaulle (1844–1901), French wood-engraver

== Fictional characters ==
- Amos Fortune (character), DC Comics supervillain
- Anna Fortune, DC Comics character
- Dominic Fortune, Marvel Comics character
- Reginald Fortune, fictional detective of H. C. Bailey
- Fortune, character from Metal Gear Solid 2: Sons of Liberty
- Ms. Fortune (real name Nadia), a character from the fighting game Skullgirls
- Miss Fortune (real name Sarah), the Bounty Hunter, a playable champion character in the multiplayer online battle arena video game League of Legends
