= Fortune Island =

Fortune Island can refer to:

- Fortune Island (Bahamas), usually known as Long Cay
- Fortune Island (Philippines), an island in Nasugbu, Batangas, site of the sinking of the San Diego in 1600
- Fortune Island, in Fortune Lake, North Frontenac, Ontario, Canada
- Fortune Islet (îlet Fortune), island in Goyave, Guadeloupe
- Fortunes Island, in Lake of the Woods, Ontario, Canada
- Fortune Islands, part of the Kerguelen Islands

== See also ==
- Fortune (disambiguation)
