= Henri Théophile Hildibrand =

French wood engraver (1824–1897)

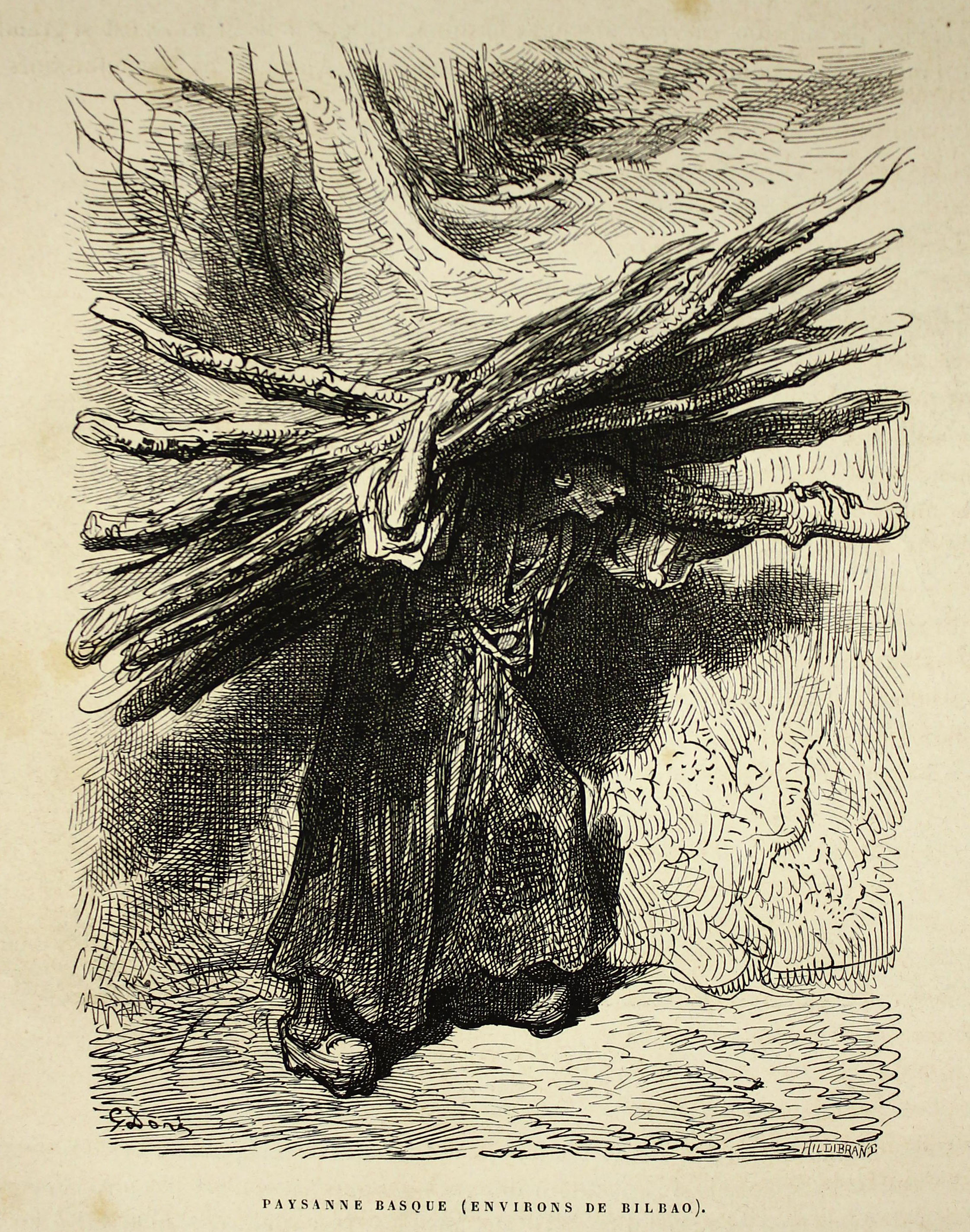
Basque Peasant; from L'Espagne by Jean Charles Davillier (1874)

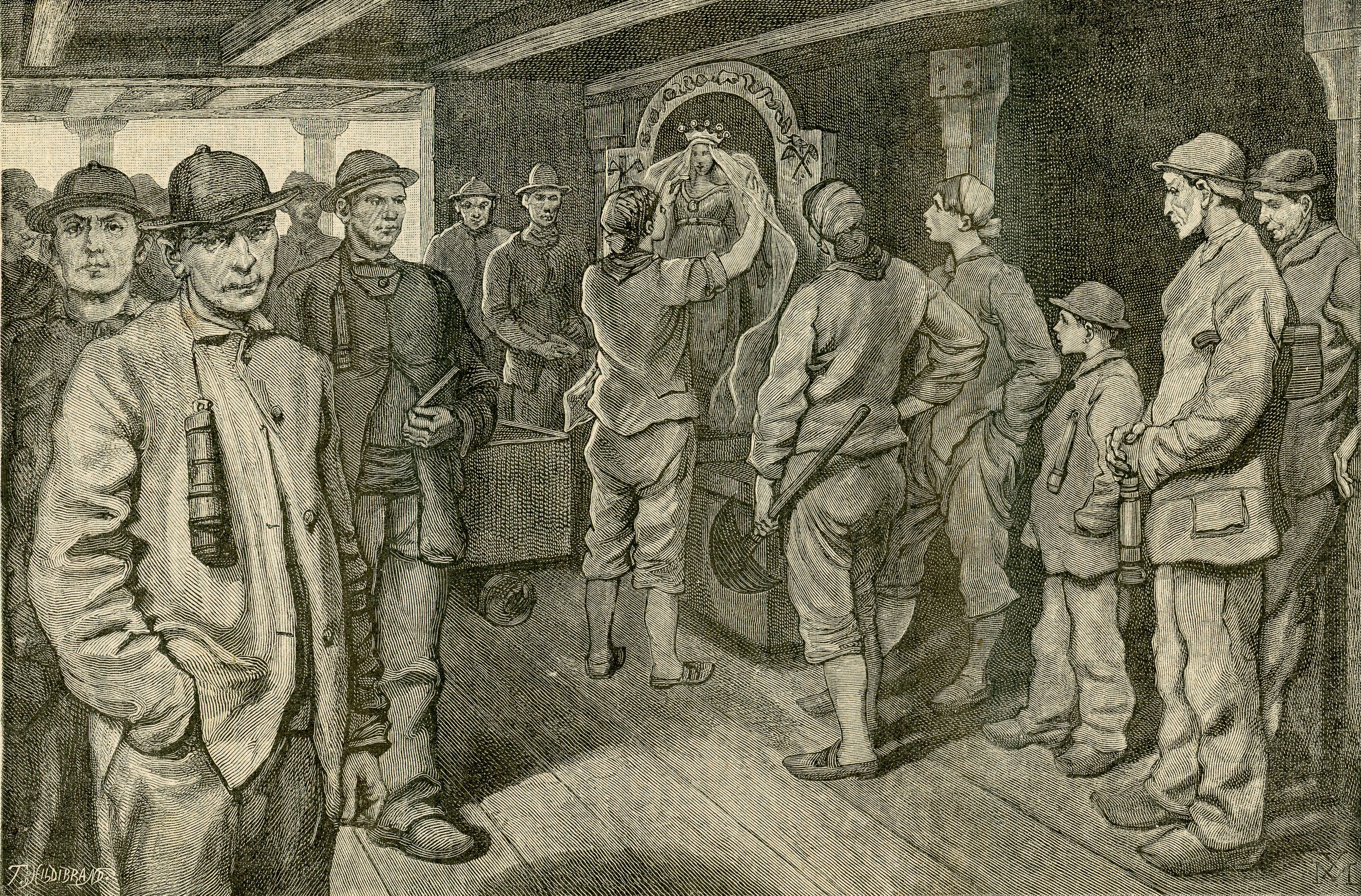
Miners in Belgium, adoring a statue of Santa Barbara; from L’illustrazione popolare (1887)

Henri Théophile Hildibrand (19 June 1824, Paris – 13 August 1897, Pacy-sur-Eure) was a French wood-engraver; primarily for the firms of Hetzel and Hachette.

== Life and work ==
He studied engraving at the "Atelier ABL", founded in 1832 by British wood-engraver John Andrew, Jean Best (1808–1879), and Isidore Leloir (born c.1803) to create vignettes for Le Magasin pittoresque.

In the early part of his career, he was an associate of François Pannemaker. At that time, he became one of the best known translators of the works of Gustave Doré and a master of colored engraving.

In 1845, he was one of a group of printmakers that composed over 200 illustrations for Mysteries of the Inquisition, and other secret societies of Spain by "Victor De Féréal" (a pseudonym). Published by Boizard, it became a great success and a bit of a scandal.

He also worked with the publishing firm of Hetzel; notably on illustrations for the novels of Jules Verne. Together with Charles Laplante, Charles Barbant and, for a time, Fortuné Méaulle, he worked with Hachette on their Bibliothèque rose series for young readers.

Some of his works also appeared in periodicals, such as Le Tour du monde, where many of his wood-engravings were based on photographs (via drawings); notably those of Émile Gsell.
