= William Fortune (businessman) =

American businessman, journalist, and civic leader (1863 to 1942)

- Born: May 23, 1863; Boonville, Indiana, US
- Died: January 28, 1942 (aged 78); Indianapolis, Indiana, US
- Resting place: Crown Hill Cemetery and Arboretum Section 61 Lot 62; 39.819585°N 86.177351°W
- Occupations: Newspaperman, business executive, and civic leader
- Board member of: Eli Lilly and Company (1913–27)
- Spouse: Mary Belle "May" (Knubbe) Fortune (1865–1898)
- Children: 3

William Fortune (May 27, 1863 – January 28, 1942) was a wealthy American businessman, journalist, and civic leader who was a prominent figure in the development of Indianapolis, Indiana, for more than five decades. Fortune is best known for his support of paved city and state roads as part of the Good Roads Movement and leading a thirty-year effort to elevate railroad tracks in Indianapolis, in addition to leadership in several civic organizations. In 1890 he helped establish the Commercial Club, the forerunner to the Indianapolis Chamber of Commerce; in 1916 he was a founder of the Indianapolis chapter of the American Red Cross; and in 1918 he led a local War Chest fundraising effort, which was a forerunner to the city's present-day United Way campaigns. In 1920 Fortune purchased the home where Hoosier poet James Whitcomb Riley once lived in Indianapolis in order to preserve it. Fortune retained the property, which is listed on the National Register of Historic Places, until the nonprofit James Whitcomb Riley Memorial Association was formed in 1922. Fortune also acquired and donated a 30-acre (12-hectare) site in Indianapolis in 1930 for a U.S. Veterans Health Administration hospital that was completed in 1931.

Fortune began his career in Indianapolis in 1882 as a newspaper reporter for the Indianapolis Journal (1882–88), worked briefly for the weekly Sunday Press (1888), and spent two years as a reporter and editorial writer for the Indianapolis News (1889–91). Fortune published Paving and Municipal Engineering (renamed Municipal Engineering in 1896), a paving industry trade magazine, from 1890 to 1911. Other business interests include serving as president (1910–24) of a group of independent telephone companies that later became part of Indiana Bell. Fortune was also member of the Eli Lilly and Company board of directors (1913–27). Fortune was an active promoter for the City of Indianapolis. He served as the Indianapolis Commercial Club's vice president (1894) and president (1897), as well as the first president of the Indianapolis Chamber of Commerce (1917). Fortune helped plan the construction of the Commercial Club's eight-story building, Indianapolis's first "skyscraper," which opened in 1893, the same year he served as executive director of the twenty-seventh encampment of the Grand Army of the Republic, the city's first major convention. Fortune was also the first president of the Indianapolis Automobile Club (1904–06) and the first president of the Indianapolis chapter of the American Red Cross (1916–42). In his later years, he was active at the national level in the Chamber of Commerce and the American Red Cross. He died in Indianapolis, Indiana, and is buried at Crown Hill Cemetery, Indianapolis.

== Early life and education ==
William "Will" Fortune was born on May 27, 1863, in Boonville, Warrick County, Indiana, the oldest of Mary (St. Clair) and William Harrison Fortune's five children. William Harrison Fortune served as a corporal in the 1st Indiana Cavalry Regiment during the American Civil War and found work as a blacksmith and watchmaker after mustering out of the military, but he frequently suffered from ill health. The family also moved often. Mary and William Harrison Fortune divorced in 1877. After the divorce, Mary Fortune supported herself and her three surviving children by running a boardinghouse in Boonville and William Harrison Fortune had little to no further contact with his children and former wife.

During his youth, Will Fortune was largely self-taught through reading and work experiences. He received only a basic education before beginning an apprenticeship at the Boonville Standard at the age of thirteen. Fortune also developed an early interest in writing and interviewing people. At the age of seventeen, he wrote a history of Warrick County, Indiana, which was published in 1881. Fortune began a lifelong interest in studying the life of Abraham Lincoln while still a teenager. In late 1881 he joined General James C. Veatch in conducting interviews and taking notes of conversations with several people in nearby Spencer County, Indiana, who had known Lincoln during his youth.

== Marriage and family ==
On November 25, 1884, William Fortune married Mary Belle "May" Knubbe (December 23, 1865 – September 28, 1898), the daughter of Jerusha Ann (Perley) and Fred Knubbe of Michigan City, Indiana. May Fortune died of diabetes at the age of thirty-three. Fortune never remarried and spent the rest of his life actively involved in business and civic affairs, which included leadership roles in local and national philanthropies.

William and May Fortune had three children; a son, Russell Fortune Sr., and two daughters, Evelyn (Fortune) Lilly Bartlett and Madeline (Fortune) Elder. Russell Fortune Sr. (1885–1970) married Elinor Lemcke (1884–1954) and had three sons: Russell Fortune Jr., William Lemcke Fortune, and Robert Patrick O’Riley Fortune. A year after Elinor Fortune's death in 1954, Russell Fortune Sr. married Mary Pinnell. The Fortunes' older daughter, Evelyn Fortune (1887–1997), married Eli Lilly Jr. (1885–1977), on August 27, 1907; they divorced in 1927. Evelyn and Eli Lilly's only surviving child was Evelyn "Evie" (Lilly) Lutz (1918–70). Evelyn Fortune Lilly married Frederic Clay Bartlett in June 1931; he died in 1956. She later married Daniel Huger, but the couple divorced in 1969. Madeline Fortune (1889–1992), the youngest daughter, married Bowman Elder (1887–1954). The couple had two children: a daughter, Ann (Elder) Schermerhorn, and a son, William Elder II.

The Fortune family's main residence was at Woodruff Place, a suburban neighborhood located east of downtown Indianapolis. After the death of his wife in 1898, Fortune resided at homes on North Pennsylvania Street and on North Delaware Street. In 1931 he purchased a 9-acre (3.6-hectare) property at Trader's Point in New Augusta, Indiana, on the northwest side of Indianapolis, which he intended to use as a summer residence. The Fortune family also spent some of their earlier summers at Indiana's Lake Wawasee.

== Career ==
Fortune began his career in Indianapolis in 1882 as a newspaper reporter and later published a paving industry trade magazine. From 1910 to 1924 he served as president of a group of independent telephone companies. From 1913 to 1927 Fortune served as a member of the board of directors of Eli Lilly and Company. Fortune also took an active role in supporting and promoting the development of the city. Fortune was active as a member of the Indianapolis Commercial Club, led efforts to elevate railroad tracks in the city, founded a local chapter of the American Red Cross, participated in community fundraising efforts, and became an advocate for paving Indianapolis streets and the Good Roads Movement, among other business and civic interests.

=== Journalist, editor, and publisher ===
Fortune began training for a career in newspaper publishing as a young teen when he apprenticed at the Standard, a Boonville, Indiana, newspaper. He moved to Indianapolis in 1882 to become a news reporter for the Indianapolis Journal. Fortune also worked as city editor at the Journal before resigning in 1888 due to poor health. During Benjamin Harrison's presidential campaign in 1888, Fortune worked as a local political correspondent for the New-York Tribune, the Philadelphia Press, and the Chicago Tribune.

Through his work as a journalist, Fortune became friends with notable residents of Indianapolis that included writers such as James Whitcomb Riley and Meredith Nicholson and influential business leaders that included Colonel Eli Lilly and Josiah K. Lilly Sr. In 1888 Fortune continued a career in journalism during a brief stint as editor of the weekly Sunday Press before joining the Indianapolis News in 1889 as a reporter and editorial writer for the next two years. In 1890 Fortune and several other journalists founded the Indianapolis Press Club, which remained active for twenty-five years. Fortune also served as its first president.

Fortune, a longtime advocate of civic improvement, became especially interested in paving city streets and municipal sanitation. From 1890 to 1911 he was publisher and manager of a paving industry trade magazine called Paving and Municipal Engineering (renamed Municipal Engineering in 1896). Fortune turned over the operations of the publication over to his son, Russell, in 1910; it was sold in 1918. Fortune also wrote an article on the subject of paving that appeared in the October 1892 issue of Century Magazine.

=== Telephone company executive ===
From 1910 to 1924 Fortune served as president of a group of independent telephone companies that included Indianapolis Telephone Company and the New Telephone Company. The independent phone companies were later sold to Indiana Bell.

On March 18, 1917, Fortune made the first Indianapolis Telephone Company call using an automatic dialing system that did not have to be routed through a central exchange (telephone operator). Fortune's call to the Indianapolis Star on a rotary-dial phone preceded the installation of the Bell Telephone's dialing system by several years. The Indianapolis Telephone Company's system was installed over a period of nine months at a cost of more than $1 million. Fortune also received the first incoming phone call over the Indianapolis Telephone Company's new system.

=== Eli Lilly and Company stockholder and board member ===
In 1913 Fortune was invited to invest $100,000 in Eli Lilly and Company stock, becoming the first non-Lilly family member to become an investor. Fortune also served on the company's board of directors from 1913 to 1927 and chair of its finance committee from 1916 to 1921.

== Civic leader and philanthropist ==
For more than five decades Fortune was an active promoter for the city of Indianapolis, where he was involved in civic affairs and philanthropic organizations, including several that he helped establish.

In 1890 Fortuned collaborated with Colonel Eli Lilly to found the Commercial Club, the forerunner to the Indianapolis Chamber of Commerce, which was established in 1911. Fortune received a salary as the club's secretary until 1894, when Colonel Lilly was president of the organization. In addition to other activities with the Commercial Club, Fortune was involved in planning construction of its new eight-story building, the city's first "skyscraper," which opened in 1893. Beginning in the early 1890s Fortune was active in the Commercial Club's efforts to increase and improve the pavement of Indianapolis's streets, including the organization of a national paving exposition in Indianapolis in 1890 to emphasize the need for municipal street improvements. Fortune became the Commercial Club's vice president in 1894 and served as its president in 1897. When the Commercial Club reorganized Indianapolis Chamber of Commerce in 1917, Fortune was elected the Chamber's first president. Fortune also collaborated with Colonel Lilly and other members of the Commercial Club to secure Indianapolis's selection as the site for the twenty-seventh encampment of the Grand Army of the Republic in 1893, the city's first major convention. Fortune served as executive director of the encampment, which attracted an estimated 100,000 veterans to Indianapolis. During the economic depression of 1893–94 Fortune supported the Commercial Club's program to aid workers and helping 2,000 local families through the winter months. In 1904 Fortune was one of the guides when the Commercial Club hosted a visit to Indiana for China's Prince Pu Lun.

Although Fortune never learned to drive, he was an avid automobile enthusiast. In the early 1890s, Fortune founded an automobile club in Indianapolis and advocated for improved roads in the state as part of the Good Roads Movement. He also served as the first president of the Indianapolis Automobile Club from 1904 to 1906. In addition, Fortune led the Commercial Club's thirty-year effort to elevate the railroad tracks to improve street and railroad traffic flow in the city. Fortune served as chair of the Commercial Club's Elevated Railroad Commission from 1898 until 1916. Opponents of the project sometimes called the effort "Fortune's Folly," but the work continued until it was finally completed in 1921.

Following the death in 1916 of his friend, Hoosier poet James Whitcomb Riley, Fortune lead efforts to preserve the Lockerbie Street home where Riley once lived in Indianapolis. Fortune purchased the historic home in 1920 and retained the property until 1922, when the nonprofit James Whitcomb Riley Memorial Association was formed and assumed management of the site.

In 1916 Fortune was one of the founders of a local chapter of the American Red Cross and served as president of the Indianapolis chapter from 1916 until his death in 1942. He was especially active in fundraising efforts and organizing local volunteers. Fortune helped organize disaster relief for tornado victims in Indiana and led efforts to equip a base hospital prior to its relocation in France during World War I. In addition, he organized local efforts to produce supplies for the soldiers. Fortune's other wartime efforts included organizing and leading a local War Chest drive in 1918 that raised more than $500,000 in a single week. This community fundraiser was a forerunner to the local United Way campaigns.

== Other interests ==
In addition to his varied business and philanthropic interests, Fortune was a world traveler. In January 1923 Fortune and his friend, J. K. Lilly Sr., the president and board chairman of Eli Lilly and Company, were among the 350 passengers who embarked on the first around-the-world cruise of Cunard Line's RMS Samaria, which returned to New York City on May 31, 1923. Fortune and the ship's other passengers called at ports in Portugal, Gibraltar, Algeria, Italy, Egypt, India, Ceylon (present-day Sri Lanka), Sumatra, Java, Singapore, the Philippines, Korea, and Japan, as well as cities such as Hong Kong, Honolulu, and San Francisco. The ship also traveled through the Panama Canal. One memorable land excursion included a train trip from Calcutta, India, to Rangoon, Burma (present-day Yangon, Myanmar).

== Later years ==
During the 1920 and the 1930s, Fortune continued to participate in several philanthropic projects at the local and national levels. In 1927 Fortune was appointed chair of the George Rogers Clark Sesquicentennial Commission. Although he led the commission's initial efforts to erect a George Rogers Clark memorial, Fortune resigned in 1928 following disagreements with other committee members. The project was completed in 1935. Fortune also acquired and donated in 1930 a 30-acre (12-hectare) site along Cold Spring Road in Indianapolis for construction of a U.S. Veterans Health Administration hospital that was completed in 1931. In addition, Fortune became active at the national level in Chamber of Commerce, serving on its Committee on State and Local Taxation and Expenditures and as a member of its advisory committee on war relief during World War II. He also served as president of the American Peace Society from 1928 until 1930 and as a member of the Executive Committee of the national Red Cross's Central Committee from 1939 until his death in 1942.

In his later years, Fortune joined Madeline and Bowman Elder, his daughter and son-in-law, and their family at their estate home at Trader's Point, northwest of Indianapolis. He also spent time at the Elders' summer home in Leland, Michigan.

== Death and legacy ==
Fortune suffered a heart attack and died at Indianapolis, Indiana, on January 28, 1942, at the age of seventy-eight. His remains are interred at Crown Hill Cemetery in Indianapolis.

Fortune became a wealthy and successful businessman, as well as a prominent figure in the development of Indianapolis. He was especially active in civic and philanthropic affairs during the years 1890 to 1920. Although he never sought elected office, Fortune frequently worked with politicians to implement various civic projects. Fortune is best known for his support of paved city and state roads, the implementation of the Good Roads Movement in the state, and the elevation of railroad tracks in Indianapolis. In addition to his active involvement with the city's Commercial Club and Indianapolis Chamber of Commerce projects, Fortune was a founder and organizer of the Indianapolis chapter of the American Red Cross, which continues to provide social services to aid to those in need, and War Chest fundraising efforts, a predecessor to the city's present-day United Way organization. During his later years Fortune was active at the national level in the American Red Cross and Chamber of Commerce. While most of his efforts proved to be successful, not all of them were. Fortune was impatient and not afraid to disagree with those who did not share his goals or vision for a particular project. For example, conflicts over goals and priorities lead to his resignation as chairman of the George Rogers Clark Sesquicentennial Commission in 1928 and as president of American Peace Society in 1930.

Fortune's local legacies include acquisition of James Whitcomb Riley's former home in Indianapolis. The present-day James Whitcomb Riley Museum Home, which is listed on the National Register of Historic Places and open to the public. Fortune also donated the site for a U.S. Veterans Health Administration hospital in Indianapolis.

== Honors and tributes ==
- A plaque honoring Fortune was installed among other notable residents of Warrick County, Indiana, on the public square in front of the Warrick County Courthouse in Boonville, Indiana.

== Sources ==
- Bodenhamer, David J., and Robert G. Barrows, eds. (1994). The Encyclopedia of Indianapolis. Bloomington and Indianapolis: Indiana University Press. pp. 594–95. ISBN 0-253-31222-1.
- Boomhower, Ray E. (Summer 2015). "Call from Mr. Fortune". Traces of Indiana and Midwestern History. 27 (3). Indianapolis: Indiana Historical Society: 3.
- Dobrzynski, Judith H (July 3, 1997). "Evelyn Bartlett, Patron of Art And Ornament, Dies at 109". New York Times.
- Fortune, Peter (1993). The Fortune Family of Indianapolis: From Virginia to Massachusetts. Weston, Massachusetts: Nobb Hill Press. OCLC 28530361.
- Fortune, Peter, and Lara Fortune Balter (Summer 2015). "Around the World in 128 Days". Traces of Indiana and Midwestern History. 27 (3). Indianapolis: Indiana Historical Society: 4–15.
- Latham, Charles (1985). William Fortune (1863–1942): A Hoosier Biography. Indianapolis: Guild Press of Indiana. ISBN 9781878208378.
- Madison, James H. (2006). Eli Lilly: A Life, 1885–1977 (2nd ed.). Indianapolis: Indiana Historical Society Press. ISBN 0871951975.
