= Fortunen =

- Neighbourhood
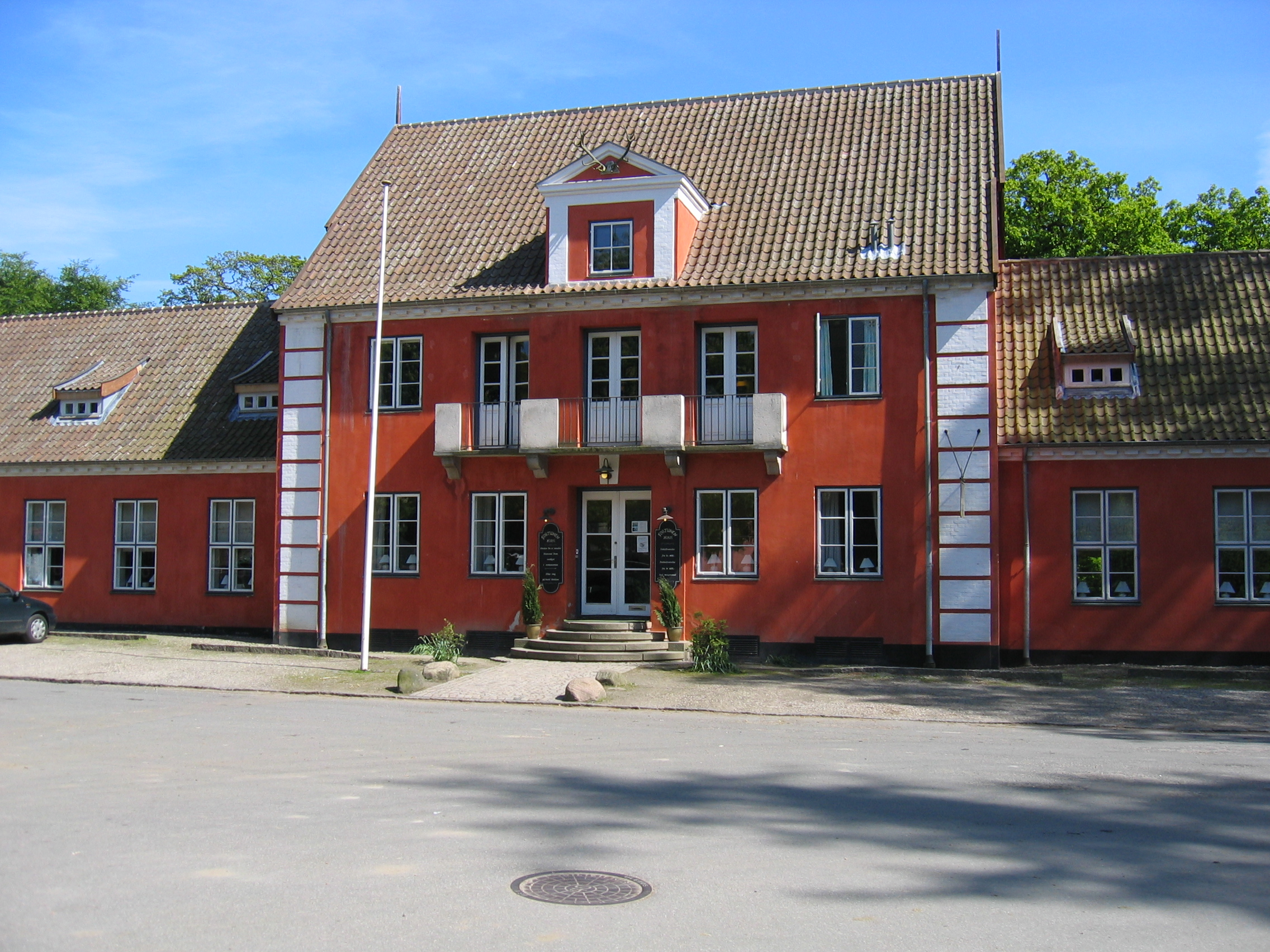
- Fortunen restaurant

- Location in the Capital Region of Denmark
- Coordinates: 55°46′30.51″N 12°32′38.96″E
- Country: Denmark
- Region: Capital Region
- Municipality: Lyngby-Taarbæk
- Time zone: UTC+1 (CET)
  - Summer (DST): UTC+2 (CEST)

Fortunen is a neighbourhood in Lyngby-Taarbæk Municipality, located north of Copenhagen, Denmark. It is located south of Hjortekær and east of Lundtofte and Kongens Lyngby. To the east of Fortunen is Jægersborg Dyrehave. Fortunen has existed since at least 1670, and was given royal permissions to house an inn since 1766.
