= Fortune (film) =

- Directed by: Muhiddin Muzaffar
- Starring: Abdumumin Sharifi; Salohuddin Shukurzoda; Firuza Rahmonova; Ahmadi Qutbuddin; Isfandiyar Ghulomzoda; Khoshruz Ergashov
- Music by: Iqbol Zaukibekov
- Production companies: Sugdsinema; Tojikfilm; Futura Magnum
- Release dates: 8 October 2022 (South Korea); 17 October 2022 (Russia); 28 October 2022 (Tajikistan)
- Running time: 118 minutes
- Country: Tajikistan
- Language: Tajik
- Budget: 1,146,000 somoni

Fortune is a Tajik drama film directed by Muhiddin Muzaffar and written by Bakhtiyar Karimov and Muhiddin Muzaffar, produced in 2022 by the studio Sugdsinema. The film premiered on 8 October in Busan, October 17 in Moscow, and 28 October 2022, in Dushanbe.

== Plot summary ==
The film depicts the story of two friends, Qahhor and Mannon, against the backdrop of the severe political and economic crisis of the 1990s in Tajikistan. They began working at an auto parts factory. Despite their reluctance, the circumstances forced them to steal and sell car parts from the factory.

Qahhor was in a strained personal situation. He envisioned a completely different future for himself and his sons. However, his eldest son, Alijon, went down a path of deceit, leaving Qahhor's only hope on his younger son, Azizjon, a student at the Moscow State Music Conservatory. Once, Mannon's request led Qahhor to give his salary to Mannon in exchange for some food and a lottery ticket. This ill-fated lottery ticket later caused discord among friends and led to division among the villagers. Qahhor won a "Moskvich" car in the lottery, which some villagers considered unfair. Mannon was disheartened. Although he had willingly given the lottery ticket to Qahhor, his only daughter was seriously ill and needed urgent treatment. This situation strained their friendship and led to tragedy. Due to these troubles, Qahhor fell ill and, after hearing about Azizjon, abandoned his studies at the conservatory, suffered a stroke, and died prematurely. However, a harsh truth emerged after Qahhor's death...

== Cast ==
The main cast members of the film are Abdumumin Sharifi, Salohuddin Shukurzoda, Firuza Rahmonova, Ahmadi Qutbuddin, Isfandiyar Ghulomzoda, and Khoshruz Ergashov.

== Production ==
The film was shot over 48 days from April 2 to May 18, 2021, in the town of Vokzali in Konibodom and the town of Naftobodi in Isfara, through a collaboration between Sugdsinema, Tojikfilm, and the production center Futura Magnum.

== Awards ==
The film won the "Best Artistic Film" award, and actor Salohuddin Shukurzoda won the "Best Actor" award at the national "Taji Somon" Awards.
