= SS Fortune =

History
- Name: Weserstrom (1943–45); Empire Galena (1945–47); Albatross (1947–58); Port Capetown (1958–59); Frontier (1959–66); Fortune (1966–68)
- Owner: Norddeutscher Lloyd (1944–45); Ministry of War Transport (1945–46); Ministry of Transport (1946–47); General Steam Navigation Co. (1947–58); National Shipping Lines (1958–59); African Coaster (Pty) Ltd. (1969–66); Summit Navigation Co. (1966–68)
- Operator: Norddeutscher Lloyd (1944–45); W Tully & Co. Ltd. (1945–47); General Steam Navigation Co. (1947–58); National Shipping Lines (1958–59); African Coaster (Pty) Ltd. (1969–66); Summit Navigation Co. (1966–68)
- Port of registry: (Nazi Germany) Bremen, Germany (1943–45); London, United Kingdom (1945–58); Cape Town, Union of South Africa (1958–59); (Union of South Africa) Durban (1959–61); Durban, South Africa (1961–66); Panama (1966–68)
- Builder: J Cockerill, SA
- Yard number: 701
- Launched: 25 August 1943
- Completed: January 1944
- Out of service: December 1968
- Identification: United Kingdom Official Number 180597 (1945–58); Code Letters GJGL (1945–58); IMO number: 5121990 ( -1968)
- Fate: Scrapped

General characteristics
- Class & type: Hansa A type Cargo ship
- Tonnage: 1,925 GRT, 936 NRT, 2,956 DWT
- Length: 85.19 m (279 ft 6 in)
- Beam: 13.49 m (44 ft 3 in)
- Draught: 8.20 m (26 ft 11 in)
- Depth: 4.78 m (15 ft 8 in)
- Installed power: Compound steam engine, 1,200IHP
- Propulsion: Single screw propeller
- Speed: 10.5 knots (19.4 km/h)
- Capacity: 4,862 cubic metres (171,700 cu ft)

Fortune was a Hansa A Type cargo ship which was built as Weserstrom in 1944 by J Cockerill SA, Antwerp, Belgium for Norddeutscher Lloyd, Bremen, Germany. She was seized as a prize of war in 1945, passing to the Ministry of War Transport and renamed Empire Galena. She was sold in 1947 and was renamed Albatross. She was sold in 1958 to South Africa and renamed Port Capetown. A further sale in 1959 saw her renamed Frontier. She was sold to Hong Kong in 1966 and was renamed Fortune. She served until 1968 when she was scrapped.

== Description ==
The ship was 85.19 m (279 ft 6 in) long, with a beam of 13.49 m (44 ft 3 in). She had a depth of 4.78 m (15 ft 8 in), and a draught of 8.20 m (26 ft 11 in). She was assessed as 1,926 GRT, 936 NRT, 2,956 DWT. She had a cargo capacity of 4,862 cubic metres (171,700 cu ft).

The ship was propelled by a compound steam engine, which had two cylinders of 42 cm (16 9/16 inches) and two cylinders of 90 cm (35 7/16 inches) diameter by 90 cm (35 7/16 inches) stroke. The engine was built by Rheinmetall-Borsig AG, Berlin. Rated at 1,200IHP, it drove a single screw propeller and could propel the ship at 10.5 knots (19.4 km/h).

== History ==
Weserstrom was a Hansa A Type cargo ship built in 1943 as yard number 701 by J Cockerill SA, Antwerp, Belgium for Norddeutscher Lloyd, Bremen, Germany. She was completed in January 1944. Her port of registry was Bremen.

In May 1945, Weserstrom was seized as a prize of war at Kiel. She was passed to the Ministry of War Transport. She was renamed Empire Galena. The Code Letters GJGL and United Kingdom Official Number 180597 were allocated. Her port of registry was London and she was operated under the management of W Tulley & Co. Ltd., Hull.

On 6 March 1947, Empire Galena was sold to the General Steam Navigation Co Ltd. She was renamed Albatross on 30 July.

On 2 April 1958, Albatross was sold for £51,500 to the National Shipping Lines of South Africa and was renamed Port Capetown.. She was sold in 1959 to African Coasters (Pty) Ltd, Durban and renamed Frontier. With their introduction in the 1960s, Frontier was allocated the IMO Number 5121990.

In 1966, Frontier was sold to Summit Navigation Co., Panama and was renamed Fortune. She was operated under the management of Mollers Ltd, Hong Kong. She served until 1968 and was scrapped at Hong Kong in December.
