= Gérard Fortuné =

Haitian visual artist (died 2019)

Gérard Fortuné, commonly known by his first name Gerard, (c. 1925 – December 8, 2019) was a Haitian visual artist.

== Early life ==
His exact date of birth is uncertain, one biography lists it at 1933, another firmly at May 2, 1925, though he said he was alive during the Haitian dictatorship of Jean Claude Duvalier. Gerard was born in Montagne Noire, above Pétion-Ville, a suburb of the Haitian capital Port-au-Prince.

== Style and works ==
Gerard worked as a houngan (Vodou priest) and pastry chef before starting to paint in 1978. He continued making new pieces, always in naive style – a brightly colored, childlike, style of painting.

The subjects of Gerard's paintings are vast, ranging from everyday matters, Biblical scenes, portraits of Haitian generals and politicians, animals and athletes. Gerard himself has said, “I’m obligated to paint vodou and Jesus and flowers and the sea. And villages and anything that comes to mind.” “God tells me what to paint, the feeling of each painting.” He says that God gives hope to him. “Inspiration comes from God at all hours."

== Exhibits ==
His work has been exhibited internationally in places like Nottingham Contemporary. Two of the places that include Gerard's work in their permanent collections are Ramapo College, New Jersey and the Waterloo Center for the Arts in Waterloo, Iowa.

Gerard died on December 8, 2019.

== Additional sources ==
- Gerard Fortune, (Collection Monnin: Petionville, Haiti, 2014).
- Philippe Bécoulet, Dialogue du Réel et de L’imaginaire,( Association Franco-Haitienne, Haiti,1990).
