= Henri de Montaut =

French engraver (c. 1825–1900)

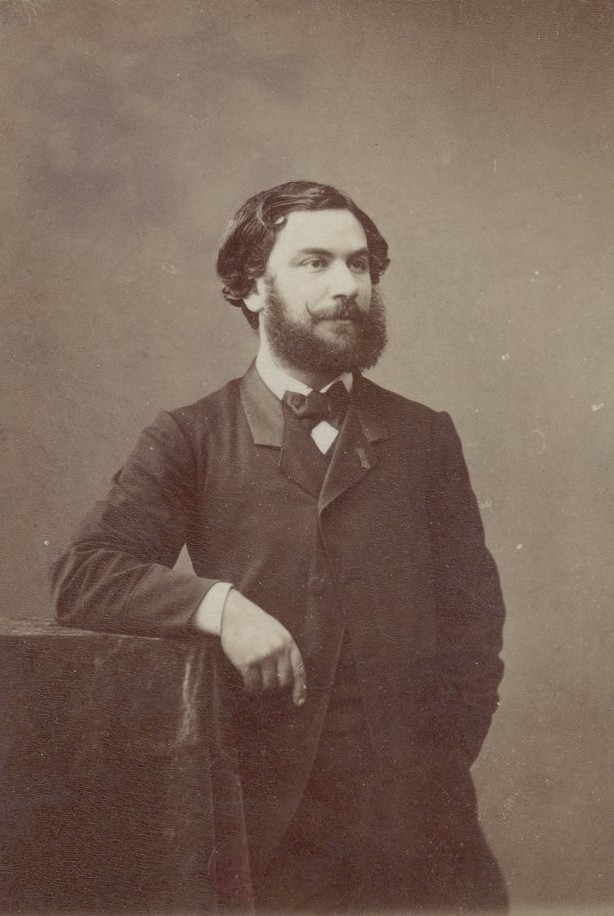
Henri de Montaut

Henri de Montaut (1825 or 1830 – 1890 or 1900) was a French draftsman, engraver, and illustrator of the 19th century. He sometimes signed Henri de Hem, Monta or Hy.

== Career ==
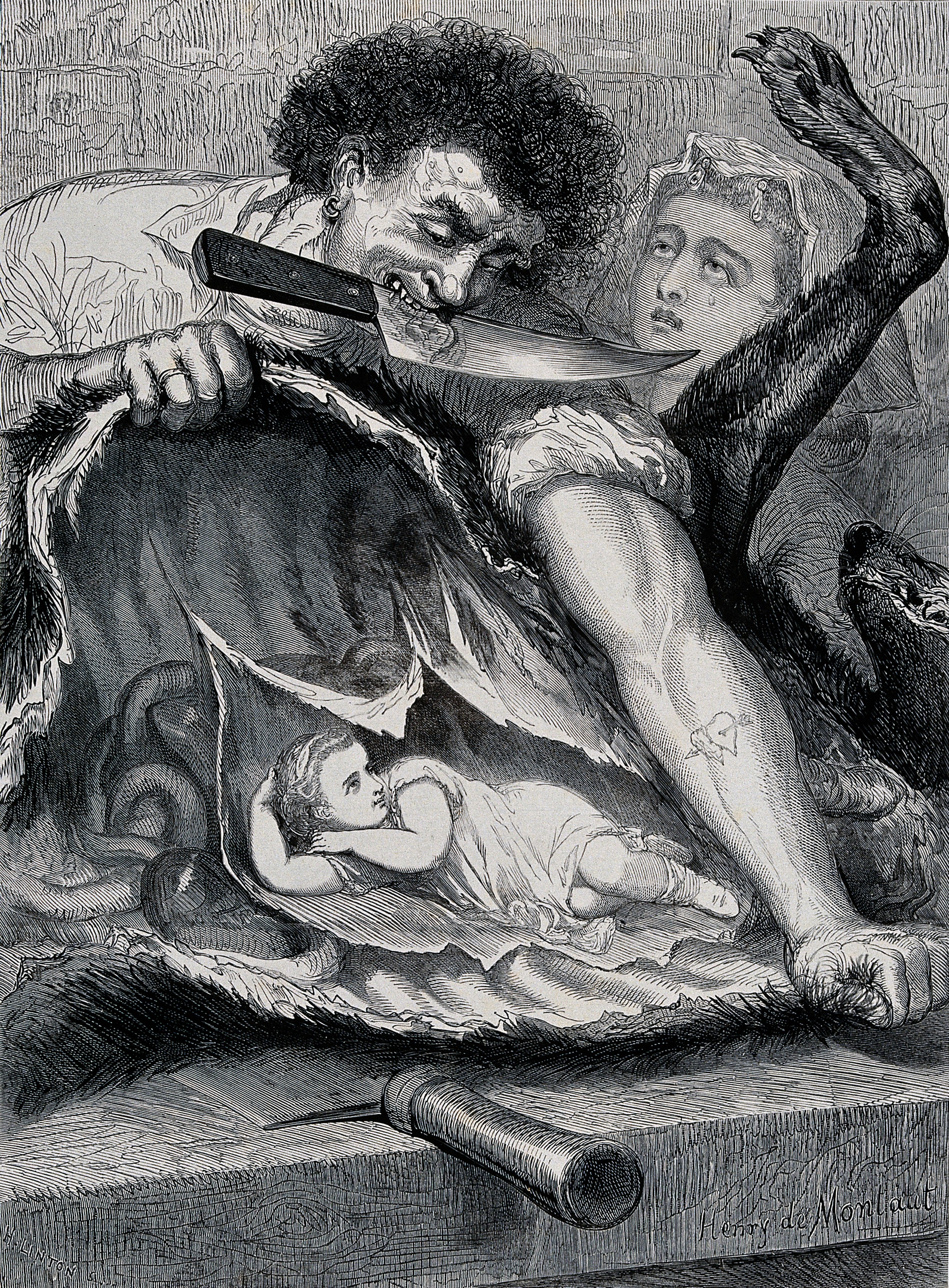
Illustration for Little Red Riding Hood (Librairie du Petit Journal, 1865).

Henri de Montaut, with other artists such as Édouard Riou or George Roux, is remembered for the illustrations they made for the novels of the series Voyages extraordinaires by Jules Verne.

He collaborated with Le Journal illustré for which he was chief editor for a time as well as with La Vie Parisienne.

In 1883, he became chief editor of L'Art et la mode, journal de la vie mondaine.
