= Le Journal illustré =

1864–1899 French weekly newspaper

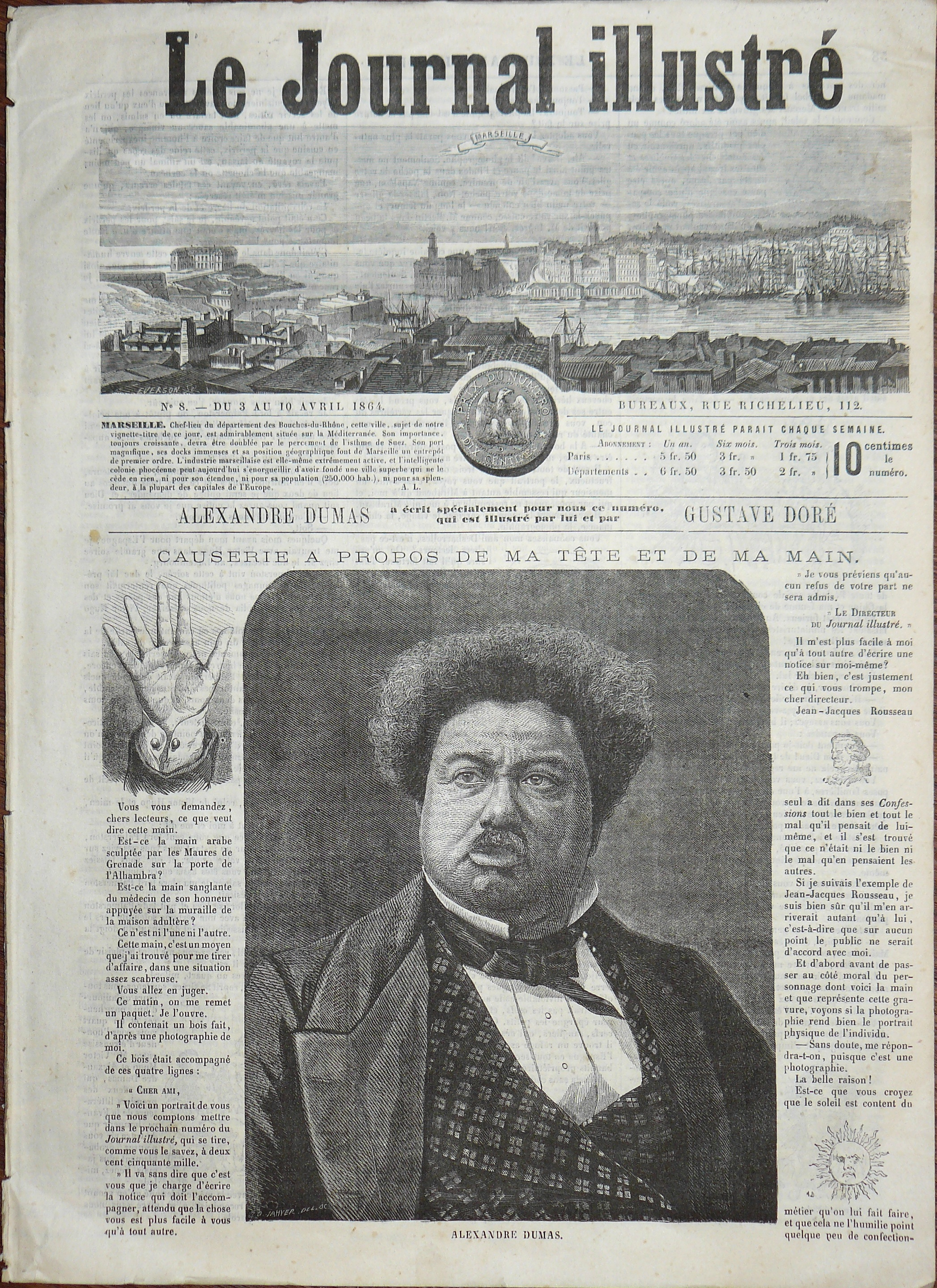
Front page from April 3, 1864

Le Journal illustré, or The illustrated Journal, was a French weekly newspaper established in February 1864 and discontinued in 1899. It was modelled on the Penny Illustrated Paper released in 1861 in England. It was illustrated with wood-engravings and covered a wide range of topics in a large-format, eight-page magazine measuring 27 by 37.5 centimetres (10.6 in × 14.8 in). A few years later, it was integrated into the media group's Diary.

Designed to compete with L'Illustration which was sold at 75 cents, Le Journal illustré was sold for 10 cents. It disappeared in 1899 when the illustrated supplement of color-illustrated Le Petit Journal, published by the same media group and available since 1890, supplanted it.

In September 1886, the journal published the centenary interview of the scientist Eugène Chevreul (1786–1889), illustrated by Nadar in a series of photographs reproduced in wood-engraving, which may be the first published piece of its kind to include photographic reproductions.

== Bibliography ==
- Jean-Pierre Bacot (2005). La presse illustrée au 19e siècle (in French). Presses universitaires de Limoges. ISBN 978-2-84287-363-9.
