= Fortuné Méaulle =

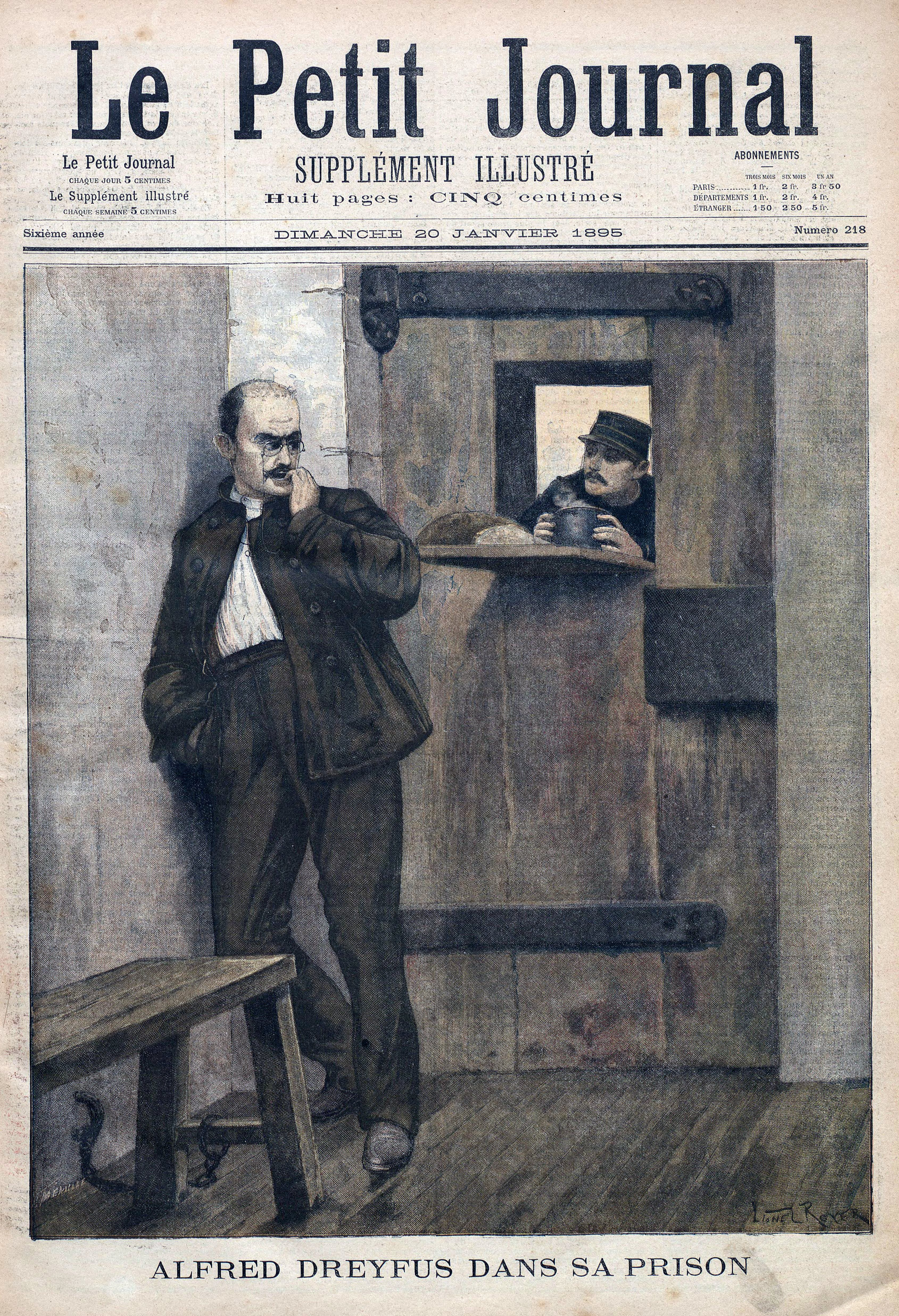
Dreyfus in Prison (1895; Méaulle after Lionel Royer)

Fortuné Louis Méaulle (11 April 1844, Angers – 11 May 1916) was a French wood-engraver and writer.

== Biography ==
He apprenticed with Joseph Burn-Smeeton (fl.1840-1880), a British-born artist who worked with the French wood-engraver Auguste Tilly (1840–1898). Later, he was able to become part of a small, exclusive group of wood-engravers who worked for Louis Hachette; consisting of Charles Laplante, Henri Théophile Hildibrand and Charles Barbant. He did not remain there long, however; being dismissed for "serious misconduct."

He then established his own studio and was one of the first artists to work with Daniel Vierge. Among his most notable illustrations are those made from pen and ink drawings by François Chifflart for The Toilers of the Sea by Victor Hugo, although Hugo had originally wanted them to be brush wash drawings, concerned that the resultant wood-engravings would not match the spirit of his writing. After seeing samples, he was convinced and changed his mind.

The output of Méaulle's studio was large, but of an uneven quality. The bulk of his work involved covers for the illustrated supplement to Le Petit Journal, most of them designed by Henri Meyer. He also produced large double-paged supplements and worked for the French newspapers Le Journal Illustré and Le Monde Illustré.

As a writer, he published books on art, children's books and juvenile fiction, some illustrated by other artists.

== Gallery ==
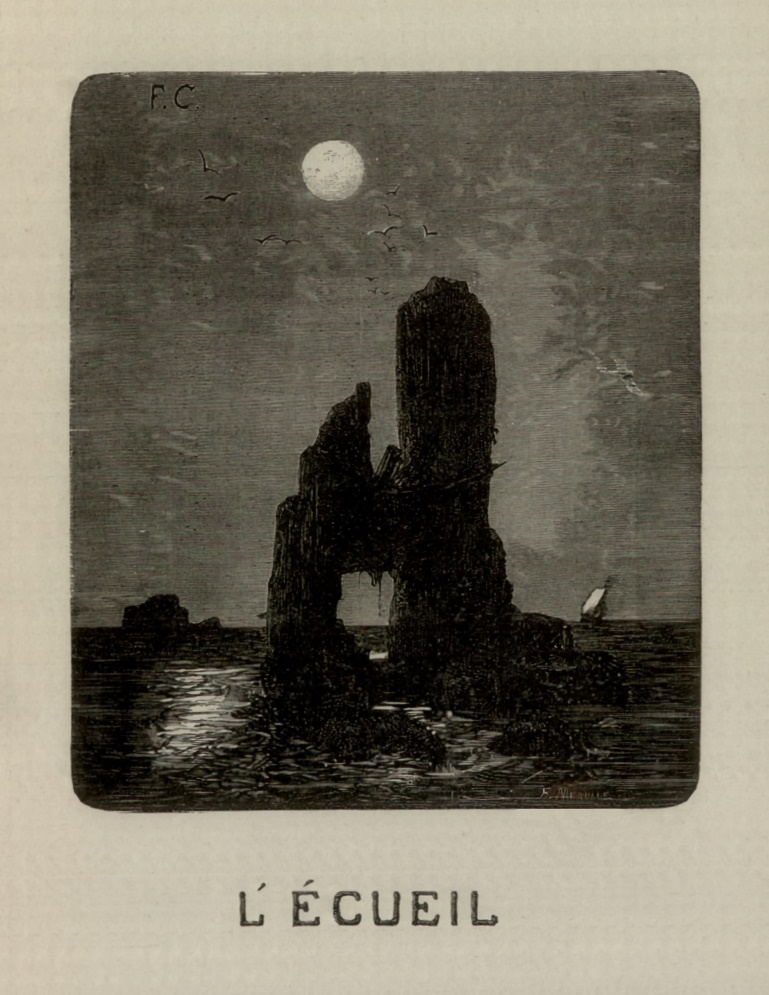
The Toilers of the Sea (illustration)

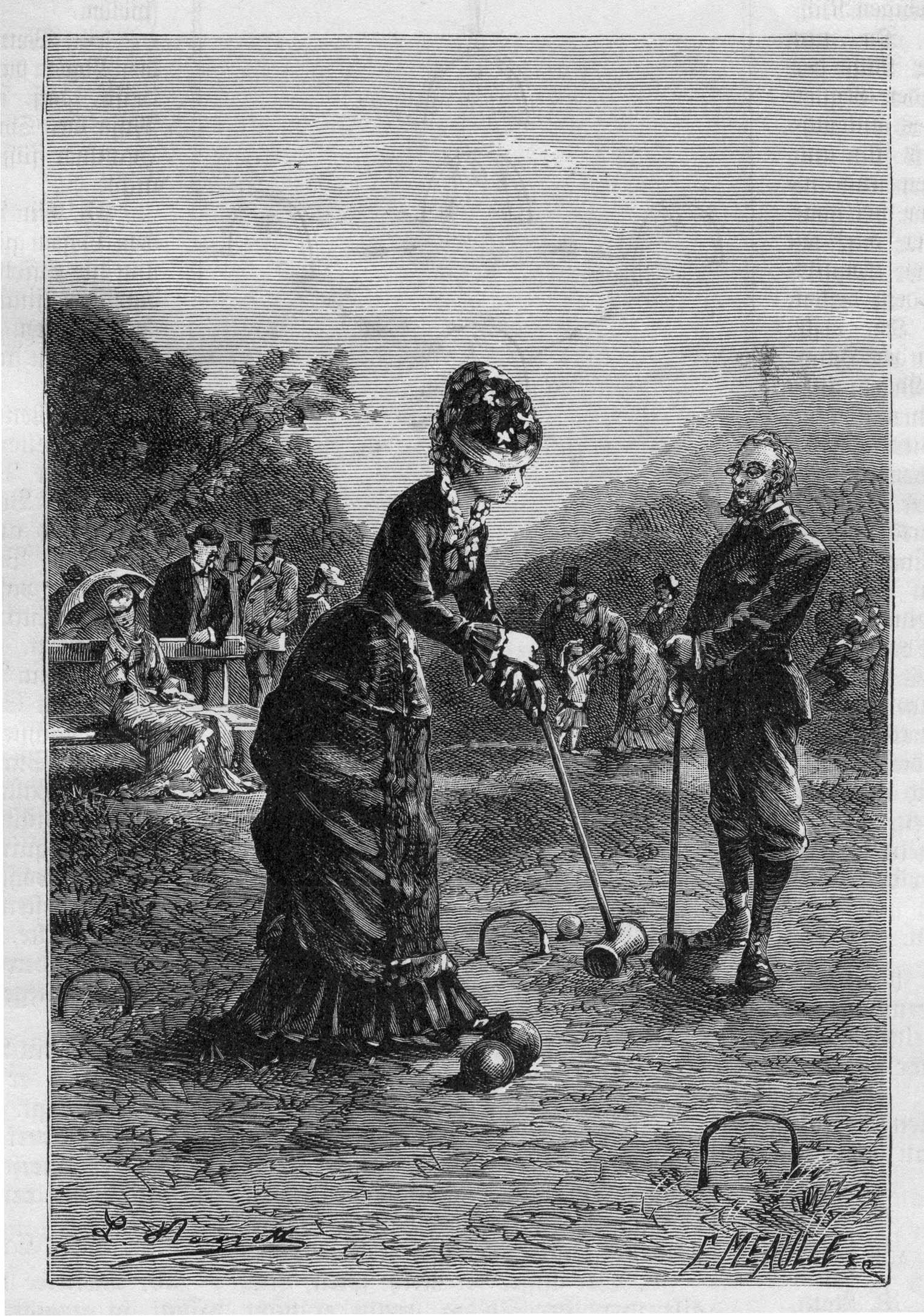
Croquet, 1889

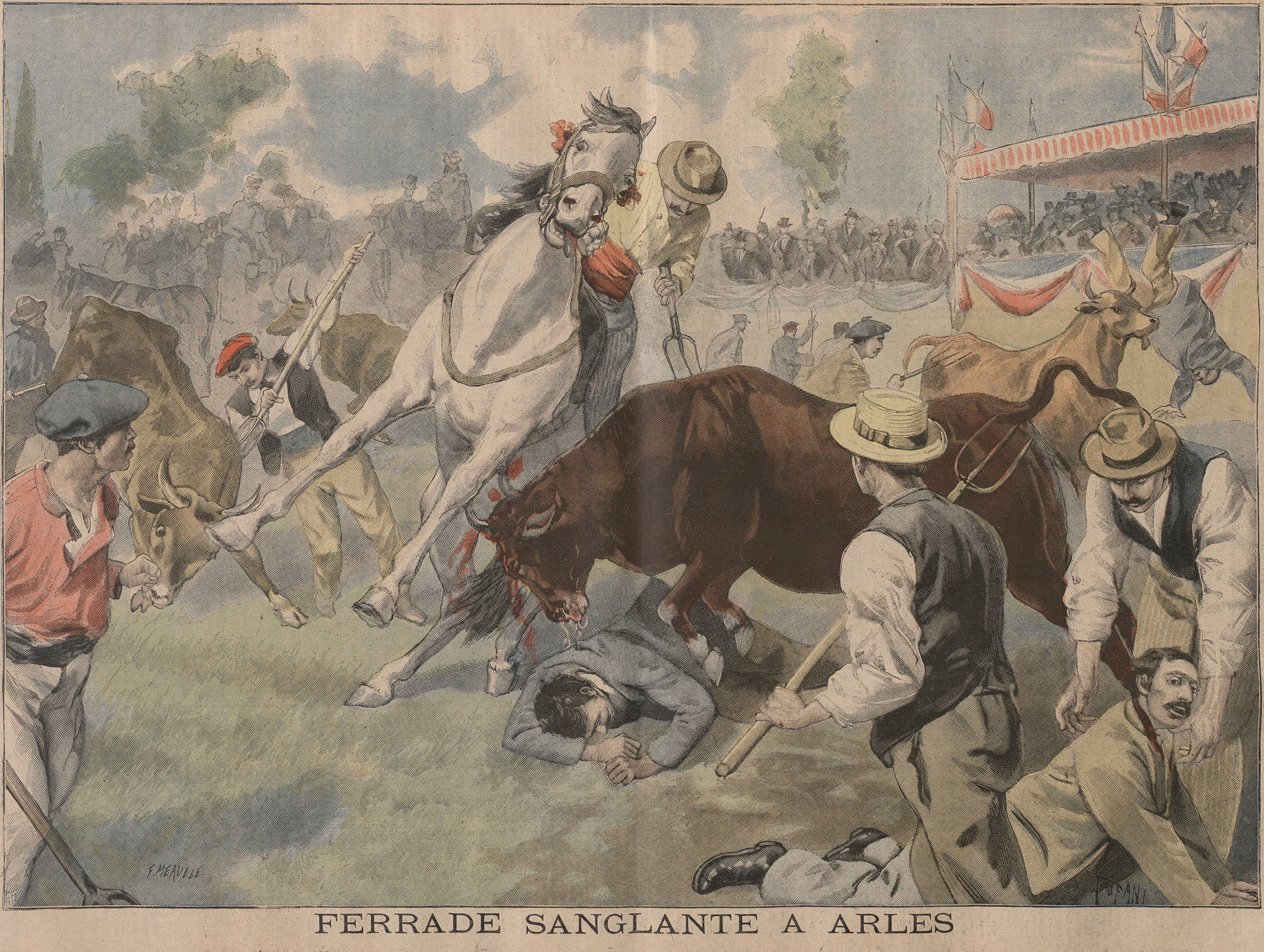
Bloody Ferrade in Arles, 1898

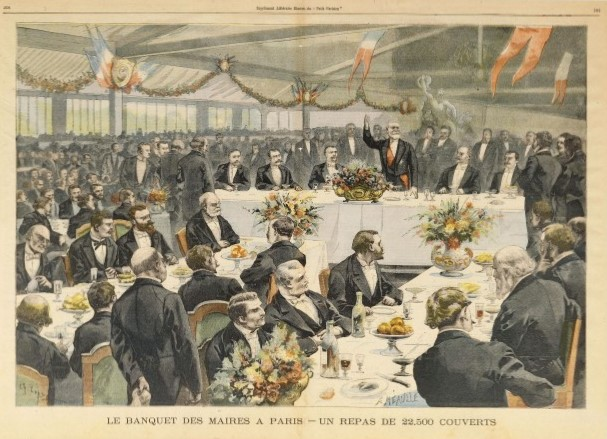
The Mayors' Banquet, 1900

== Selected works ==
- Messieurs et Mesdemoiselles Bébé, carnets d’un papa, Ducrocq, 1887
- Délaissée, A. Mame et fils, 1898
- Victor Hugo, 1802–1902, ouvrage pour la jeunesse, Société Française d'Éditions d'Art, 1902
