= 35 Iberian campaign in Armenia =

Iberian invasion of Armenia
- Part of the Roman–Parthian competition in Armenia
Date	35 AD
Location	Armenia
Result	Iberian victory

Belligerents
Kingdom of Iberia; Roman Empire	Kingdom of Armenia; Parthian Empire

Commanders and leaders
Pharasmanes I Mithridates	Arsaces I Orodes; Artabanus II

The Iberian invasion of Armenia in AD 35 was a campaign by Pharasmanes I, king of Iberia, to place his brother Mithridates on the Armenian throne. Supported by Roman Empire, Pharasmanes defeated Parthian forces led by Orodes, son of Artabanus II. The victory secured Mithridates as a Roman client king and briefly extended Iberian influence in the Caucasus.

== Background ==
By the early 1st century AD Armenia occupied a strategic position between Roman Empire and Parthian Empire; both great powers sought to influence who held the Armenian crown. Rome under Tiberius pursued a policy of appointing client kings acceptable to Roman interests. As recorded by Tacitus and later chroniclers, Pharasmanes I of Iberia became an important regional actor allied to Rome. In AD 35 the Romans supported installing Mithridates, a Pharnavazid prince and brother of Pharasmanes, as king of Armenia — a move that provoked Parthian resistance.

== Invasion ==
In 35 AD, with Roman approval, Pharasmanes I led an Iberian army, reinforced by Caucasian Albanian and Sarmatian auxiliaries, into Armenia. He advanced rapidly, captured the capital Artaxata, and expelled the Parthian prince Arsaces. In response, King Artabanus III sent his son Orodes with a Parthian army to confront the invaders. According to Tacitus, the two forces met in open battle, where Pharasmanes personally wounded Orodes, throwing the Parthians into disorder. The Iberian victory secured the throne for Mithridates, who was crowned king of Armenia under Roman protection.

== See also ==
- Iberian–Armenian War

== Bibliography ==
- Rayfield, Donald (2012). Edge of Empires, a History of Georgia. London: Reaktion Books. ISBN 978-1-78023-070-2.
- Grousset, René (1995) [1947]. Histoire de l'Arménie des origines à 1071 (in French). Payot. ISBN 2-228-88912-1.
