= Client kingdoms in ancient Rome =

Formally independent states, but subordinate to the Roman Empire

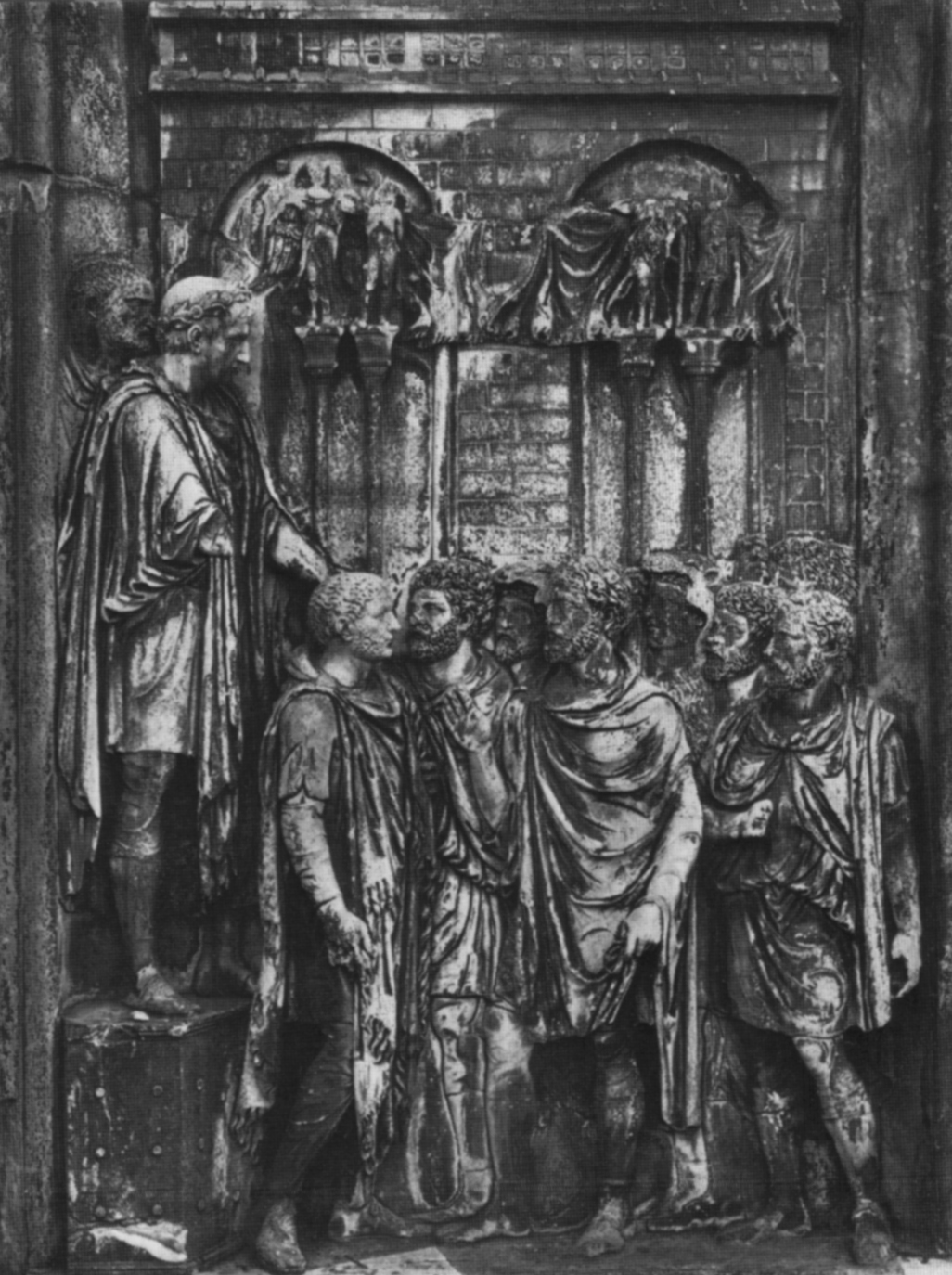
The Roman emperor, Marcus Aurelius, appoints as king of a "client" state and ally of Rome a barbarian loyal to him (among the Quadi), possibly Furtius, mentioned by Cassius Dio Cocceianus during the Marcomannic Wars (Arch of Constantine).

A client kingdom or people in ancient Rome meant a kingdom or ancient people that was in the condition of "appearing" still independent, but in the "sphere of influence" and thus dependence of the neighboring Roman Empire. It was a form of modern protectorate, where the kingdom or territory in question were controlled or occupied (under the guise of protection) by a stronger power.

== Political and military role ==
The Romans realized that the task of ruling and assimilating a large number of peoples at once was almost impossible, and that a plan of gradual annexation would be simpler, leaving the provisional organization in the hands of princes born and raised in the country of origin. Thus arose the figure of client kings, whose function was to promote the political and economic development of their kingdoms, fostering their civilization and economy. In this way, when kingdoms reached an acceptable level of development, they could be incorporated as new provinces or parts of them. The conditions of vassal-client status were, therefore, transitory in nature.

A "client king," recognized by the Roman Senate as amicus populi Romani, was usually nothing more than an instrument of control first in the hands of the Republic, and then of the Roman Empire. This concerned not only foreign and defensive policy, where the client king was entrusted with the task of assuming the burden of ensuring along his borders security against "low-intensity" infiltration and dangers, but also internal dynastic matters, within the imperial security system. Sometimes such serious unrest occurred in some of the "client kingdoms" that the very borders of adjacent provinces were threatened, so much so that it was necessary to intervene directly with Roman armies: for instance, during the Tacfarinas revolt in Africa, where it was necessary to send a second legion, the IX Hispana.

However, the kingdoms or client peoples could do little against "high-intensity" (as Edward Luttwak argues) dangers such as provincial-scale invasions. They could help by slowing the enemy advance with their own, limited forces, at least until the Roman ally arrived: in other words, they could provide some "geographic depth," but nothing more. Clearly, the damage caused by the invaders, before direct Roman intervention, could be extensive before they were repelled. For these reasons, in order to reduce such risks to an absolute minimum, it was deemed more appropriate in some cases to "encompass" these Kingdoms, building along their borders a linear defense system, manned by numerous Roman military posts and capable of repelling external enemy invasions immediately.

== History ==
=== Republican era ===
==== Second half of the 3rd century BC ====
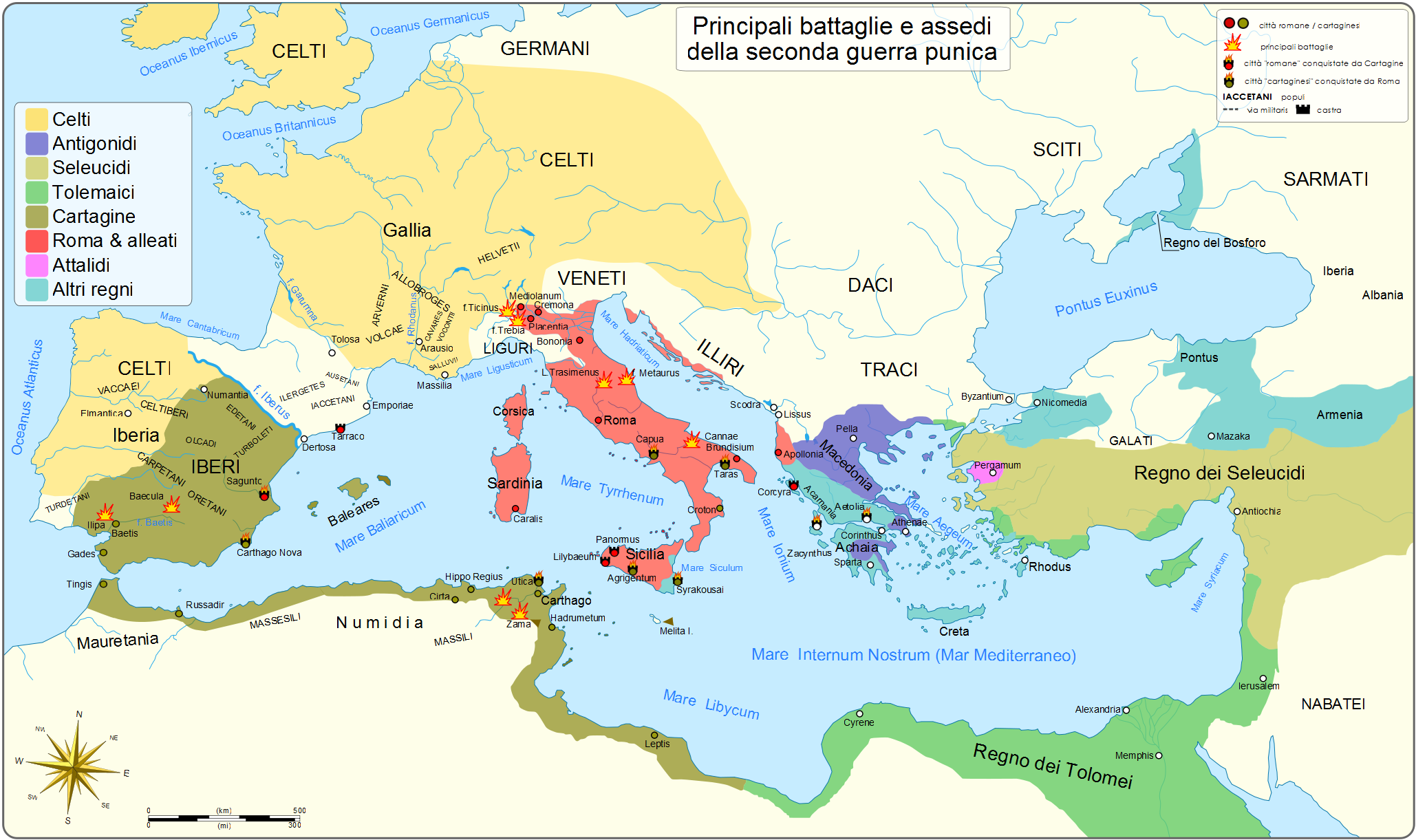
The Treaty of Ebro and the major battles of the Second Punic War

The ongoing conflict that had seen Massalia and the Carthaginians vying for the best markets in the western Mediterranean since the 6th century BC, put the Greek colony in the position of asking Rome for help (venire in fidem), around 236 BC, a decade before the Treaty of Ebro, concluded between Rome and Carthage. This would be the first example of "popolus cliens" of the Romans, outside Roman Italy.

A few years later (in 230 BC), some Greek colonies in the eastern Adriatic Sea (from Apollonia, to Kerkyra, Epidamnos and Issa), being attacked by the Illyrian pirates of Queen Teuta, also decided to come in fidem of Rome, asking for its direct military intervention. The Senate, after learning that one of the ambassadors sent to negotiate with the Illyrian queen had been killed under unclear circumstances (a certain Lucius Cornucanius), voted in favor of war (in 229 BC). The clashes were short-lived, for as early as 228 BC Queen Teuta was forced to sign the peace and leave present-day Albania, while Rome became to all intents and purposes the patron state of the cities of Apollonia, in Kerkyra, Epidamnos and Issa, as well as Oricus, Dimale and the "client" king Demetrius of Pharos. The subsequent Roman ambassadorship of Postumius to Aetolia, Achaea and Corinth allowed Rome to take part in the Isthmian Games of 228 BC, thus opening the doors of Hellenic civilization to the Romans.

During the Second Punic War, in the summer of 210 BC, the king of Numidia Syphax sent ambassadors to Rome to report the favorable outcome of the battles the king had fought against the Carthaginians. They assured the assembled Senate that their king was totally adverse toward Carthage, while in Rome he acknowledged his friendship. They recalled that in the past Syphax had sent ambassadors to Spain to the Roman generals Gnaeus and Publius Cornelius, and that now more than ever he wished to win the friendship of the Roman people by addressing the Senate itself. The Senate not only agreed to the request of the Numidian king, but sent to him as ambassadors Lucius Genucius, Publius Petelius, and Publius Popilius so that they could bring him gifts, including a purple toga and tunic, a curule seat of ivory, and a five-pound golden cup. The senate ambassadors were also instructed to go, soon after, to the other African kings, bringing them as gifts praetorian togas and golden cups weighing three pounds each. Marcus Atilius Regulus and Manius Acilius were sent as ambassadors, also in 210 B.C, to Alexandria, Egypt, to rulers Ptolemy IV and Cleopatra, to renew friendship with the Roman people. Gifts were also brought to them: to the king a toga, a purple tunic and an ivory curule seat; to the queen a rich embroidered robe together with a purple cloak.

==== 2nd century BC ====
The kingdom of Pergamon entered the Roman sphere of its allied states, especially following the Treaty of Apamea in 188 BC, after which it obtained numerous possessions and territorial expansions. Its increasing dependence on Rome resulted, following the death of its ruler, Attalus III (in 133 BC), in being bequeathed to the Roman Republic and consequently in the transformation of its territories into a Roman province.

At the end of the Third Macedonian War, with the Roman victory at Pydna, the kingdom of Macedon was divided into four districts (in 167 BC), resulting in all respects in a Roman protectorate, which a two decades later was transformed into the Roman province of Macedonia (in 146 BC).

A few years later, this time in the West, when the allied and "client" people of the Romans, the Taurisci, asked for help against a Germanic invasion of Cimbri and Teutons, nomadic peoples originally from Jutland and Scania, the Romans, under the command of Consul Gnaeus Papirius Carbo, were unable to stop the enemy advance, resulting in a defeat near Noreia (in 113 BC). The Germans continued to terrorize Rome for another decade, until Gaius Marius finally defeated them at Aquae Sextiae (in 102 BC) and the Campi Raudii (in 101 BC).

==== First quarter of the first century BC ====
In 96 BC. Ptolemy Apion, belonging to the Ptolemaic dynasty, was the last Hellenic ruler of Cyrenaica, a longtime ally of the Romans. Upon his death he decided to bequeath his kingdom to Rome. However, the new territories were not organized into a province until 74 BC with the arrival of the first legate of praetorian rank (legatus pro praetore), joined by a quaestor (quaestor pro praetore). It consisted of five cities, all of Greek origin, constituting the so-called Cyrenaic Pentapolis, namely: the capital Cyrene with its port of Apollonia (today Marsa Susa), Teuchira-Arsinoe, Euesperides-Berenice (Benghazi) and Barce-Ptolemais (Al Marj).

==== In the time of Pompey and Caesar (70 - 44 BC) ====
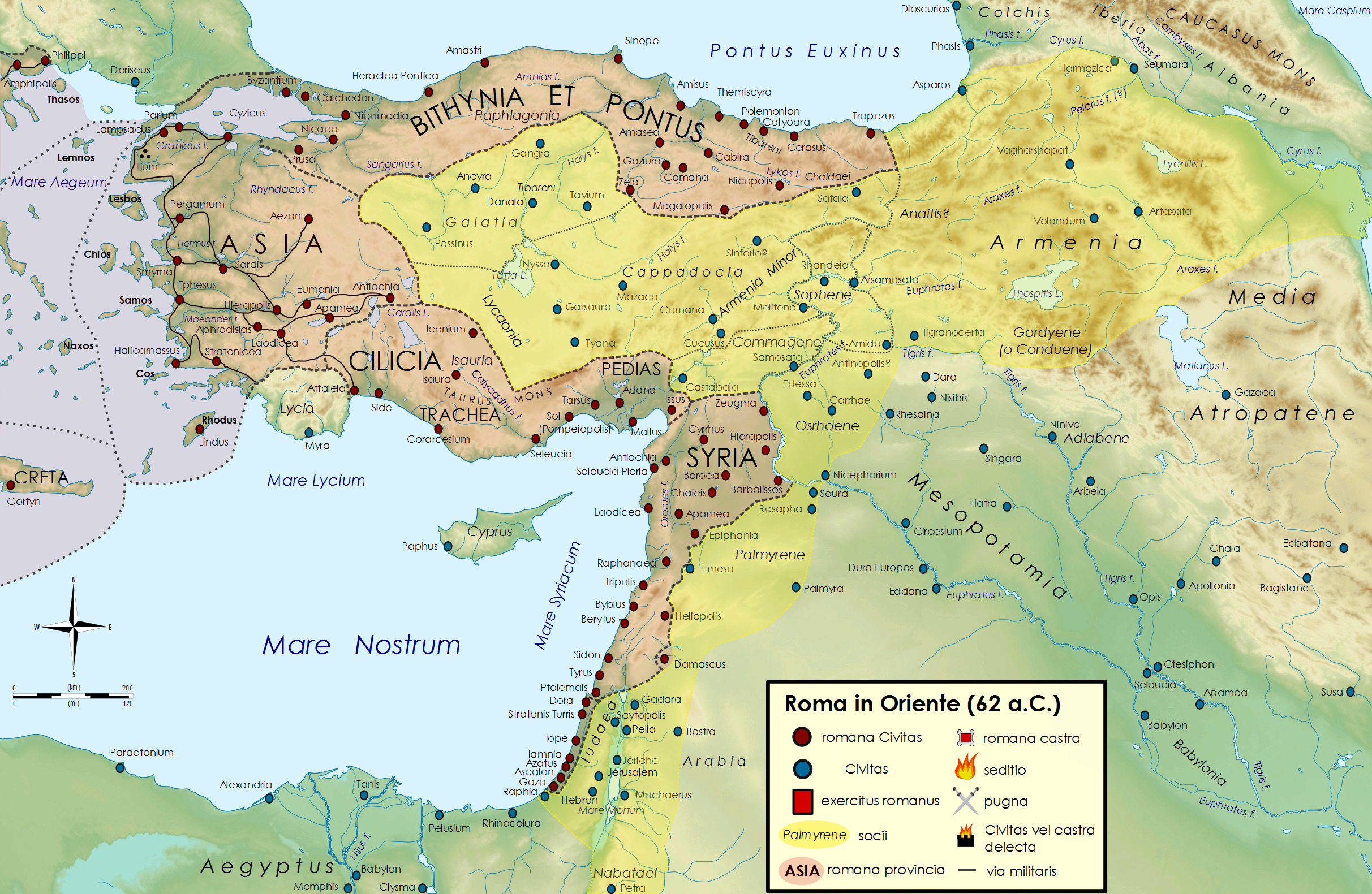
The eastern Roman dominions (in pink) and client kingdoms (in yellow), allied with Rome in 63 BC, at the end of Pompey's Mithridatic Wars.

During its heyday, from 95 BC to 66 BC, the kingdom of Armenia had control over parts of the Caucasus, present-day eastern Turkey, Lebanon and Syria. It came under the sphere of influence of the Romans in 66 BC, with the campaigns of Lucullus and Pompey. Because of this, the kingdom of Armenia was the scene of contention between Rome and the Parthian Empire. The Parthians forced the kingdom of Armenia into submission from 47 BC to 37 BC, when Rome lost control of the kingdom only briefly.

In 63 BC with the end of the Third Mithridatic War, Pompey reorganized the entire Roman East and the alliances that gravitated around it. To Tigranes II he left Armenia; to Pharnaces the Bosporus; to Ariobarzanes Cappadocia and some neighboring territories; to Antiochus of Commagene he added Seleucia and parts of Mesopotamia that he had conquered; to Deiotarus, tetrarch of Galatia, he added the territories of Armenia Minor bordering Cappadocia; he made Attalus the prince of Paphlagonia and Aristarchus that of Colchis; he appointed Archelaus priest of the goddess worshipped at Comana; and finally he made Castor of Phanagoria a faithful ally and friend of the Roman people.

The Nabataean Kingdom of Arabia Petraea in 62 BC was forced to ask for peace from Marcus Aemilius Scaurus, who in order to lift the siege of the capital, Petra, accepted a payment of 300 talents. Having obtained peace, the Nabataean king Aretas retained his domains in full, including Damascus, but became a vassal of Rome.

On the western front, during 58 BC, the Gallic people of the Aedui (amicus populi romani) had sent ambassadors to Rome to ask for help against their inconvenient Germanic neighbor. The Senate decided to intervene and persuaded Ariovistus to suspend his conquests in Gaul; in return it offered him, at the suggestion of Caesar (who was consul in 59 BC), the title of rex atque amicus populi Romani ("king and friend of the Roman people"). Ariovistus, however, continued to harass the neighboring Gauls with increasing cruelty and haughtiness, so much so that they asked Caesar for military aid, who was the only one who could prevent Ariovistus from having an even greater amount of Germans cross the Rhine, and above all could defend all of Gaul from the Germanic king's bullying.

Caesar believed that it would be dangerous in the future to continue to allow the Germans to cross the Rhine and enter Gaul in large numbers. He feared that once all of Gaul was occupied, the Germans might invade the Narbonese province and then Italy itself, as had happened in the past with the invasion of Cimbri and Teutons. For these reasons, after an initial period of negotiations, he was forced to face them in battle and beat them, expelling them permanently from the territories of Gaul. This was not the only episode of "patronage" in Gaul at the time of its conquest (58-50 BC).

The beginnings of the Roman "patronage" system in Britain occurred with Caesar, who, having first landed on the island in 55 BC, put Mandubracius back on the throne of the Trinovantes after he had been ousted by Cassivellaunus. This gesture earned the proconsul help during the second Caesarian invasion of the island the following year (54 BC). This system was developed over the next hundred years, starting with Augustus, but especially following the Roman conquest of Britain, desired in 43 AD by Emperor Claudius.

==== At the time of Antony and Octavian (44-31 BC) ====
Mark Antony and Cleopatra: denarius
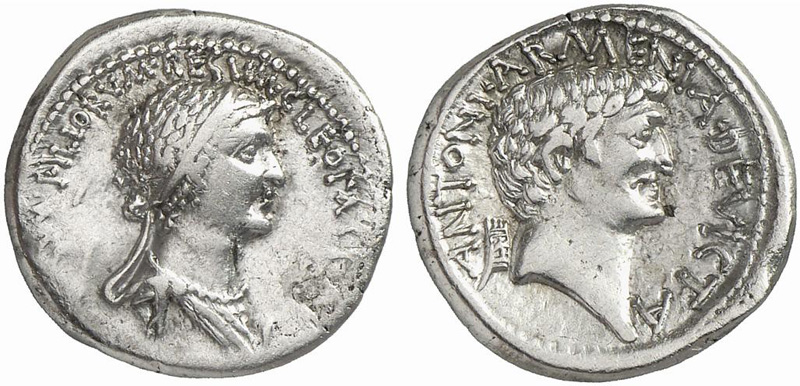
First side of the image: CLEOPATRAE REGINAE REGVM FILIORVM REGVM, head with diadem to the right.
Second side of the image: ANTONI ARMENIA DEVICTA, head to the right and in the background an Armenian tiara.
21 mm, 3.45 g, coined in 32 BC

Mark Antony's campaigns in Parthia were unsuccessful. Not only had Rome's honor not been vindicated following the defeat suffered by Consul Marcus Licinius Crassus at Carrhae in 53 BC, but also the Roman armies had been beaten back into enemy territory, and Armenia had entered the Roman sphere of influence only briefly.

What remained was a whole series of client kingdoms loyal to Rome, among them that of Archelaus of Cappadocia (since 36 BC), who, once appointed king of Cappadocia by Mark Antony, in order to replace Ariarathes X of Cappadocia, the last representative of the royal family, as a token of his gratitude, provided troops to Antony for his expeditions against the Parthians.

In 38 BC the Ubii people, allied with the Romans since the time of Gaius Julius Caesar's conquest of Gaul, were in this case transferred by Marcus Vipsanius Agrippa to Roman territory and incorporated within the Gallic provinces. It was intended to protect them from the neighboring Germanic peoples across the Rhine, hostile to them as amicus populi romani, Usipetes and Tencteri.

=== Early Roman Empire ===
==== Augustus (30 BC-AD 14) ====
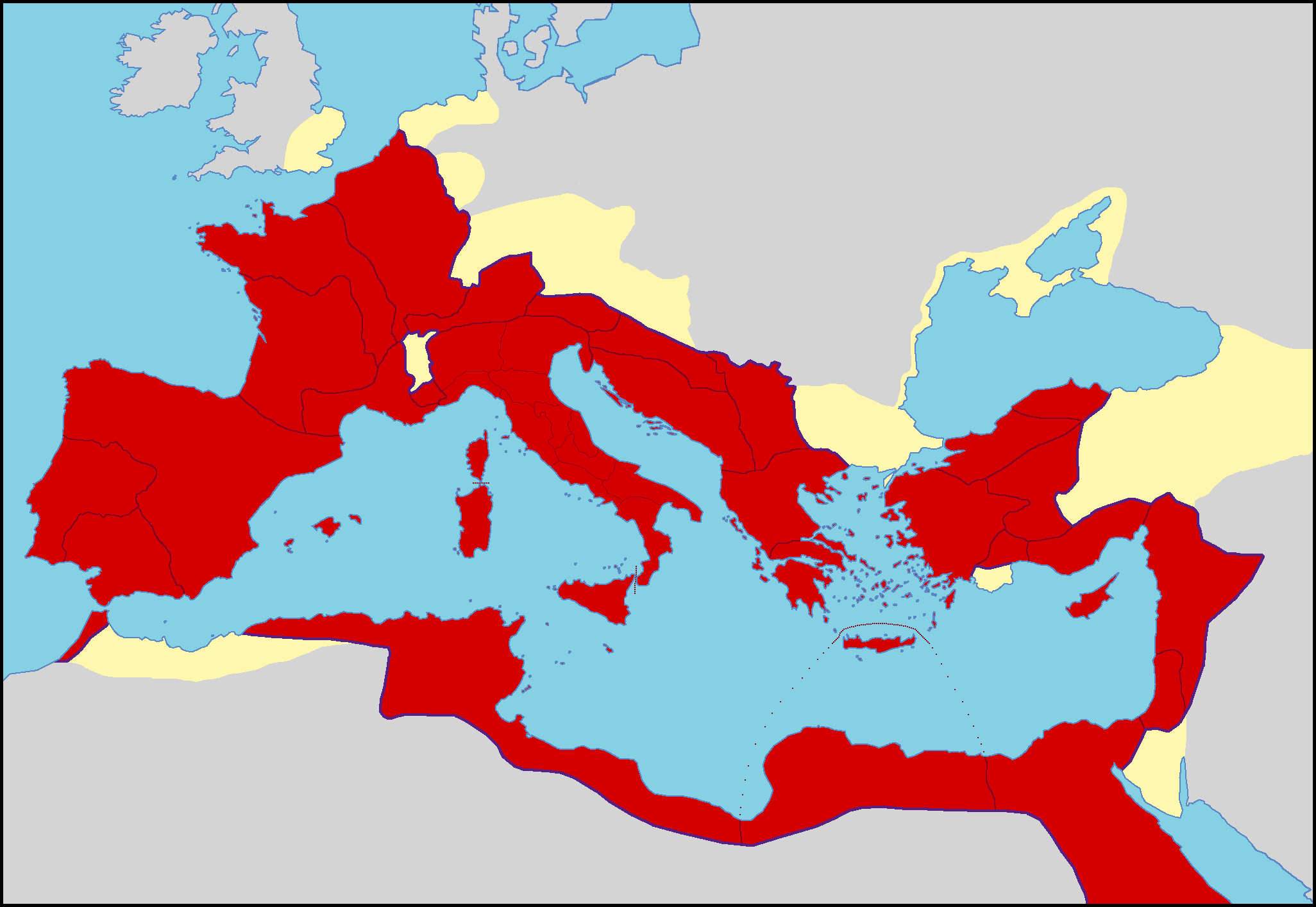
In the present map, which defines the imperial situation at the death of Augustus (14), the "client" kingdoms (in yellow), outside the imperial borders, are shown, while in red are the territories under imperial sovereignty. Among the many client kingdoms are the eastern one of Cappadocia, the kingdom of Mauretania, up to those along the European borders of Thrace and northern Noricum, or even across the Danube, of Maroboduus (Quadi and Marcomanni).

[...] The friendly and allied kings founded cities under the name of Caesarea, each in his own kingdom, and all together decided to complete, at their own expense, the temple of Jupiter Olympius in Athens, begun some centuries before, dedicating it to the Genius of Augustus. Leaving their kingdoms, they came daily to pay homage to him, not only in Rome, but also during his travels in the provinces, often wearing only the toga, without the royal insignia, as mere clients.

— Suetonius, Augustus, 60).

The Roman Emperor Augustus continued on the path that his republican predecessors had laid out, leaving under the command of certain client kings specific regions that were not yet considered ready for annexation as provinces. The Romans, already in the past, had realized that the task of directly governing and civilizing certain populations would prove very difficult, and certainly easier if entrusted to local princes. Augustus, after seizing by right of war (belli iure) many kingdoms, almost always returned them to the same rulers from whom he had taken them or assigned them to foreign princes. He also succeeded in uniting allied kings to the empire through kinship ties. He cared for these kingdoms as if they were part of the imperial provincial system, going so far as to assign an adviser to princes who were too young or inexperienced, waiting for them to grow and mature; raising and educating the sons of many kings so that many of them would return to their territories to rule as allies of the Roman people.

The function of the client kings was to promote a continuous exchange of interests between the empire and their people, both in political-military terms (including providing armed men during the Roman ally's military campaigns) and in economic terms with increasingly frequent exchanges and growing cultural development. When this development had reached a satisfactory level, their kingdoms were ready to be annexed as provinces or parts thereof.

Such a political design was applied in the West to the Cottian Alps (entrusted to Cottius, an indigenous prince, and his son, Cottius II, until 63 when they became part of the Roman Empire) to the Maroboduus kingdom of the Quadi and Marcomanni (as early as 6), of Noricum, Thrace (where continued Roman interventions were essential to save the weak Odrysian dynasty) and Mauretania (entrusted by the Romans to the king, Juba II, and his wife, Cleopatra Selene II); in the East to the Kingdom of Armenia, Judaea (which retained a degree of autonomy as a client kingdom between 63 BC and 6 AD and again under Herod Agrippa), Cappadocia, and the Cimmerian Bosporus. These client kings were allowed full freedom in their internal administration, and were probably required to pay regular tribute, or they had to provide allied troops as needed (which was imposed on barbarian clients, as in the case of the Batavi), as well as agreeing in advance on their foreign policy with the emperor.

West of the Euphrates, Augustus attempted to reorganize the Roman East by directly increasing the territories administered by Rome. He incorporated some vassal states, turning them into provinces, such as Amyntas' Galatia in 25 BC, or Herod Archelaus' Judaea in 6 (after there had been some initial unrest in 4 BC upon the death of Herod the Great); he strengthened old alliances with Herod's descendants, with local kings who had become "client kings of Rome," as happened to Archelaus, king of Cappadocia, Asander, king of the Bosporan Kingdom, and Polemon I, king of Pontus, in addition to the rulers of Hemisa, Iturea, Commagene, Cilicia, Chalcis, Nabataea, Iberia, Colchis, and Albania.

Augustus: denarius
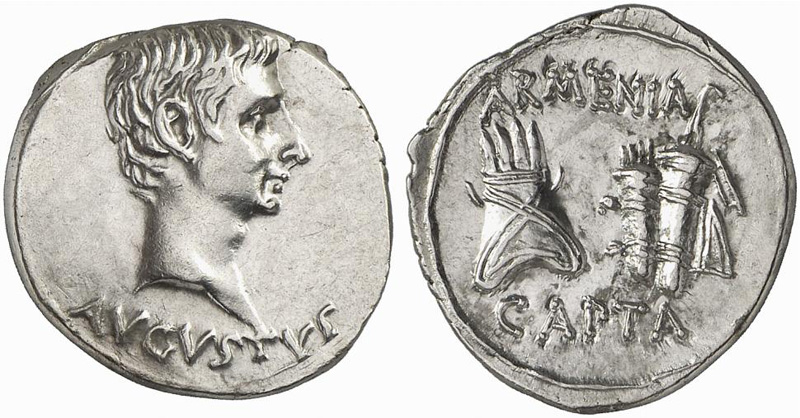
First side of the image: AUGUSTUS, head of Augustus toward the right;
Second side of the image: ARMENIA CAPTA, an Armenian tiara, a bow and a quiver with arrows.
Silver, 3.77 g; minted in 19-18 BC, after Armenia returned to the area of Roman influence.

In contrast, east of the Euphrates, Augustus' goal was to achieve the greatest political interference without intervening with costly military action. The crux of the matter was the kingdom of Armenia, which, because of its geographical location, had been an object of contention between Rome and Parthia for the past 50 years. He aimed to make it a Roman "buffer-client state," with the installation of a king agreeable to Rome, and if necessary imposed by force of arms.

In this case, in the winter of 21-20 BC, Augustus ordered the 21-year-old Tiberius to move east, toward Armenia. It was a region of fundamental importance for the political balance of the entire eastern area: it played a buffer role between the Roman empire in the west and that of the Parthians in the east, and both wanted to make it their own vassal state, which would ensure the protection of their borders from their enemies.

The Parthians, frightened by the advance of the Roman legions, compromised and signed a peace with Augustus, who had meanwhile arrived in the east from Samos, returning the insignia and prisoners they had taken possession of after their victory over Marcus Licinius Crassus at the Battle of Carrhae in 53 BC. Upon his arrival, therefore, Tiberius had merely proceeded to crown Tigranes, who took the name Tigranes III, as client king in a peaceful and solemn ceremony held before the eyes of the Roman legions, while Augustus was proclaimed imperator for the ninth time, and announced in the senate the vassalage of Armenia without, however, decreeing its annexation, so much so that he wrote in his Res gestae divi Augusti:

Armeniam maiorum, interfecto rege eius Artaxe, c[u]m possem facere provinciam, malui maiorum nostrorum exemplo regn[u]m id Tigrani, regis Artavasdis filio, nepoti autem Tigranis regis, per T[i. Ne]ronem trad[er]e, qui tum mihi priv[ig]nus erat.
Although I could make Greater Armenia a province after the murder of its king Artaxias, I preferred, following the example of our ancestors, to entrust that kingdom to Tigranes, the son of King Artavasdes and grandson of King Tigranes, through Tiberius Nero, who was then my stepson.

— Augustus, Res gestae divi Augusti, 27.

==== Tiberius (14-37) ====
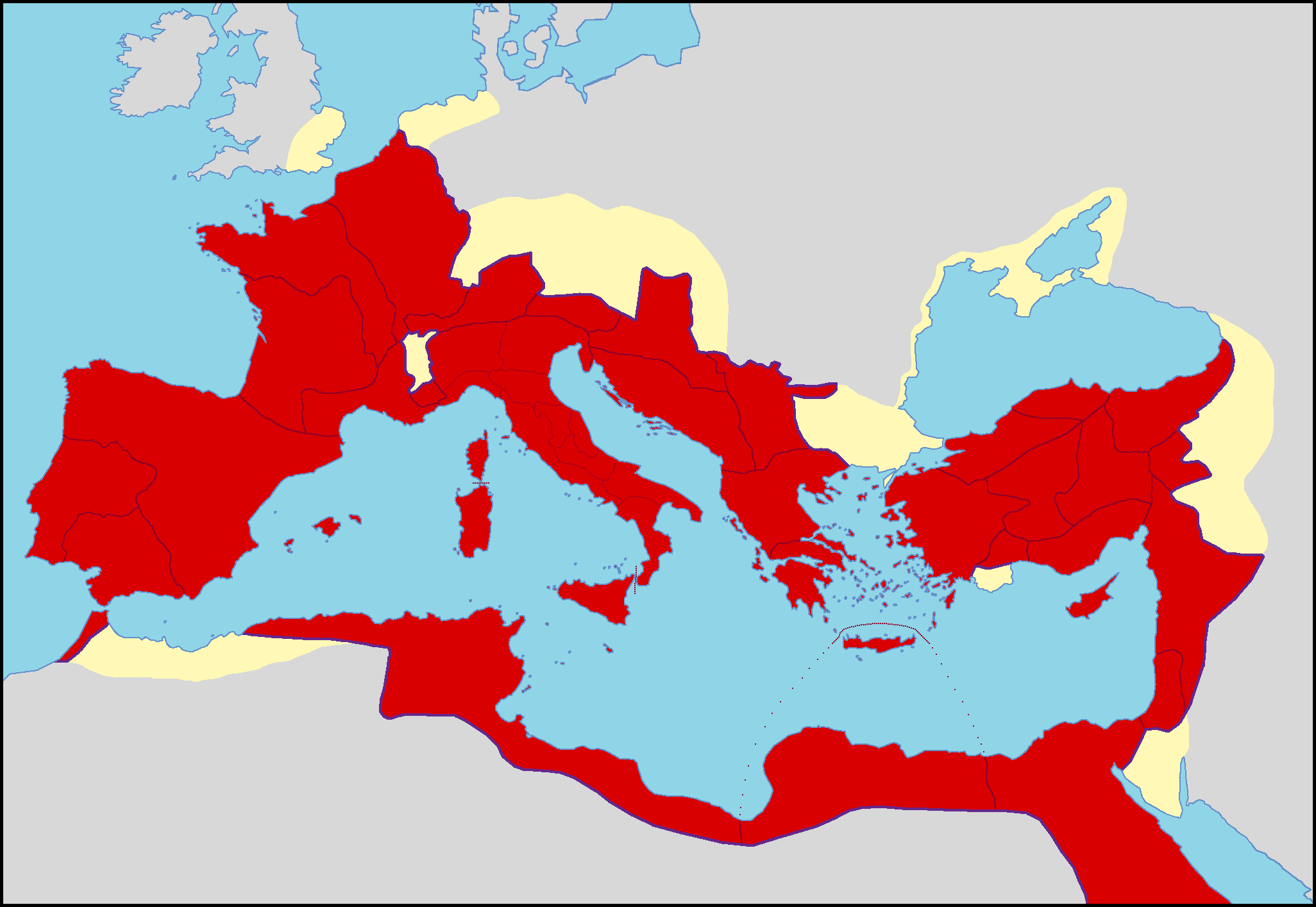
"Client" kingdoms at the death of Tiberius (in 37), where outside the imperial borders (in red), those "vassal" to Rome (in yellow) are indicated. These were, for example, the kingdom of Mauretania, Thrace and Noricum, and beyond the Danube of Maroboduus (Quadi and Marcomanni).

In the West, at the end of three years of military campaigns in Germania Magna (14 to 16), Germanicus had succeeded in gaining the alliance of numerous Germanic peoples north of the Danube and east of the Rhine, who had now become "clients" (such as the Angrivarii), after the campaign of 16, or the Batavi, Frisii and Chauci along the North Sea coast, at least until the time of Claudius. Finally, Tiberius decided to suspend all military activity across the Rhine, leaving it to the Germanic peoples themselves to cope, fighting each other. He only made alliances with some peoples against others (ex. the Quadi and Marcomanni of Maroboduus, against the Cherusci of Arminius); the Iazigi Sarmatians (to whom he gave permission to interpose themselves in the Tisza plain, between the borders of the new province of Pannonia and the fearsome Dacians, around 20), so as to keep them always at war with each other; avoiding having to intervene directly, with great risk of incurring new disasters such as that of Varus; but above all, without having to employ huge military and economic resources, to keep the peace within the "possible and new" imperial borders.

In the East, on the other hand, the political situation, after a period of relative tranquility following the agreements between Augustus and the Parthian rulers, became contentious again. The new ruler, alien to local traditions, turned out to be hated by the Parthians. Defeated and driven out by Artabanus II, he was forced to take refuge in Armenia. There the kings imposed on the throne by Rome were dead, and Vonon was thus chosen as the new ruler; however, soon Artabanus pressured Rome to dismiss the new Armenian king, and the emperor, to avoid having to wage a new war against the Parthians, had the Roman governor of Syria arrest Vonones.

Also disturbing the eastern situation were the deaths of the Cappadocian king Archelaus, who had come to Rome to pay homage to Tiberius, of Antiochus III, king of Commagene, and of Philopator, king of Cilicia: the three states, which were "vassals" of Rome, were in a situation of political instability, and the contrasts between the pro-Roman party and the advocates of autonomy were sharpening.

The difficult situation in the East necessitated Roman intervention, and in 18 Tiberius sent his adopted son, Germanicus, who was appointed consul and awarded the imperium proconsolaris maius over all the eastern provinces, accompanied by the new governor of Syria, Gnaeus Calpurnius Piso. Arriving in the East, Germanicus, with the consent of the Parthians, crowned a new ruler of Armenia at Artashat: the kingdom had been left without a leader after the deposition of Vonon, and Germanicus conferred the office of king upon the young Zeno, son of Rome's "client" ruler of Pontus Polemon I.

He also stipulated that Commagene should fall under the jurisdiction of a praetor while retaining its formal autonomy, that Cappadocia should be established as a province in its own right, and that Cilicia should instead become part of the province of Syria. Finally, Germanicus renewed his friendship with the Parthians.

The arrangement of the East prepared by Germanicus ensured peace until 34: in that year King Artabanus II of Parthia, convinced that Tiberius, now an old man, would not resist from Capri, placed his son Arshak on the throne of Armenia after Artaxias' death. However, Tiberius decided to send Tiridates, a descendant of the Arsacid dynasty held as a hostage in Rome, to contest the Parthian throne with Artabanus, and supported the installation of Mithridates, brother of the king of Iberia, on the throne of Armenia. Mithridates, with the help of his brother Pharasmanes, succeeded in seizing the throne of Armenia, defeating the Parthians of Orodes, son of Artabanus. The latter, fearing a new massive intervention by the Romans, refused to send any more troops against Mithridates, and abandoned his claims to the kingdom of Armenia. However, a short time later, when Tiridates had been on the throne for about a year, Artabanus, gathering a large army, marched against him. The frightened Arsacid sent from Rome was forced to retreat, and Tiberius had to accept that the Parthian state would continue to be ruled by a ruler hostile to the Romans.

==== Claudius (41-54) ====
Claudius: Didrachm
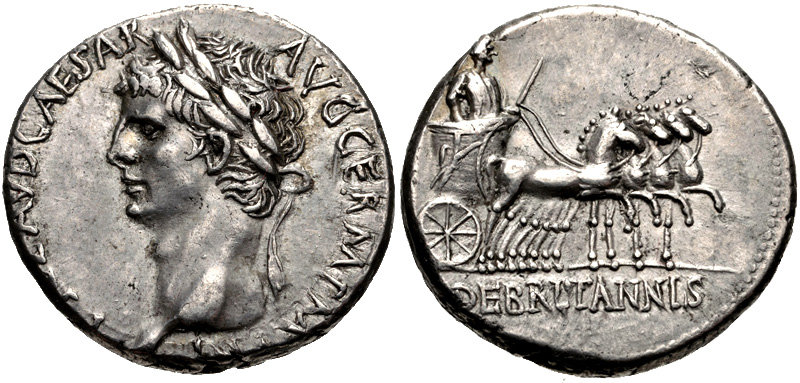
First side of the image: TI CLAVD CAESAR AVG GERM P M TR P, laureate head to left.
Second side of the image: Claudius leading a triumphal quadriga to the right, holding reins and a scepter; DE BRITANNIS inscribed below.
21 mm, 7.48 g, coined in 43-48.

Emperor Caligula, following the death of Juba II's son Ptolemy (in 40) arranged for the "client" kingdom of Mauretania to come under the direct control of Rome. His successor was left with the task of pacifying the area. Claudius, in 42, after quelling a revolt of the local Berber tribes, created two new provinces: Mauretania Caesariensis (with capital Iol-Caesarea, today Cherchell) and Mauretania Tingitana (with capital first, probably Volubilis and then Tingis, today Tangier), although some indigenous principalities still retained de facto independence in the mountainous interior regions. Meanwhile in the East Judaea was given independence again in 41 by Caligula and then taken away by Claudius in 44.

Upon the death of Rhoemetalces III, the kingdom of Thrace again became divided. Concerned by the continuing conflict, after Tiberius had already been forced to intervene in the past to quell continuing unrest among the Thracian peoples (17-19), allies and "clients" of Rome at least since the time of Augustus, Claudius decided to annex the region and established the new province of Thrace (46).

Following the first phase of the conquest of Britain, the Iceni people (starting in 47), obtained semi-independence from Rome, knowing the latter that upon the death of their king, Prasutagus, these territories would be incorporated into those of the neighboring Roman province. However, the king arranged things differently. He resolved that at least part of his domains should remain with his daughters and his wife Boudica, who led a revolt against the Romans shortly thereafter, which was suppressed by the Roman legions, at the end of which her territories came under Roman rule.

==== Nero (54-68) ====
Corbulo's military campaigns of 61-63 against Armenians and Parthians.

Under Nero, between 58 and 63, the Romans waged a new campaign against the Parthian Empire, which had once again invaded Armenia. After retaking the kingdom in 60 and losing it again in 62, the Romans sent Gnaeus Domitius Corbulo in 63 to the territories of Vologases I of Parthia, who succeeded in restoring Armenia to client status, which remained there until the following century, when Trajan undertook a new series of military campaigns against the Parthians (in 114).

At the same time in the West, in Britain, with the death of the "client" king of the Iceni, Prasutagus, Rome aspired to encompass his kingdom, but the king, dying, left his domains to his family members, appointing the Roman emperor, Nero, as co-heir. It was customary for Rome to grant independence to allied kingdoms, only as long as their rulers or male children were alive. Thus, when Prasutagus died, the kingdom was annexed by the Romans, as if it had been conquered. Queen Boudica protested strongly, but the Romans humiliated her by exposing her naked in public, whipping her, while her young daughters were raped. The reaction of the Iceni people was not long in coming, and in 60 or 61, while the Roman proconsul Gaius Suetonius Paulinus was waging a campaign against the Druids of the Isle of Anglesey, Iceni and Trinovantes rebelled under the leadership of Boudica. It took a long year of hard and bloody fighting before the former Prasutagus' kingdom was finally annexed.

==== Vespasian (69-79) ====
In the years around 72-74 he reorganized the eastern part of the Roman Empire, reducing Achaia, Lycia, Rhodes, Byzantium, and Samos to provinces, taking away their freedom; he did the same with Cilicia Trachea and Commagene (in 72), which until then had been ruled by kings.

==== Domitian (81-96) ====
Trajan: Denarius
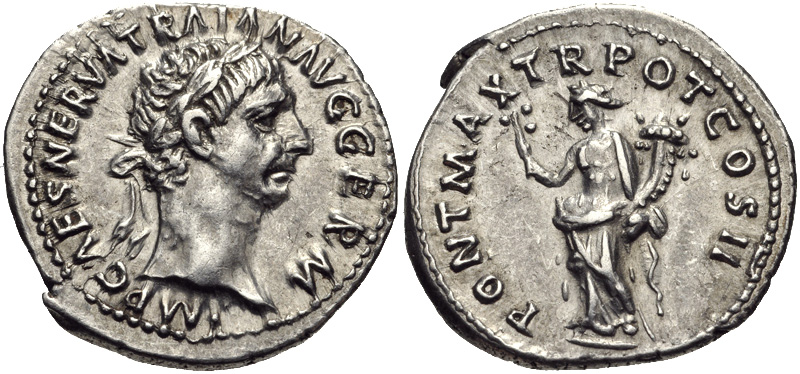
First side of the image: IMP CAES Nerva TRAIAN AUG GERM, laureate head to right.
Second side of the image: PONT MAX TR P COS II, Peace holds an olive branch and a cornucopia.
19 mm, 3.40 g, coined in 98 (at the end of the third and final phase of the Suebo-Sarmatian War).
Trajan: Aureus
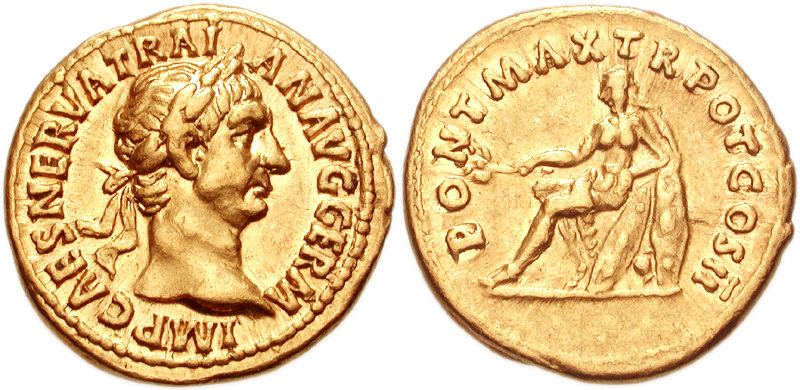
First side of the image: IMP CAES Nerva TRAI-AN AVG GERM, laureate head to right with drapery on shoulder.
Second side of the image: PONT MAX TR P COS II, Germany nude, seated toward the left on an oblong shield, holding an olive branch in her right hand, her left arm resting on the shield; below her are shields and helmets.
19 mm, 7.74 gr, 6 h (Temple of Juno Moneta); minted in Feb-Oct 98 (at the end of the third and final phase of the Suebo-Sarmatian War).

The "client" peoples of Marcomanni and Quadi (allies of Rome since the time of Maroboduus and Tiberius in 6), having failed to send the military aid required by Domitian for the Roman armies to fight the war against the Dacians of Decebalus, provoked the wrath of the ruler, who unleashed a war that lasted almost a decade (from 89 to 97), at the end of which the ancient amicitia populi romani and Germanic subservience to Rome was renewed, as the triumphal arch of Benevento testifies.

The expedition against the Suebian peoples was a strategic mistake, since Domitian had to abandon the Dacian front, in a very favorable situation after his recent victory at Tapae over Decebalus (of 88), and settle for a peace unfavorable to Rome, which forced the Roman Empire to postpone its conquest to a future date. The Roman armies were, therefore, withdrawn from Dacia, and the stipulation of a peace treaty led Decebalus to become a "client king," albeit only nominally, earning Roman gratitude and aid by sending expert carpenters, engineers, and an annual subsidy. His brother Degis was sent to Rome to receive from the hands of Domitian the crown to be given to the Dacian king as a sign of alliance and submission.

The Suebo-Sarmatian war could also be interpreted as a preemptive attack by the emperor against these peoples, who were preparing for an invasion of the territories of the neighboring and wealthy Roman province of Pannonia. In the course of these Suebo-Sarmatian wars, in an attempt to isolate the enemy tribes north of the Danubian limes, he also sought alliances in the northern neighbors of the Lugii and Semnones.

Masyas, king of the Semnones, and Ganna (who was a virgin priestess who had succeeded Veleda in Germania), presented themselves to Domitian, and after receiving honors from the emperor, they departed.

— Suetonius, The Twelve Caesars, Domitian, 5, 3

==== Trajan (98-117) ====
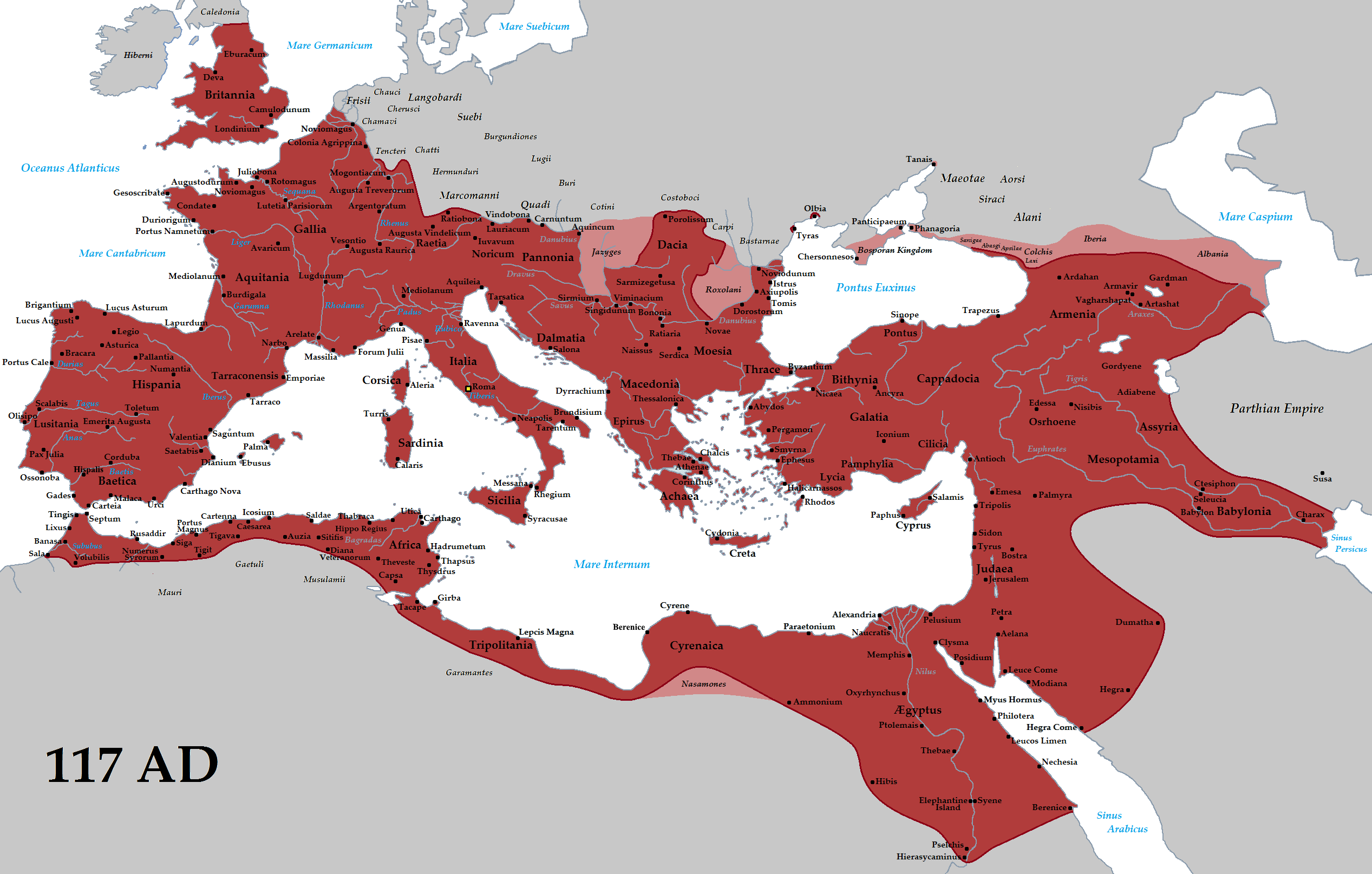
"Client" kingdoms during the principate of Trajan (in 116), where outside the imperial borders (in red), those "vassals" of Rome (in pink) are indicated. These were, for example, the kingdoms of the Sarmatian Iazyges and Roxolani, to the west and east of the Roman province of Dacia.

In the course of Trajan's conquest of Dacia in 101-106, the Roman emperor succeeded in obtaining military aid from the ancient Sarmatian ally, the Iazyges (who had just been brought back to obedience after a decade of new wars waged against them and their allies, the Suebi) against the Dacian king, Decebalus, who had disregarded the covenants of amicitia and "clientele" toward Rome made during the time of Domitian (in 89). The latter, after two bloody wars, was finally defeated and Dacia was annexed and made a Roman province.

As allies of the Romans, the Nabataeans also played the role of bulwark between Rome and the Bedouin peoples, who were disinclined to bow to the empire, nevertheless forwarding their wares to the northern emporiums and often supplying them with goods that came from those areas. They continued to prosper throughout the first and early second centuries, when Trajan incorporated their territories in 105/106, abolishing their cultural and national identity, into the new Roman province of Arabia Petraea. Their power had now extended well into Arabia, along the Red Sea to Yemen, and Petra remained a cosmopolitan emporium, despite the fact that its trade declined as the eastern trade routes, from Myos Hormos to Qift along the Nile, became established.

Trajan: Æ sestertius
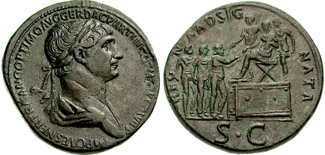
First side of the image: IMP CAES NER TRAIAN OPTIMAVG GER DAC PARTHICO P M TR P COS VI P P, laureate head to right.
Second side of the image: REGNA ADSIGNATA, S C in exergue; Trajan, in military uniform, seated on a curule seat, extends his hand to three barbarian kings, the first of whom in turn extends his hand to Trajan; two military officers behind the emperor, one holding a baton and a scepter.
27.01 gr, coined in 116.
Traiano: Æ sestertius
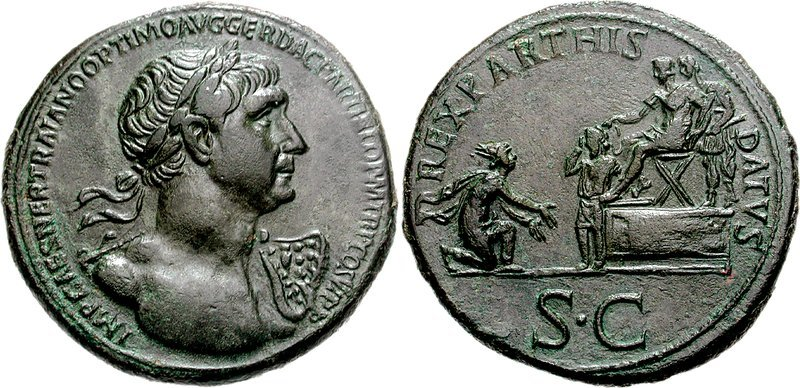
First side of the image: IMP CAES NER TRAIAN OPTIMAVG GER DAC PARTHICO P M TR P COS VI P P, laureate head to right;
Second side of the image: REX PARTHIS DATVS, S C in exergue; Trajan, in military uniform, seated on a curule seat, extends his hand to Parthamaspates, king of Parthia; behind Trajan a Roman officer to his left.
26.60 gr, 6h; coined in 116/117.

A few years later it was the turn of the kingdom of Armenia ("client" of Rome or Parthia in alternating stages), to be incorporated and made a Roman province in 114. It is known that Trajan, having reached Antioch in January of this year, gathered his legions and his best generals, including Lusius Quietus and Quintus Marcius Turbo (then praefectus classis Misenis), marched on Armenia and conquered its capital Artaxata. Deposing his king, a certain Parthamasiris, he annexed its territories to the Roman Empire. His armies continued from the north to Media in the east, and into northern Mesopotamia the following year.

In 116 Trajan, aware of the growing difficulties of the conquest, thought he had to give up the southern territories of Mesopotamia, making them his "client" kingdom, while placing on the throne a king loyal to him: the young Parthamaspates, crowned by the Roman emperor himself at Ctesiphon. He also eventually distributed to other rulers territories to the north and east of the new province of Armenia.

==== Hadrian (117-138) ====
Hadrian, newly installed on the throne, was forced to fight a new Sarmatian war in the years 117-119, first against the Roxolani of Moldova and Wallachia, and then against the Iazyges of the Tisza River valley (which was followed by the Roman abandonment of western Banat). At the end of these wars both populations entered the ranks of Rome's "client" populations.

The Suebian peoples of Quadi and Marcomanni, who had returned to the old Roman alliance since 97 (from the time of the last phase of Domitian's Suebo-Sarmatian war), awakened around 135, so much so that Emperor Hadrian was forced to send along the Pannonian front his designated heir, Aelius Caesar, to fight them in the course of two campaigns (of the years 136-137), in which it is known from the Historia Augusta that he achieved good successes against them, as the coinage of that period would also show, forcing them back to their former status as "client" populations.

==== Antoninus Pius (138-161) ====
Antoninus Pius: sestertius
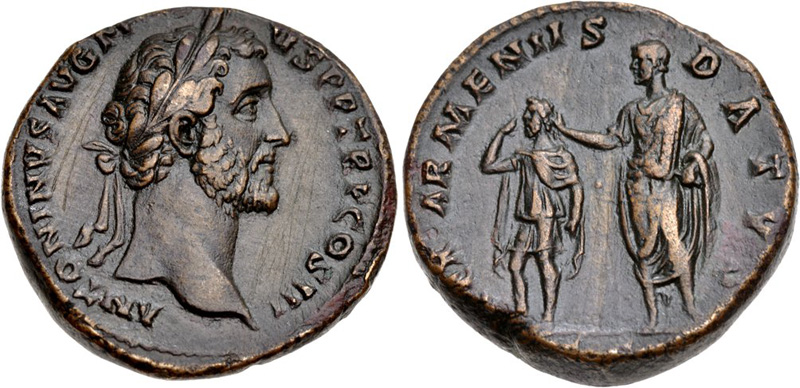
First side of the image: ANTONINUS AVG PI US P P TR P COS III, laureate head to right
Second side of the image: REX ARMENIIS DATVS, Antoninus Pius standing on the right holding a crown over the head of the King of Armenia (on the left).
30 mm, 26,62 g, coined in 141/143.
Antoninus Pius: Sestertius
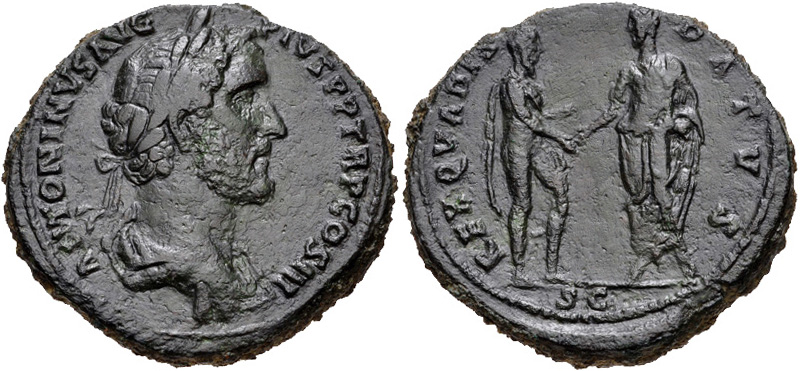
First side of the image: ANTONINUS AUG PIUS PP TRP COS III, laureate head toward right with drapery;
Second side of the image: REX QVADIS DATVS, Antoninus Pius standing left, gives a diadem to the king of the Quadi facing him on the right;S C in exergue.
33 mm, 24.36 gr, 12 h, coined in 143

The Historia Augusta relates what the relations Antoninus Pius had with the many "client" kingdoms of the period were like:

"Antoninus was visited in Rome by Pharasmanes [king of the Iberians, a Transcaucasian population], who was more deferential toward him than he had been toward Hadrian. He appointed Pacorus king of the Lazi [a population settled on the southeastern shore of the Black Sea], succeeded with a simple letter in diverting the Parthian king, Vologases III, from invading Armenia, and his authority was enough to recall King Abgar [king of Osroene in Mesopotamia] from the East. He also placed the pro-Roman king Sohaemus on the throne of Armenia. He was also an arbiter in disputes between the various rulers. He flatly refused to return to the king of the Parthians the royal throne that had been taken as part of the spoils by Trajan, gave the government of the Bosphorus back to Rhoemetalces [King of the Cimmerian Bosporus, present-day Crimea, from 131 to 153], resolving the pendencies the latter had with Eupator, sent reinforcements into Pontus to the Olbiopolites [inhabitants of Olbia or Olbiopolis, an ancient Greek colony that stood near the mouths of the Dnieper and Bug rivers on the Black Sea] who were fighting against the Tauroscites, and defeated the latter, even forcing them to give hostages. His prestige among foreign peoples, in short, was unprecedented, mainly by virtue of the fact that he always loved peace, so much so that he often repeated Scipio's saying, "I would rather save one citizen than kill a thousand enemies."

— Historia Augusta, Life of Antoninus Pius, IX.

He finally placed a new pro-Roman king on the throne of the neighboring "client" people of the Quadi, north of Upper and Lower Pannonia, after a new series of military campaigns led by a certain Titus Haterius Nepos, who was awarded ornamenta triumphalia for these new successes, so much so that around 142, a new coin was issued celebrating "Rex Quadi datus."

==== Marcus Aurelius (161-180) ====
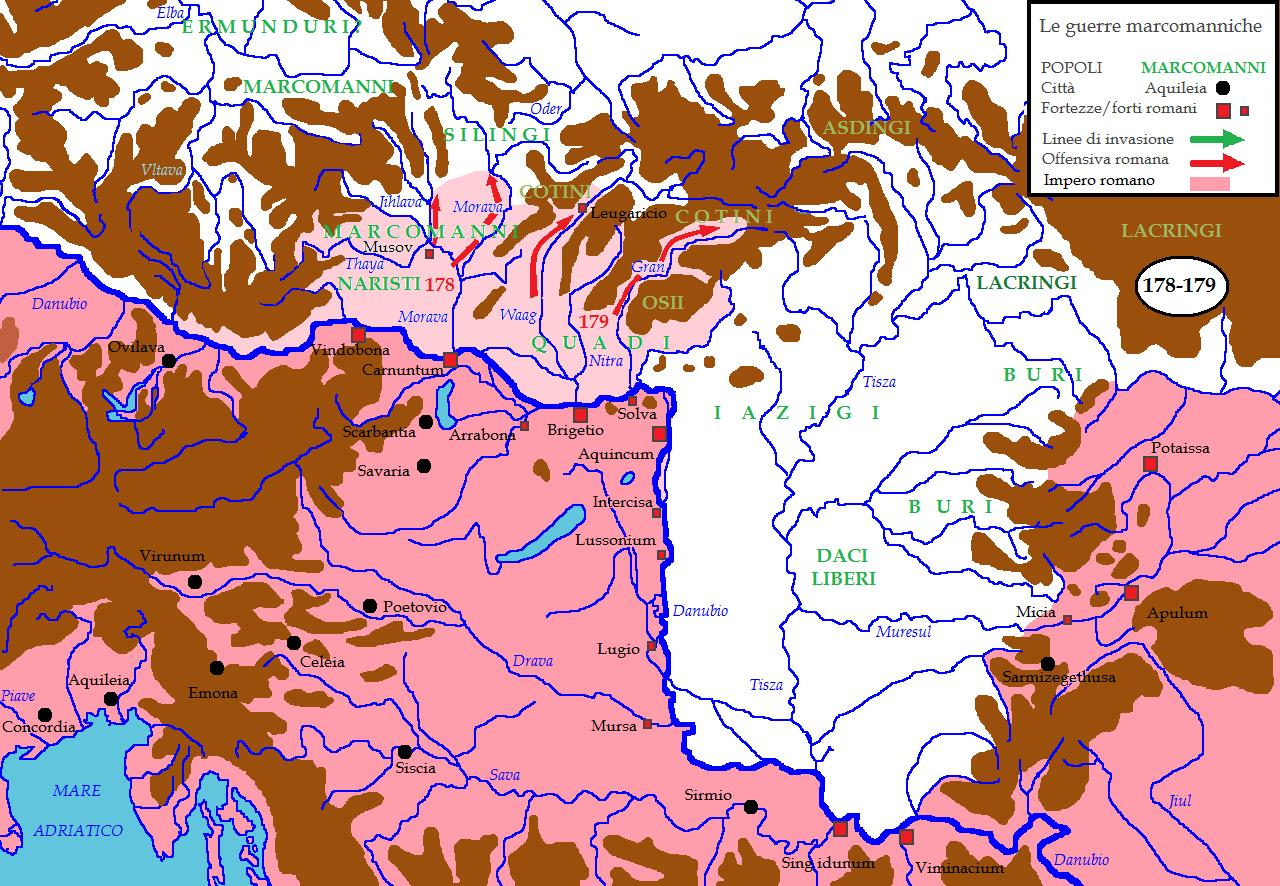
The territories of Marcomannia and Sarmatia during the period of the wars of 170-180.

Between 162 and 166, Lucius Verus was thus forced by his brother, Marcus Aurelius, to lead a new campaign in the East against the Parthians, who had attacked the Roman territories of Cappadocia and Syria the previous year and occupied the "client" kingdom of Armenia. The new emperor let his own generals take charge, including Avidius Cassius. The Roman armies, just as had Trajan's fifty years earlier, again succeeded in occupying Armenian and Mesopotamian territories as far as the Parthian capital, Ctesiphon. However, the plague that broke out during the last year of the campaign, in 166, forced the Romans to withdraw from the newly conquered territories, bringing the disease within their own borders, and scourging their population for more than two decades.

In 166/167, the first clash along the Pannonian frontiers occurred, by a few bands of Lombard and Osii marauders, which, thanks to the prompt intervention of the border troops, were promptly repelled. The peace stipulated with the neighboring Germanic peoples north of the Danube was handled directly by the emperors themselves, Marcus Aurelius and Lucius Verus, who were now wary of the barbarian aggressors and traveled for these reasons as far as distant Carnuntum (in 168). The untimely death of his brother Lucius (in 169 not far from Aquileia), and the breaking of pacts by the barbarians (many of whom had been "clients" since the time of Tiberius), led a never-before-seen mass of them to swarm devastatingly across northern Italy as far as under the walls of Aquileia, the heart of Venetia. The impression caused was enormous: not since the time of Marius had a barbarian population laid siege to centers in northern Italy.

It is said that Marcus Aurelius fought a long and exhausting war against the barbarian populations, first repelling them and "cleaning up" the territories of Cisalpine Gaul, Noricum, and Rhaetia (170-171), then counterattacking with a massive offensive in Germanic territory, which took several years of fighting, until 175. The Historia Augusta recounts that Marcus Aurelius would have wished to make the territories of the former "client" peoples of the Quadi and Marcomanni the province of Marcomannia and of the Iazyges, that of Sarmatia, and would have succeeded if Avidius Cassius had not rebelled.

These events forced the emperor himself to reside for numerous years along the Pannonian front, never returning to Rome. However, the truce signed with these peoples, particularly the Marcomanni, Quadi, and Iazyges, lasted only a couple of years. At the end of 178 the emperor Marcus Aurelius was forced to return to the castrum of Brigetio from where, in the following spring of 179, the last campaign was conducted. The death of the Roman emperor in 180 soon put an end to Roman expansionist plans and resulted in the abandonment of the occupied territories of Marcomannia and the making of new treaties with the "client" populations northeast of the middle Danube.

==== Military anarchy (235-286) ====
During the period of military anarchy, the Roman-allied "client" kingdom of Hatra fell under the blows of the Sasanian armies of Ardashir I. Its fall initiated a new Sasanian invasion that led to the occupation of much of Roman Mesopotamia (including the legionary fortresses of Rhesaina and Singara, as well as the auxiliary fort of Zagurae, today's Ain Sinu), even going so far as to besiege and occupy Antioch of Syria, as seems to be suggested by the fact that its mint stopped minting coinage for the years 240 and 241.

Gordian III, during the military campaign conducted personally against Shapur I, placed himself at the head of an army recruited from "the whole Roman empire and from among the peoples of the Goths and Germans," is inferred from an inscription found at Naqs-i-Rustam commemorating the victory against the Romans. Gordian had thus resorted to a conspicuous number of gentiles (mercenary volunteers or foederati), Goths and Germans from the Danubian limes. Philip the Arab, on the other hand, dismissed many of these mercenaries, preferring to pay 500,000 denarii to the Sasanians rather than continue the campaign against them, and generating widespread discontent among the federates over the suspension of the customary payment of tribute.

== See also ==
- List of Roman client rulers
- Puppet state
- Buffer state
- Clientelism
- Foederati

== Bibliography ==
Ancient sources

- Appian of Alexandria. Roman History (Ῥωμαϊκά) (in Ancient Greek). (English translation Archived 2015-11-20 at the Wayback Machine).
- Caesar. Commentarii de Bello Gallico (in Latin). (Latin text or here).
- Caesar. Commentarii de bello civili (in Latin). (Latin text).
- Codex Manichaicus Coloniensis, 18.
- Cassius Dio. Roman History (in Ancient Greek). (Latin text and English translation).
- Flavius Josephus. The Jewish War (in Ancient Greek). (English translation).
- Historia Augusta (in Latin). (Latin text e English translation).
- Livy. Ab Urbe condita libri (in Latin). (Latin text and English version).
- Plutarch. Parallel Lives (in Ancient Greek). (Greek text and English translation).
- Strabo. Geographica (in Ancient Greek). Vol. V. (English translation).
- Suetonius. Life of Augustus (in Latin).
- Suetonius. Life of Tiberius (in Latin).
- Suetonius. Life of Vespasian (in Latin).
- Tacitus. Annals (in Latin).
- Tacitus. Germania (in Latin).
- Velleius Paterculus. Roman History (in Latin).

Coin collections

- AA.VV. Roman Imperial Coinage. (sito ufficiale Archived 2020-01-28 at the Wayback Machine).

Modern historiographical sources

- J.-M.Carriè (2008). Eserciti e strategie. Vol. 18. Milano.
- D.Kennedy (1989). J.Wacher (ed.). L'Oriente. Bari.
- X.Loriot (1975). Les premières années de la grande crise du III siècle: de l'avènement de Maximin Thrace (235) à la mort de Gordian III (244). Vol. II.2. Aufstieg Niedergang Römischen Welt.
- E.Luttwak (1981). La grande Strategia dell'Impero romano. Milano.
- F.Millar (1993). The Roman near East (31 BC - AD 337). Cambridge Massachusetts & London.
- P.Southern (2001). The Roman Empire: from Severus to Constantine. Londra & New York.
- A.Piganiol (1989). Le conquiste dei Romani. Milano.
- Wilker, Julia (2022-09-15). "Client kings". Oxford Classical Dictionary. Oxford University Press. doi:10.1093/acrefore/9780199381135.013.1677.
- Wilker, Julia (2022-09-15). "Client kings". Oxford Classical Dictionary. Oxford University Press. doi:10.1093/acrefore/9780199381135.013.1677.
