= Epigram of Amazaspos =

Poem

- Material: Stone
- Writing: Greek script
- Created: 114-117 AD
- Place: Rome
- Language: Ancient Greek

The epigram of Amazaspos (Georgian: ამაზასპის ეპიგრამა) is a poetic funerary epigram written in Ancient Greek on an inscription found at the Villa Medici in Rome. It memorialises the death of the Pharnavazid royal prince Amazaspos, brother of kings Mihrdat I and Rhadamistus, son of king Pharasmanes I of Iberia, who died at Nisibis while accompanying the emperor Trajan on his Parthian expedition during the Roman–Parthian Wars.

The epigram seems to be a work of some litterateur in emperor Trajan's company during his Parthian expedition and it seems he was personally aware of Amazaspos' charms where he is compared to "modest maidens". It is suggested that this poet may have been emperor Hadrian himself. Authorship of the epigram for prince Amazaspos by Hadrian would explain how the text was available to be inscribed in Rome as the stone may have been erected there in a public place during Hadrian's reign as a reminder of the cost to the Roman Empire of its policy of expansion as Hadrian quickly gave up almost all the lands Trajan had conquered. Presumably the prince's remains had also been transferred by Hadrian to Rome. The inscription is dated 114-117 AD. Amazaspos is also mentioned in Stele of Vespasian, though according to Cyril Toumanoff that Amazaspos is King Amazasp I of Iberia. Inscription is currently missing and is deemed to be lost.

== Inscription ==
=== Ancient Greek inscription ===
ὁ κλεινὸς ἶνις βασιλέως Ἀμάζασπος,
ὁ Μιθριδάτου βασιλέως κασίγνητος,
ᾧ γαῖα πατρὶς Κασπίας παρὰ κλῄθρας
Ἴβηρ Ἴβηρος ἐνθαδὶ τετάρχυται
πόλιν παρ’ ἱρήν, ἣν ἔδειμε Νικάτωρ
ἐλαιόθηλον ἀμφὶ Μυγδόνος νᾶμα.
θάνεν δ’ ὀπαδὸς Αὐσόνων ἁγητῆρι
μολὼν ἄνακτι Παρθικὴν ἐφ’ ὑσμίνην,
πρίν περ παλάξαι χεῖρα δηίῳ λύθρωι,
ἴφθιμον αἰαῖ χεῖρα δουρὶ καὶ τόξωι
καὶ φασγάνου κνώδοντι, πεζὸς ἱππ[εύς τε]·
ὁ δ’ αὐτὸς ἶσος παρθένοισιν αἰδοίαις.

The illustrious king's son Amazaspos,
the brother of King Mithridates,
whose native land lies by the Caspian Gates,
Iberian, son of Iberian, is buried here,
by the sacred city which Nicator built,
around the olive-nurturing stream of Mygdon.
He died, companion to the Ausonian leader,
going for the lord to Parthian battle,
yet before he had spattered his hand with enemy gore,
mighty the hand, alas, with spear and bow,
and with the sword-blade, on foot and on horse.
And he himself the peer of modest maidens.

== Bibliography ==
- Cyril Toumanoff (1969) Chronology of the Early Kings of Iberia, Fordham University
- A. Chaniotis, T. Corsten, R. S. Stroud & R. A. Tybout (2006) Supplementum Epigraphicum Graecum
- Stephen H. Rapp Jr (2014) The Sasanian World through Georgian Eyes: Caucasia and the Iranian Commonwealth in Late Antique Georgian Literature
- David Braund (1993) King Flavius Dades, Zeitschrift für Papyrologie und Epigraphik
- University of Sydney (2006) Mediterranean Archaeology, Volumes 19-20, Department of Archeology
- E. Kobakhidze & N. Phiphia (2023) Epitaph of Amazaspos, Tbilisi State University, Ancient Greco-Roman epigraphy as a source of Georgian history (N FR-18-2018) Shota Rustaveli National Science Foundation
