= Arsaces I of Armenia =

King of Armenia in 35 AD

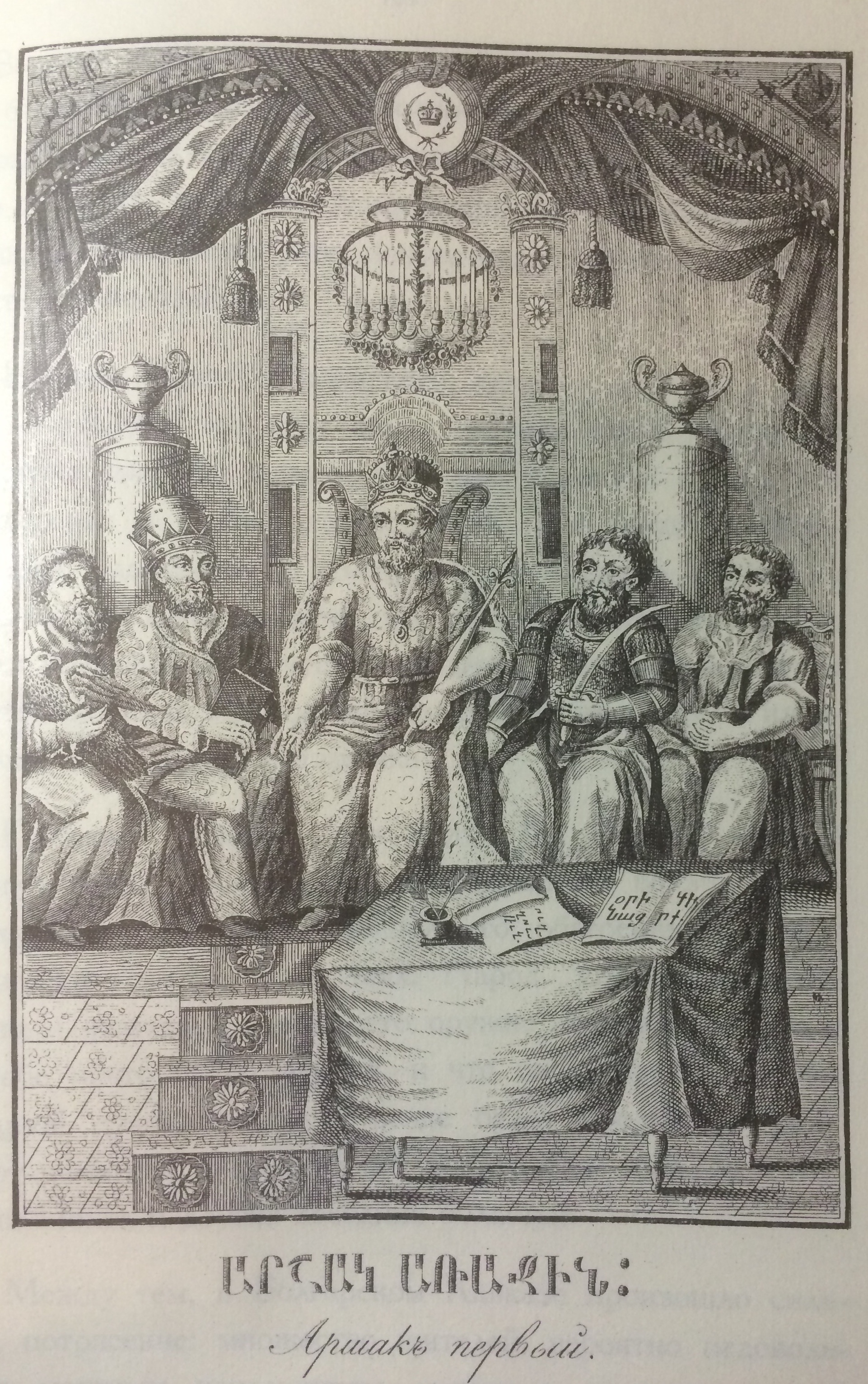
- King Arsaces I, a 19th century depiction.

king of Armenia
- Predecessor: Artaxias III
- Successor: Mithridates of Armenia
- Born: Unknown
- Died: 35
- House: Arsacid dynasty
- Father: Artabanus II of Parthia
- Mother: Unknown

Arsaces I of Armenia, also known as Arsaces I, Arshak I and Arsak (ruled 35 AD) was a Parthian prince who was king of Armenia during 35 AD.

Arsaces I was the first-born son of King Artabanus II of Parthia by a wife whose name is unknown. After the death of the Roman client king of Armenia, Artaxias III, in 34 AD, Artabanus II decided to put his son on the Armenian throne. Artabanus II made Arsaces I king of Armenia and Arsaces was accompanied to Armenia with a strong army. Roman emperor Tiberius, refused to accept Arsaces I as king. So Tiberius, with the support of King Pharasmanes I of Iberia, appointed Pharasmanes' brother, Mithridates, to be the new Roman client Armenian king.

Less than a year into his reign, Arsaces I was poisoned by his servants who had been bribed to kill him. After Arsaces I died, Artabanus II put another of his sons, Orodes, on the Armenian throne. Orodes soon had to face Mithridates in a military campaign.

== Sources ==
- Tacitus, Annals of Imperial Rome, 1st century.

== Bibliography ==
- R. Grousset, History of Armenia from its origins to 1071, Paris Payot, 1947 (reprinted again in 1984, 1995 & 2008)
- M.L. Chaumont, Armenia between Rome and Iran I: the advent of Augustus to the accession of Diocletian from Aufstieg und Niedergang der römischen Welt II, 1976
- G. Dedeyan, History of the Armenian people, Privat Toulouse, 2007
- Schmitt, Tassilo (2022). "König Pharasmanes I. als Bumberazi (ბუმბერაზი) bei Tacitus. Erwägungen zu kaukasisch-iberischer Heldenepik, Kulturtransfer, senatorischer Selbstdarstellung und römischer Historiographie" [King Pharasmanes I as Bumberazi (ბუმბერაზი) in Tacitus. Considerations on Caucasian-Iberian heroic epic, cultural transfer, senatorial self-representation and Roman historiography]. Phasis 25, pp. 49–114.

Regnal titles
Preceded by Artaxias III	Roman Client King of Armenia; 35	Succeeded by Mithridates I
