= Mihrdat I =

1st century King of Iberia (Kartli, Georgia)

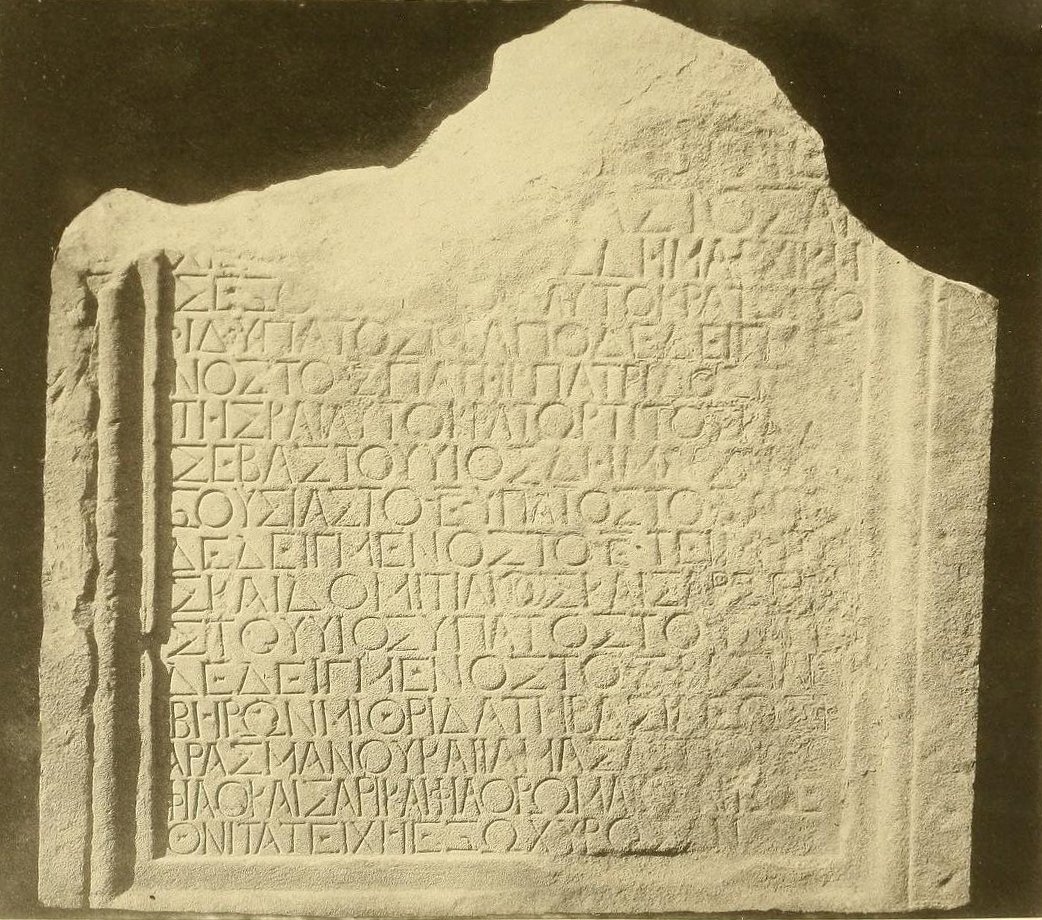
- Mihrdat I is mentioned on Stele of Vespasian

11th King of Iberia
- Reign: 58–106
- Predecessor: Pharasmanes I of Iberia
- Successor: Amazasp I of Iberia
- Born: c. 1st century Mtskheta, Kingdom of Iberia
- Died: c. 2nd century
- Issue: Amazasp I of Iberia
- Dynasty: Pharnavazid dynasty
- Father: Pharasmanes I of Iberia
- Religion: Georgian paganism

Mithridates I (Mihrdat I) (Georgian: მითრიდატე I) was the 1st-century king (mepe) of Iberia (Kartli, Georgia) whose reign is evidenced by epigraphic material. Cyril Toumanoff suggests 58–106 as the years of his reign.

== Armazi inscriptions ==
Two inscriptions unearthed at Armazi, Georgia. One bilingual in Aramaic and Greek. The Greek inscription identifies Mithridates I as the son of the "great king" Pharasmanes (P'arsman), apparently the Pharasmanes I of Iberia of Tacitus’s Annals (In the same work Tacitus also mentions Mithridates I himself). The stone inscription in Greek speaks of Mithridates I as "the friend of the Caesars" and the king "of the Roman-loving Iberians". It also reports that the Roman emperor Vespasian fortified Armazi for the Iberian king in 75. His mother was an unnamed Armenian princess of the Artaxiad dynasty being the daughter of the Artaxiad Armenian monarchs Tigranes IV and his sister-wife Erato.

== Medieval Georgian chronicles ==
Mithridates I is ignored by the medieval Georgian chronicles which instead, report a joint rule of Kartam (Kardzam) and Bartom (Bratman), in the time when Vespasian's destruction of Jerusalem in 70 spurred a wave of the refugee Jews to Iberia; Kartam and Bartom were supposedly succeeded by their sons, Parsman and Kaos, and grandsons, Azork and Armazel. Several modern scholars, such as Cyril Toumanoff, consider the Iberian diarchy a pure legend and a "deformed memory of the historical reign of Mithridates I". Of these royal pairs, Professor Giorgi Melikishvili identifies "Azork" as Mithridates I's possible local name and "Armazel" as a territorial epithet, meaning in Georgian "of Armazi".

== Other sources ==
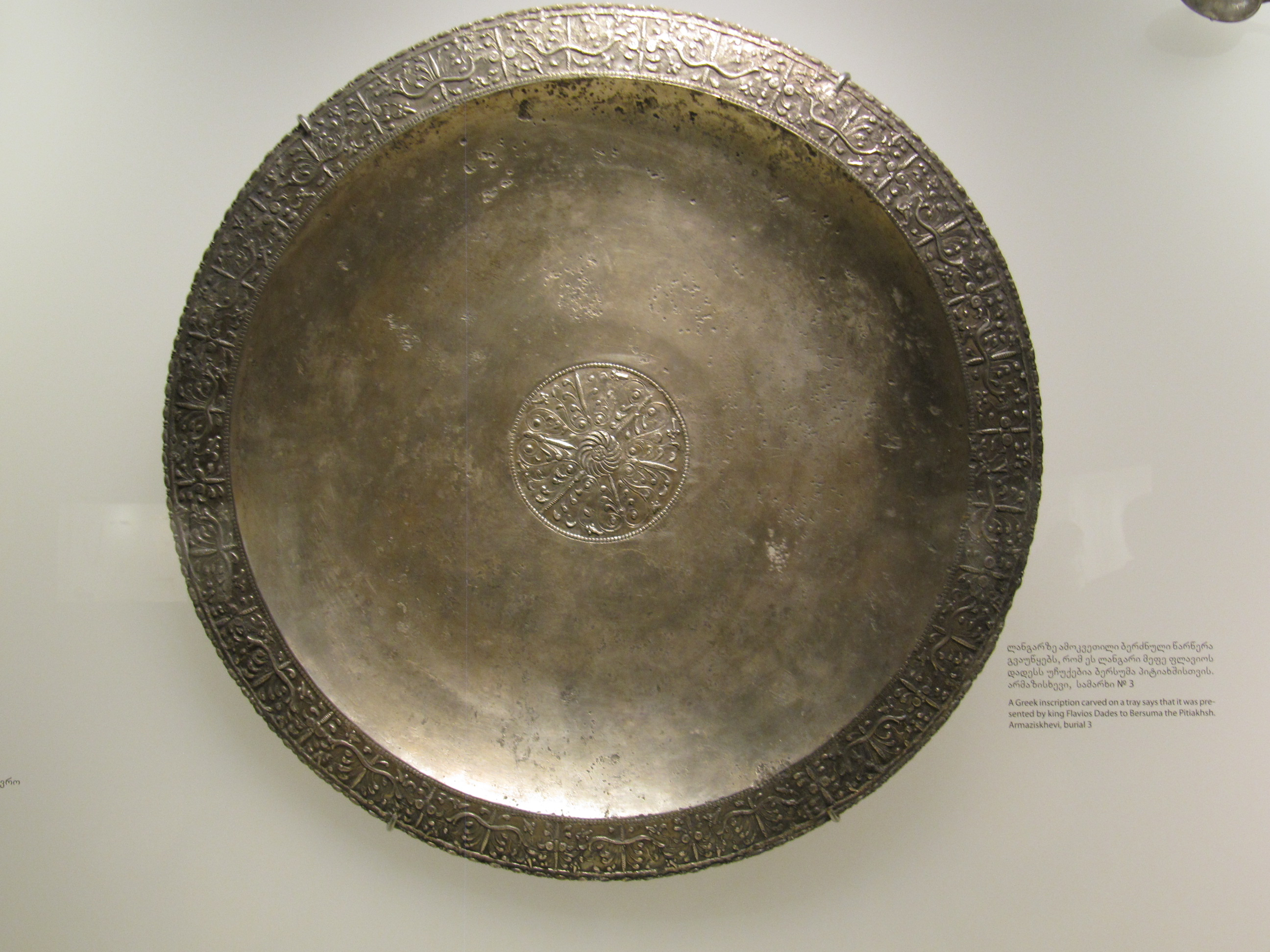
The Bersoumas dish at the Georgian National Museum in Tbilisi.

There is another Greek inscription found in Rome. This Epigram of Amazaspos names Amazaspus as brother of King Mithridates I of Iberia. The inscription records Amazapus's death at Nisibis, while accompanying the emperor Trajan on his Parthian campaign of 114–117.

Some modern scholars identify Mithridates I with the King Flavius Dades, known from a single Greek inscription around the edge of the base of a large silver dish found at Armazi. The dish was part of the inventory of a rich Roman-era burial conventionally known as "the Bersoumas burial" after the high dignitary Bersoumas to whom, the inscriptions says, this piece was presented by the King Flavius Dades. There is no mention of him in the medieval Georgian written tradition and appears to be the only Roman name attested in the Iberian ruling house, evidently indicating that he held Roman citizenship. The identification of this monarch and his place in the Iberian royal dynasty remains problematic, however. Mithridates I was succeeded by his son, Amazaspus I.

Preceded by Pharasmanes I	King of Iberia; 58–106	Succeeded by Amazaspus I
