= Stele of Vespasian =

Stele found in an ancient Georgian capital

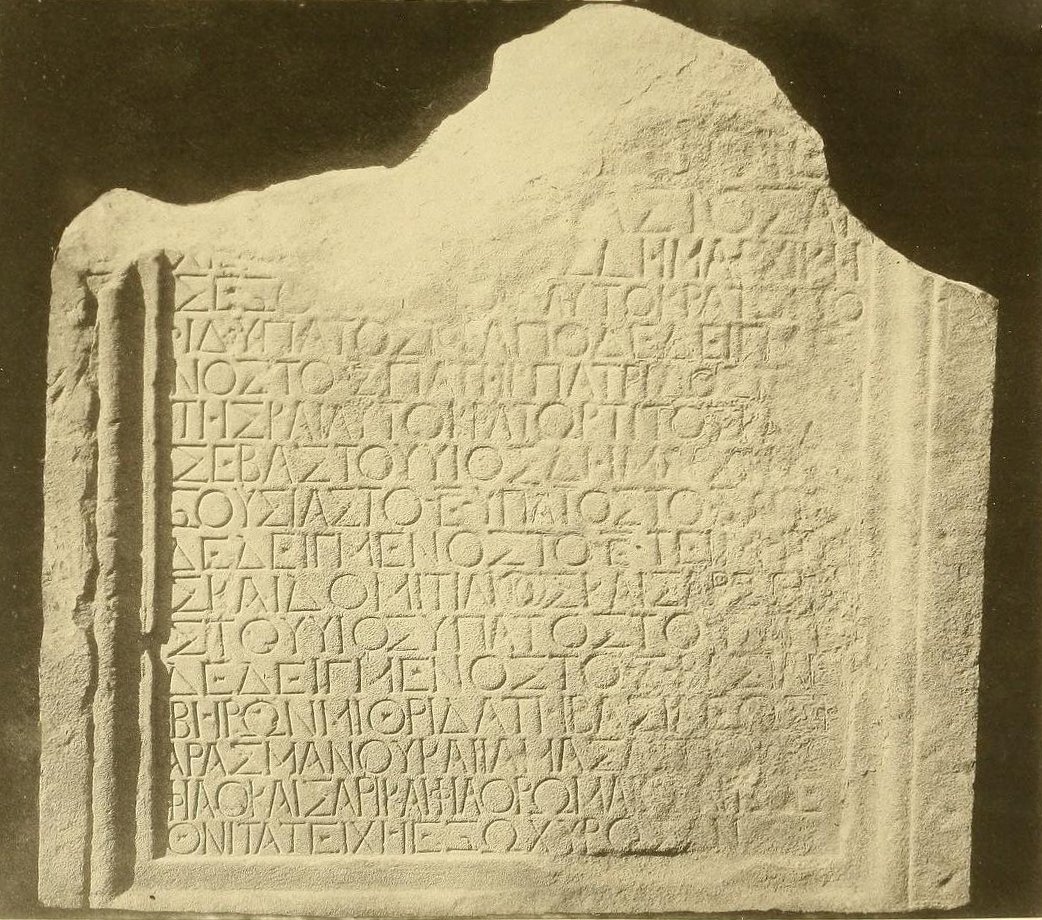
- Material: Stone
- Size: 126 x 116
- Writing: Ancient Greek
- Created: 75 AD
- Discovered: 1867
- Place: Armazi
- Present location: Georgian National Museum, Rustaveli Avenue, Tbilisi, Georgia

The Stele of Vespasian is a stele celebrating Roman emperor Vespasian. It was written in Ancient Greek and found in 1867 at Armazi, near Mtskheta (eastern Georgia), in an ancient capital of the Kingdom of Iberia.

== Stele ==
The stele memorialises reinforcement of the fortification of Armazi walls by Emperor Vespasian. Additionally, the inscription mentions two emperors Titus, Domitian and two kings Mihrdat I of Iberia, Pharasmanes I of Iberia and prince royal Amazaspus. The inscription is dated to 75 AD. The top of the stele is lost. According to Professor David Braund, the missing text was in Latin or Armazic (outgrowth of Aramaic language). Cyril Toumanoff identifies Amazaspus as King Amazasp I of Iberia, though it can be prince royal Amazaspus, son of Pharasmanes I of Iberia, who is known from the Epigram of Amazaspos found in Rome.

== Inscription ==
Imperator Caesar Vespasianus Augustus, pontifex maximus, holding the tribunician power for the seventh time, imperator for the fourteenth time, consul for the sixth time, and designated for the seventh, father of the fatherland, censor and imperator Titus Caesar, son of Augustus, holding the tribunician power for the fifth time, consul for the fourth time and designated for the fifth, censor, and Domitianus Caesar, son of Augustus, consul for the third time and designated for the fourth, for the king of the Iberians, Mithridates, son of King Pharasmanes, and Amazaspus, friend of Caesar and of the Romans, and for his people [Iberians] they [Romans] fortified the walls.

== Bibliography ==
- Stephen H. Rapp Jr (2014) The Sasanian World through Georgian Eyes: Caucasia and the Iranian Commonwealth in Late Antique Georgian Literature
- Ronald Grigor Suny (1994) The Making of the Georgian Nation, Indiana University Press, ISBN 978-0253209153
- Cyril Toumanoff (1969) Chronology of the Early Kings of Iberia, Fordham University
- Giorgi Lomtatidze (1955) Archaeological excavations in an ancient Georgian capital of Mtskheta, Georgian National Academy of Sciences
- Gela Gamkrelidze (2014) Archaeology of Roman period of Georgia
