= Orodes of Armenia =

King of Armenia from 37 to 42 AD

Orodes of Armenia (flourished 1st century) was a Parthian prince who served as a Roman client king of Armenia in 35 and from again 37 until 42. Orodes was the second born son of King Artabanus II of Parthia by a wife whose name is unknown. He was born and raised in the Parthian empire. Orodes was the namesake of his Parthian relations who ruled with this name as king.

In 35 after the death of his older brother Arsaces I, who served briefly as Roman client king of Armenia, Artabanus II installed him as the new king of Armenia. When Orodes arrived in Armenia, Orodes avenged the death of Arsaces I by executing the bribed servants who poisoned Arsaces.

As this time the Roman emperor Tiberius, refused to accept the kingship of Orodes and Tiberius appointed the Iberian prince Mithridates as the new Roman client Armenian king with the support of his brother, King Pharasmanes I of Iberia.

Orodes faced Mithridates in a military campaign in Armenia that was in unfavorable conditions for Orodes. In the military campaign, Pharasmanes I had sent his own troops and mercenaries to assist Mithridates. Orodes had the support of the Parthian army. Orodes had lost his military campaign against Mithridates in which he may have been injured and returned to Parthia.

Mithridates then became the new client king later in 35. In 37, Mithridates was arrested by the Roman emperor Caligula for unknown reasons and Orodes in 37 was restored to his kingship. He reigned from 37 until 42 and little is known on his reign. In 42, the Roman emperor Claudius replaced Orodes for unknown reasons and installed again Mithridates as the new client king.

== Sources ==
- Tacitus, Annals of Imperial Rome, 1st century
- R. Grousset, History of Armenia from its origins to 1071, Paris Payot, 1947 (reprinted again in 1984, 1995 & 2008)
- M.L. Chaumont, Armenia between Rome and Iran I: the advent of Augustus to the accession of Diocletian from Aufstieg und Niedergang der römischen Welt II, 1976
- Schmitt, Tassilo (2022). "König Pharasmanes I. als Bumberazi (ბუმბერაზი) bei Tacitus. Erwägungen zu kaukasisch-iberischer Heldenepik, Kulturtransfer, senatorischer Selbstdarstellung und römischer Historiographie" [King Pharasmanes I as Bumberazi (ბუმბერაზი) in Tacitus. Considerations on Caucasian-Iberian heroic epic, cultural transfer, senatorial self-representation and Roman historiography]. Phasis 25, pp. 49-114.

Regnal titles
Preceded by Mithridates I	King of Armenia; 37 – 42	Succeeded by Mithridates I
