= Dacicus =

Roman gold coin

The dacicus (meaning "Dacian") was a gold coin issued during the reign of the Roman emperor Domitian (50–96) in honor of his claimed victory against the Dacians in the 1st century. The terms of peace with Decebalus, the Dacian king, were severely criticised by contemporaneous authors, who considered this treaty shameful to the Romans as the treaty granted Decebalus an annual subsidy of 8 million sesterces. For the remainder of Domitian's reign, Dacia remained a relatively peaceful client kingdom, but Decebalus used the Roman money to fortify his defences and continued to defy Rome until the reign of Trajan.

The term "Dacicus" was also a victory title taken by a few Roman emperors, meaning "conqueror of Dacia". Trajan and Constantine I were awarded with this title.

== See also ==
- List of historical currencies
- Roman Republican coinage
- Roman provincial coins
