= Amazasp I =

Early 2nd century King of Iberia (Kartli, Georgia)

King of Iberia
- Reign: 106–116
- Predecessor: Mihrdat I
- Successor: Pharasmanes II
- Died: 106
- Issue: Pharasmanes II
- Dynasty: Pharnavazid dynasty
- Father: Mihrdat I

Amazasp I (Georgian: ამაზასპ I) was a king (mepe) of Iberia (Kartli, modern eastern Georgia) whose reign is placed by the early medieval Georgian historical compendia in the 2nd century. Professor Cyril Toumanoff suggests 106–116 as the years of his reign, and considers him to be the son and successor of Mithridates I of Iberia who is known from epigraphic material as a Roman ally. Toumanoff also identifies him with the Amazaspus of the Stele of Vespasian and Xepharnuges of the Stele of Serapit.

The name Amazasp derives from Middle Persian *Hamazāsp, ultimately from Old Persian Hamāzāspa. Although the precise etymology of *Hamazāsp/Hamāzāspa remains unresolved, it may be explained through Avestan *hamāza-, "colliding/clashing" + aspa-, "horse" i.e. "one who possessed war steeds".

The Georgian chronicles report Amazasp's joint ten-year rule with Derok (Deruk) and record Armazi as his seat (whereas Derok's residence was at Mtskheta). Many modern scholars, however, consider the Iberian dyarchy a pure legend and argue that Amazasp was king in his own right.

Preceded by Mithridates I	King of Iberia; 106–116	Succeeded by Pharasmanes II
