= Artaxias III =

Roman Client King of Armenia (13 BC-34 AD) (r. 18 AD-34 AD)

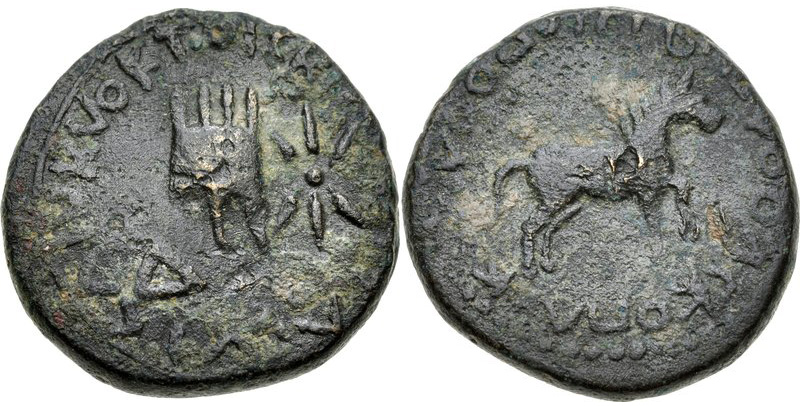
- Coin of Artaxias III

King of Armenia
- Reign: 18 – 34
- Predecessor: Vonones I
- Successor: Arsaces I
- Born: 13 BC; Bosporan Kingdom
- Died: 34 AD
- Father: Polemon I of Pontus
- Mother: Pythodorida of Pontus

Artaxias III, also known as Zeno-Artaxias, (Greek: Άρταξίας, 13 BC–34 AD) was a Pontic prince and later a Roman Client King of Armenia.

Artaxias's birth name was Zenon (Greek: Ζήνων). He was the first son and child born to Roman Client Rulers Polemon Pythodoros and Pythodorida of Pontus. His younger siblings were Polemon II of Pontus, who would succeed his mother and became the last ruler of Pontus, and Antonia Tryphaena who was the Queen of Thrace. He was of Anatolian Greek and Roman heritage.

His paternal grandfather was Zenon, a prominent orator and aristocrat, who was an ally to Roman Triumvir Mark Antony. His maternal grandparents were Pythodoros of Tralles and Antonia. Zenon was named after his paternal grandfather. Through his maternal grandmother he was a direct descendant of Mark Antony and his second wife Antonia Hybrida Minor.

Artaxias’ father died in 8 BC. His mother married Roman Client King Archelaus of Cappadocia. The family had moved to Cappadocia and along with his siblings were raised in the court of their stepfather. Archelaus had died in 17 AD. After his death, his mother and Polemon II moved back to Pontus.

In 18 AD, the previous Armenian King, Vonones I, was exiled and Artaxias was a popular choice with the Armenians to replace him. Roman general Germanicus, with the approval of the Roman emperor Tiberius, agreed that Artaxias be crowned as the new Roman client king of Armenia.

The Armenians paid homage to him and acclaimed him as King Artaxias. He was named after the city of Artaxata in which he was proclaimed king. Artaxias reigned until his death in 34 AD. He was succeeded by Arsaces I, one of the sons of King Artabanus II of Parthia. Artaxias never married nor did he have any children.

== Sources ==
- Kovacs, Frank (2014). "Artaxias III and a Numismatic Enigma". Armenian Numismatic Journal. 10 (1): 19–25. ISSN 0884-0180.
- Kovacs, Frank (2014). "Artaxias III - Supplementary Photos with Legends". Armenian Numismatic Journal. 10 (1): 19–25. ISSN 0884-0180.
- Marek Jan, Olbrycht (2016). "Germanicus, Artabanos II of Parthia, and Zeno Artaxias in Armenia". Klio. 98 (2): 605–633. ISSN 2192-7669.
- Tacitus, Annals of Imperial Rome
- Artaxias' article at ancient library
- Ptolemaic Genealogy: Cleopatra VII

Preceded by Vonones I	King of Armenia; 18 – 34	Succeeded by Arsaces I
