= Tiridates III of Parthia =

King of the Parthian Empire from 35 to 36 AD

Tiridates III of Parthia (Persian: تيرداد سوم) ruled the Parthian Empire briefly in 35–36. He was the grandson of Phraates IV. He was sent to Rome as a hostage and was educated there.

In about 36, when the Parthian nobility rebelled against Artabanus II of Parthia, they applied to the Roman emperor Tiberius for a king of the race of Phraates. Tiberius sent Tiridates to the east, and ordered Lucius Vitellius (the father of the emperor Vitellius) to restore Roman authority there. By very dexterous military and diplomatic operations Vitellius succeeded completely. Artabanus was deserted by his followers and fled.

However, Tiridates, who was proclaimed king, could not maintain himself, because he appeared to be a vassal of the Romans. Artabanus soon returned from Hyrcania with a strong army of Scythian (Dahan) auxiliaries, and was again acknowledged by the Parthians. Tiridates left Seleucia and fled to Syria.

The Roman historian Tacitus writes that the Parthian court official Abdagaeses, who exerted political control over Tiridates, spared Tiridates from danger by preventing him from visiting the Parthian tribes. This policy kept the distrustful clans from uniting against Tiridates in the meantime. However, when the situation became untenable, it was Abdagaeses who advised Tiridates to retreat west to Mesopotamia where strategic defensive locations were suitable. This move was viewed as an act of cowardice by the Parthian tribes, which led to Tiridates' ousting from his seat of power.

== Notes ==
Tiridates III of Parthia Arsacid dynasty
Preceded by Artabanus II	King of the Parthian Empire; 35–36	Succeeded by Artabanus II
