= Pharasmanes I =

1st century AD King of Iberia

Pharasmanes I the Great
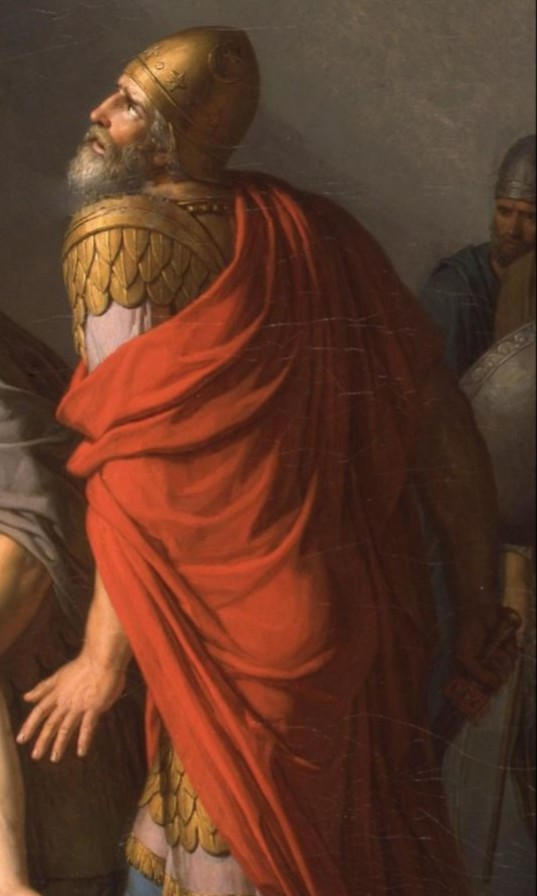
- Depiction by Jean-Joseph Taillasson, 1806

King of Iberia
- Reign: 1 – 58
- Predecessor: Artaxias II
- Successor: Mihrdat I
- Born: 1st-century BC; Mtskheta, Kingdom of Iberia
- Died: 58 AD
- Spouse: Daughter of Tigranes IV
- Issue: Rhadamistus; Mihrdat I; Amazaspus; unnamed daughter
- Dynasty: Pharnavazid
- Father: Kartam of Colchis
- Mother: Daughter of Pharnavaz II
- Religion: Georgian paganism

Pharasmanes I the Great (died 58) was a king (mepe) of Iberia. He plays a prominent role in the historian Tacitus' account of policy and campaigns in the eastern lands of the Roman Empire under Tiberius, Caligula, Claudius and Nero. According to Cyril Toumanoff, Pharasmanes was a member of the third Pharnavazid dynasty and reigned from 1 to 58. Pharasmanes is mentioned on the Stele of Vespasian. During his reign, Iberia was transformed into the Transcaucasian empire, that would dominate the kingdoms of Armenia and Albania.

== Life ==
As allies of Rome, his brother Mithridates was installed as king of Armenia by Roman emperor Tiberius, who invaded Armenia in 35. When the Parthian prince Orodes, son of Artabanus II of Parthia, attempted to dispossess Mithridates of his newly acquired kingdom, Pharasmanes led a large Iberian army and defeated the Parthians in a pitched battle (Tacitus, Annals. vi. 32–35). Pharasmanes personally smashed Orod's helmet with one blow: Orod galloped off, and the rumours of his death demoralized the Parthians.

Around 52, Pharasmanes instigated his son, Rhadamistus, whose ambitious and aspiring character began to give him umbrage, to make war upon his uncle Mithridates, and supported him in his enterprise. After a short reign, Rhadamistus was in turn expelled by the Parthians in 55, and took refuge again in his father's dominions. The Romans had expressed their displeasure at the proceedings of Rhadamistus, and in order to curry their favor, Pharasmanes put his son to death. Pharasmanes was apparently succeeded by Mihrdat I.

== Family ==
At an unknown date, Pharasmanes married an unnamed Armenian princess of the Artaxiad dynasty. She was the daughter of the Artaxiad Armenian monarchs Tigranes IV and his sister-wife Erato. His Armenian wife bore him three sons: Rhadamistus, Mihrdat I, and Amazaspus (Amazasp), who is known from the Epigram of Amazaspos found in Rome.

== Diarchy ==
Toumanoff has tentatively suggested the identification of Pharasmanes with the Aderki (or Rok) of the medieval Georgian chronicles whose reign is said to have coincided with the appearance of the first Christian communities in Iberia, and the travel of the Jews from Mtskheta to Jerusalem whence they witnessed the crucifixion of Jesus and brought the Holy Tunic to Iberia. According to the Georgian chronicles, Aderki's division of his kingdom between his two sons, Kartam (Kardzam) and Bartom (Bratman), inaugurated the start of dyarchy in Iberia which would last for five generations. Many modern scholars, however, doubt the existence of the diarchy, for the contemporary foreign source make references only to sole monarch.

== See also ==
- Iberian–Armenian War

== Bibliography ==
- Grousset, Rene (1947). History of Armenia from its origins to 1071. Payot.
- Rapp, Stephen H. (2003). Studies In Medieval Georgian Historiography: Early Texts And Eurasian Contexts, pp. 285-287. Peeters Publishers. ISBN 90-429-1318-5.
- Rayfield, Donald (2013). Edge of Empires: A History of Georgia. Reaktion Books. ISBN 9781780230702.
- Schmitt, Tassilo (2022). "König Pharasmanes I. als Bumberazi (ბუმბერაზი) bei Tacitus. Erwägungen zu kaukasisch-iberischer Heldenepik, Kulturtransfer, senatorischer Selbstdarstellung und römischer Historiographie" [King Pharasmanes I as Bumberazi (ბუმბერაზი) in Tacitus. Considerations on Caucasian-Iberian heroic epic, cultural transfer, senatorial self-representation and Roman historiography]. Phasis 25, pp. 49-114.
- Toumanoff, Cyril (1967). Studies in Christian Caucasian History. Georgetown University Press.

Preceded by Artaxias II	King of Iberia c. 1 – 58	Succeeded by Mithridates I
