= Artabanus II of Parthia =

King of Kings of the Parthian Empire (r. 12 AD – 38/41 AD)

Artabanus II 𐭍𐭐𐭕𐭓
- King of Kings
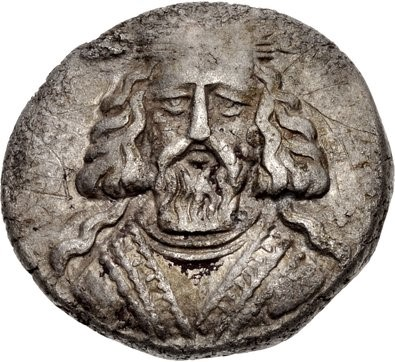
- Coin of Artabanus II, minted at Seleucia in 27 AD

King of Media Atropatene
- Reign: ???–12 AD
- Predecessor: Artavasdes II
- Successor: Vonones II

King of the Parthian Empire
- Reign: 12–38/41 AD (Note: Briefly interrupted in 35.)
- Predecessor: Vonones I (predecessor); Tiridates III (rival king)
- Successor: Vardanes I
- Born: 30–25 BC; Dahistan
- Died: 38/41 AD
- Issue: Arsaces I Orodes; Vardanes I Artabanus; Gotarzes II (adopted)
- Dynasty: Arsacid dynasty
- Father: Dahae or Atropatid prince
- Mother: unnamed daughter of Phraates IV
- Religion: Zoroastrianism

Artabanus II (also spelled Artabanos II or Ardawan II; Parthian: 𐭍𐭐𐭕𐭓 Ardawān), incorrectly known in older scholarship as Artabanus III, was King of Kings of the Parthian Empire from 12 to 38/41 AD, with a one-year interruption. He was the nephew and successor of Vonones I (r. 8–12). His father has been variously identified as a Dahae or Atropatid prince, whilst his mother was a daughter of the Parthian King of Kings Phraates IV (r. 37–2 BC).

Before his ascension to the Parthian throne, Artabanus had ruled as king of Media Atropatene, which later served as his base of attacks against the Roman-supported Parthian king Vonones I. Artabanus eventually defeated Vonones I, who fled to Armenia and became its king. Artabanus' efforts to replace Vonones I with his son were blocked by the Romans, who eventually reached an agreement with the Parthians to appoint Artaxias III the new king of Armenia and renounce their support of Vonones I.

== Name ==
Artabanus is the Latin form of the Greek Artábanos (Ἁρτάβανος), itself from the Old Persian *Arta-bānu ("the glory of Arta."). The Parthian and Middle Persian variant was Ardawān (𐭍𐭐𐭕𐭓).

== Background ==
Artabanus was not from the ruling branch of the Arsacid royal family. Tacitus in his Annals records that supporters of the rival ruler Tiridates III (r. 36–35 AD) viewed Artabanus as an "Arsacid on his mother's side, but in all else a degenerate". However, historian Marek Olbrycht notes that Tacitus, as well as Josephus and Cassius Dio, refer to Artabanus and his sons as Arsacids. Olbrycht concludes, therefore, that Artabanus was a male-line Arsacid, likely descended from Mithridates II of Parthia (r. 124–88 BC), through a branch of the family living among the Dahae people (with whom Artabanus had been reared). Olbrycht suggests that Artabanus' mother was a daughter of the Parthian King of Kings Phraates IV (r. 37–2 BC). (Note: Olbrycht hypothesises that Artabanus' father, a Dahae prince ruling over Transcaspian tribes, had gained Phraates' favour by coming to the latter's aid when needed, and consequently received his daughter in marriage.) As a result of this connection, the family of Tiridates III, the male-line grandson of Phraates IV, would have acknowledged Artabanus' maternal Arsacid ancestry, though not his paternal, having viewed all other branches of the family as illegitimate.

However, historians Josef Markwart and Martin Schottky assign to Artabanus a descent from the Atropatid dynasty, the erstwhile rulers of Media-Atropatene. This was a region controlled afterwards by Artabanus, prior to his ascension to the Parthian throne. Historian Richard D. Sullivan notes that Strabo, writing during this latter period, recorded that the line of succession from the dynasty's founder Atropates "is preserved until now", possibly implying that Artabanus' occupation of Media-Atropatene was considered a continuation of Atropatid rule. Strabo also mentioned that intermarriage had occurred between the Arsacids and the Atropatids. Sullivan suggests, therefore, that Artabanus was the result of the union between an Atropatid prince and an Arsacid princess in c. 31 BC, therefore accounting for Tacitus' statement of his ancestry. Sullivan further states that this would explain the acceptability of Artabanus' (and later his brother Vonones II's) rule over both Parthia and Media-Atropatene. Schottky identifies this royal couple as having been a son of Darius I of Media Atropatene (r. 66–65 BC) (whom Schottky deduces to have also been named Darius) and a daughter of Phraates IV. (Note: Schottky suggests that the Parthian king had captured the family of Darius I upon defeating Media-Atropatene in battle. Phraates then married his daughter to a member of the family, in the hopes of setting up a vassal house to rule under the Parthians. However, when the Romans installed their own client king, Phraates would then have sent the family to Hyrcania, where Artabanus subsequently spent his childhood.) Alternatively, historian Christian Settipani proposes that the Atropatid prince was a son of Artavasdes I of Media Atropatene (r. 56–31 BC).

== Early life and kingship of Media Atropatene ==
Born between 30–25 BC, Artabanus was raised amongst the Dahae in Central Asia. When he reached adulthood, he became the ruler of Media Atropatene, which occurred sometime during the late reign of Phraates IV or during the reign of the latter's son and successor Phraates V (r. 4 BC – 2 AD). The factor behind Artabanus' rise to kingship of Media Atropatene is unclear. The kingdom served as Artabanus' headquarters of his attacks against the Parthian king Vonones I (r. 8–12 AD), with whom he fought against over the crown. Vonones I, who had originally resided in Rome, had been placed on the Parthian throne by a faction led by the Karin and Suren clans. His rule was supported by the Romans. However, the Parthian nobility was quickly alienated by Vonones I, who had become Romanized during his stay in Rome. This increased Artabanus' odds—after years of fighting—to finally defeat Vonones I, who fled to Armenia and became its king.

== Reign ==
Artabanus, now the monarch of the Parthian Empire, attempted to depose Vonones I from the Armenian throne and appoint his own son instead. This attempt was instantly opposed by the Romans, who regarded this as posing a danger to their interests. As a result, the Roman emperor Tiberius (r. 14–37 AD) sent his stepson Germanicus to prevent this from happening. However, the Roman general met no resistance from the Parthians. Instead, Germanicus reached an agreement with Artabanus to appoint Artaxias III the new king of Armenia and renounce their support of Vonones I. The Romans thus acknowledged Artabanus as the legitimate Parthian ruler. In order to ratify the friendly relationship between the two empires, Artabanus and Germanicus met on an island in the Euphrates in 18 AD.

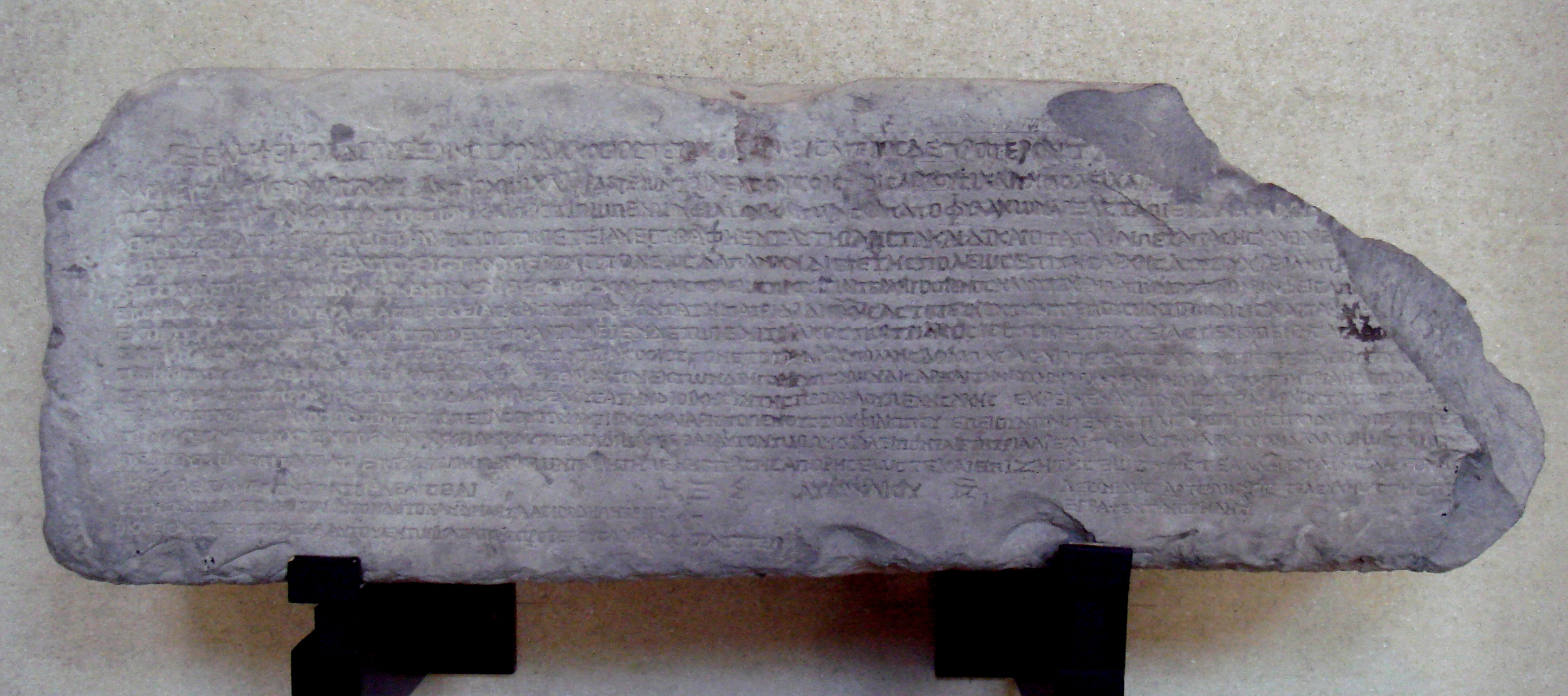
Letter in Greek of the Parthian king Artabanus II to the inhabitants of Susa in the 1st century CE, requesting the appointment of Hecataeus as treasurer. Louvre Museum.

The Romans moved Vonones I to Cilicia, where he was killed the following year after attempting to flee. His death and the now unchallenged dominance of Artabanus split the Parthian nobility, since not all of them supported a new branch of the Arsacid family taking over the empire. In 19/20 AD, the Parthian satrap of Sakastan, Drangiana and Arachosia, named Gondophares, declared independence from Artabanus and founded the Indo-Parthian Kingdom. He assumed the titles of "Great King of Kings" and "Autokrator", demonstrating his new-found independence. Nevertheless, Artabanus and Gondophares most likely reached an agreement that the Indo-Parthians would not intervene in the affairs of the Arsacids.

Artabanus spent the following years increasing his authority. To the north-east, he was victorious in his efforts to have a new dynasty established in Khwarazm, thus starting a new era in the history of the country. Artabanus most likely operated in western Bactria as well, which had been part of the Parthian domains for centuries.

In 35 AD, Artabanus tried again to conquer Armenia and to establish his son Arsaces I as Armenia's king. A war with Rome seemed inevitable. The faction among the Parthian magnates which was hostile to Artabanus II applied to Tiberius for a king who was a descendant of Phraates IV. Tiberius sent Phraates IV's grandson, Tiridates III, and ordered Lucius Vitellius the Elder (the father of the Roman emperor Vitellius) to restore Roman authority in the East. By very dexterous military and diplomatic operations Vitellius succeeded completely. Artabanus II was deserted by his followers and fled to the East.

Tiridates III, who was proclaimed King, could not keep control of the Parthian throne, because he appeared to his subjects to be a vassal of the Romans. In the meantime, Artabanus II returned from Hyrcania with a strong army of Scythian (Dahae) auxiliaries and was again acknowledged by the Parthians. Tiridates III left Seleucia and fled to Syria. Artabanus II wasn't strong enough for a war with Rome. He therefore concluded a treaty with Vitellius in 37 AD, in which he gave up all further pretensions towards Armenia. A short time afterwards Artabanus II was deposed again, and Cinnamus was proclaimed king. Artabanus II took refuge with his vassal, the King Izates bar Monobaz. Izates, by negotiations and the promise of a complete pardon, persuaded the Parthians to restore Artabanus II once more to the throne. Shortly afterwards Artabanus II died and was succeeded by his son, Vardanes I, whose reign was still more turbulent than that of his father.

Artabanus II had four sons: Arsaces I, Orodes, Artabanus, Vardanes I and an adopted son named Gotarzes II.

== Mandaeans ==
Mandaeans credit a king named Artabanus (Mandaic: Ardban), most likely to be Artabanus II, with helping them escape persecution in Jerusalem and settling in Media during his reign. He is mentioned in the Haran Gawaita, a Mandaean text.

== Sources ==
- Chaumont, M. L. (1986). "Armenia and Iran ii. The pre-Islamic period". Encyclopaedia Iranica, Vol. II, Fasc. 4. pp. 418–438.
- Chaumont, M. L.; Schippmann, K. (1988). "Balāš". Encyclopaedia Iranica, Vol. III, Fasc. 6. pp. 574–580.
- Curtis, Vesta Sarkhosh (2007). "Religious iconography on ancient Iranian coins". Journal of Late Antiquity. London: 413–434.
- Dąbrowa, Edward (2007). "The Parthian Kingship": 123–134.
- Dąbrowa, Edward (2012). "The Arsacid Empire". In Daryaee, Touraj (ed.). The Oxford Handbook of Iranian History. Oxford University Press. pp. 1–432. ISBN 978-0-19-987575-7. Archived from the original on 2019-01-01.
- Dandamayev, M. A. (1986). "Artabanus (Old Persian proper name)". Encyclopaedia Iranica, Vol. II, Fasc. 6. pp. 646–647.
- de Crespigny, Rafe (2007), A Biographical Dictionary of Later Han to the Three Kingdoms (23–220 AD), Leiden: Koninklijke Brill, ISBN 978-90-04-15605-0.
- Gregoratti, Leonardo (2017). "The Arsacid Empire". In Daryaee, Touraj (ed.). King of the Seven Climes: A History of the Ancient Iranian World (3000 BCE - 651 CE). UCI Jordan Center for Persian Studies. pp. 1–236. ISBN 9780692864401.
- Kia, Mehrdad (2016). The Persian Empire: A Historical Encyclopedia. ABC-CLIO. ISBN 978-1610693912. (2 volumes)
- Markwart, Josef (1901), Eranshahr nach der Geographie des Ps. Moses Xorenac'i (in German), Berlin: Weidmannsche Buchhandlung, p. 111
- Morton, William S.; Lewis, Charlton M. (2005), China: Its History and Culture, New York: McGraw-Hill, ISBN 978-0-07-141279-7.
- Olbrycht, Marek Jan (1997). "Parthian King's tiara - Numismatic evidence and some aspects of Arsacid political ideology". Notae Numismaticae. 2: 27–61.
- Olbrycht, Marek Jan (2012). "The Political-Military Strategy of Artabanos/Ardawān II in AD 34–371". Anabasis: Studia Classica et Orientalia. 3: 215–237.
- Olbrycht, Marek Jan (2014). "The Genealogy of Artabanos II (AD 8/9–39/40), King of Parthia". Miscellanea Anthropologica et Sociologica. 15 (3): 92–97. doi:10.5604/20842937.1134333 (inactive 11 July 2025).
- Olbrycht, Marek Jan (2015). "Arsacid Iran and the nomads of Central Asia – Ways of cultural transfer". Complexity of Interaction Along the Eurasian Steppe Zone in the First Millenium Ce, Edited by Jan Bemmann, Michael Schmauder (Bonn Contributions to Asian Archaeology, Volume 7) Bonn 2015 [Vor- und Fruhgeschichtliche Archäologie, Rheinische Friedrich-Wilhelms-Universität Bonn]: 333–390.
- Olbrycht, Marek Jan (2016). "Dynastic Connections in the Arsacid Empire and the Origins of the House of Sāsān". In Curtis, Vesta Sarkhosh; Pendleton, Elizabeth J.; Alram, Michael; Daryaee, Touraj (eds.). The Parthian and Early Sasanian Empires: Adaptation and Expansion. Oxbow Books. ISBN 9781785702082.
- Rapp, Stephen H. (2014). The Sasanian World through Georgian Eyes: Caucasia and the Iranian Commonwealth in Late Antique Georgian Literature. Ashgate Publishing, Ltd. ISBN 978-1472425522.
- Rose, Jenny (2004). "Investiture". Encyclopaedia Iranica, Vol. XIII, Fasc. 2. pp. 180–188.
- Rezakhani, Khodadad (2013). "Arsacid, Elymaean, and Persid Coinage". In Potts, Daniel T. (ed.). The Oxford Handbook of Ancient Iran. Oxford University Press. ISBN 978-0199733309.
- Schippmann, K. (1986). "Artabanus (Arsacid kings)". Encyclopaedia Iranica, Vol. II, Fasc. 6. pp. 647–650.
- Schippmann, K. (1987). "Azerbaijan iii. Pre-Islamic History". Encyclopaedia Iranica, Vol. III, Fasc. 2. pp. 221–224.
- Schottky, Martin (1991). "Parther, Meder und Hyrkanier. Eine Untersuchung der dynastischen und geographischen Verflechtungen im Iran des 1. Jhs. n. Chr". Archäo- logische Mitteilungen aus Iran (in German). 24.
- Sellwood, D. (1983). "Adiabene". Encyclopaedia Iranica, Vol. I, Fasc. 5. pp. 456–459.
- Settipani, Christian (1991), Nos ancêtres de l'Antiquité (in French), Paris: Editions Christian, p. 89, ISBN 2864960508
- Sullivan, Richard D. (1990), Near Eastern Royalty and Rome, 100-30 BC, Toronto: University of Toronto Press, pp. 299–300, ISBN 978-1-4875-9121-2
- Watson, William (1983). "Iran and China". In Yarshater, Ehsan (ed.). The Cambridge History of Iran: The Seleucid, Parthian and Sasanian Periods. Vol. 3(1). Cambridge: Cambridge University Press. pp. 537–558. ISBN 0-521-20092-X..
- Wang, Tao (2007), "Parthia in China: a Re-examination of the Historical Records", in Curtis, Vesta Sarkhosh and Sarah Stewart (ed.), The Age of the Parthians: The Ideas of Iran, vol. 2, London & New York: I.B. Tauris & Co Ltd., in association with the London Middle East Institute at SOAS and the British Museum, pp. 87–104, ISBN 978-1-84511-406-0.
- Wood, Frances (2002), The Silk Road: Two Thousand Years in the Heart of Asia, Berkeley and Los Angeles: University of California Press, ISBN 978-0-520-24340-8.
- Yü, Ying-shih (1986), "Han Foreign Relations", in Twitchett, Denis and Michael Loewe (ed.), Cambridge History of China: the Ch'in and Han Empires, 221 B.C. – A.D. 220, vol. 1, Cambridge: Cambridge University Press, pp. 377–462, ISBN 978-0-521-24327-8.

Artabanus II of Parthia Arsacid dynasty Died: 38/41
Preceded by Vonones I (predecessor); Tiridates III (rival king)	King of the Parthian Empire; 12–38/41	Succeeded by Vardanes I
