= 170s BC =

Decade

This article concerns the period 179 BC – 170 BC.

== Events ==
=== 179 BC ===
==== By place ====
====== Roman Republic ======
- Tiberius Sempronius Gracchus goes to Hispania as Roman governor to deal with uprisings there.
- The Pons Aemilius is completed across the Tiber River in Rome. It is regarded as the world's first stone bridge.
- Marcus Aemilius Lepidus is appointed both censor and princeps senatus.

====== Greece ======
- Philip V of Macedon dies at Amphipolis in Macedonia, remorseful for having put his younger son Demetrius to death, at the instigation of his older son Perseus. Nevertheless, he is succeeded by his son Perseus.

====== Asia Minor ======
- Eumenes II of Pergamum defeats Pharnaces I of Pontus in a major battle. Finding himself unable to cope with the combined forces of Eumenes and Ariarathes IV of Cappadocia, Pharnaces is compelled to purchase peace by ceding all his conquests in Galatia and Paphlagonia, with the exception of Sinope.

=== 178 BC ===
==== By place ====
====== Roman Republic ======
- In Rome, the praetor Lucius Postumius Albinus celebrates a triumph after conquering the Vaccaei and Lusitani during his time as Roman commander in the province of Hispania Ulterior.

====== Greece ======
- One of Perseus' first acts on becoming king of Macedonia is to renew the treaty between Macedonia and Rome. In the meantime, Perseus builds up the Macedonian army and puts out feelers for creating an alliance with the Greek leagues, with his northern barbarian neighbours, and also with the Seleucid king Seleucus IV.

=== 177 BC ===
==== By place ====
====== Greece ======
- Perseus of Macedonia marries Laodice, the daughter of the Seleucid king Seleucus IV.

====== Roman Republic ======
- After two military campaigns, the Romans finally subdue the Illyrian tribe of the Histri.
- Luni in northern Italy is founded by the Romans with the name Luna at the mouth of the Magra River.

=== 176 BC ===
==== By place ====
====== Roman Republic ======
- The Roman general, Tiberius Sempronius Gracchus, subdues Sardinia, enslaving some of the population.

====== Egypt ======
- Cleopatra I Syra dies leaving her son, Ptolemy VI, to rule Egypt alone.

====== Parthia ======
- King Phriapatius of Parthia dies and is succeeded by his son Phraates I.

=== 175 BC ===
==== By place ====
====== Seleucid Empire ======
- King Seleucus IV of Syria arranges for the exchange of his brother Antiochus for Demetrius, the son of Seleucus IV, who has been a hostage in Rome following the Treaty of Apamea in 188 BC. However, Seleucus IV is assassinated by his chief minister Heliodorus who then seizes the Syrian throne.
- Antiochus manages to oust Heliodorus and takes advantage of Demetrius' captivity in Rome to seize the throne for himself under the name Antiochus IV Epiphanes.
- During this period of uncertainty in Syria, the Egyptian ruler, Ptolemy VI, lays claim to Coele Syria, Palestine, and Phoenicia, which the Seleucid king Antiochus III has previously conquered. Both the Syrian and Egyptian parties appeal to Rome for help, but the Roman Senate refuses to take sides.
- Timarchus is appointed governor of Media in western Persia by Antiochus IV to deal with the growing threat from the Parthians while Timarchus' brother, Heracleides, becomes minister of the royal finances.

==== By topic ====
====== Art ======
- The construction of the western front of the altar in Pergamum, Turkey, begins (approximate date) and is finished in 156 BC. A reconstruction of it is now kept at the Pergamon Museum in Berlin.

=== 174 BC ===
==== By place ====
====== Rome ======
- The first street pavements were laid in Rome.

====== Mongolia ======
- The Xiongnu attack the Yuezhi, and force them away from Gansu.

=== 173 BC ===
==== By place ====
====== Egypt ======
- Ptolemy VI Philometor marries his sister, Cleopatra II.

====== Roman Republic ======
- Dedication of the Temple of Fortuna Equestris.

====== Seleucid Empire ======
- Antiochus IV pays the remainder of the war indemnity that has been imposed by the Romans on Antiochus III in the Treaty of Apamea (188 BC).

=== 172 BC ===
==== By place ====
====== Greece ======
- Eumenes II of Pergamum travels to Rome to warn the Roman Senate of the danger from Perseus of Macedon. On his return from Rome, Eumenes II is nearly killed at Delphi and Perseus is suspected of being the instigator.

====== Seleucid Empire ======
- Since the reign of the Seleucid king, Antiochus III, the Jewish inhabitants of Judea enjoy extensive autonomy under their high priest. However, they are divided into two parties, the orthodox Hasideans (Pious Ones) and a reform party that favours Hellenism. Antiochus IV supports the reform party because of the financial support they provide him with. In return for a considerable payment, he has permitted the high priest, Jason, to build a gymnasium in Jerusalem and to introduce the Greek mode of educating young people. Jason's time as high priest is brought to an abrupt end when he sends Menelaus, the brother of Simon the Benjamite, to deliver money to Antiochus IV. Menelaus takes this opportunity to "outbid" Jason for the priesthood, resulting in Antiochus IV confirming Menelaus as the High Priest.

====== Carthage ======
- The peace treaty at the end of the Second Punic War requires that all border disputes involving Carthage be arbitrated by the Roman Senate and requires Carthage to get explicit Roman approval before going to war. As a result, envoys from Carthage appear before the Roman Senate to request resolution of a boundary dispute with Numidia. The dispute is decided in Numidia's favour.

=== 171 BC ===
==== By place ====
====== Greece ======
- Epirus joins Macedonia in the latter's fight against Rome. However, the leagues of southern Greece remain neutral.
- Thanks to the efforts of Eumenes II of Pergamum while in Rome, the Romans declare war on Macedonia and send troops to Thessaly, thus beginning the Third Macedonian War. In the resulting Battle of Callicinus the Macedonians, led by their king, Perseus, are victorious over a Roman force led by consul Publius Licinius Crassus.
- Boiotian League dissolved by the Romans.

====== Roman Republic ======
- The first Roman colony outside Italy is founded at Carteia in southern Hispania after Iberian-born descendants of Roman soldiers appear before the Roman Senate to request a town to live in and are given Carteia, which is named Colonia Libertinorum Carteia.
- Lucius Postumius Albinus is sent by Rome as an ambassador to King Masinissa of Numidia, and to the Carthaginians in order to raise troops for the war against Perseus of Macedonia.

====== Parthia ======
- Mithradates I succeeds his brother Phraates I as king of Parthia.

=== 170 BC ===
==== By place ====
====== Greece ======
- In Thessaly, King Perseus of Macedon repulses a Roman army which is commanded by Aulus Hostilius Mancinus. Meanwhile, the Thracian city of Abdera is sacked by Roman and Pergamese troops.

====== Egypt ======
- With the guardians of the young king Ptolemy VI Philometor demanding the return of Coele-Syria to Egyptian control, the Seleucid king, Antiochus IV Epiphanes, decides on a preemptive strike against Egypt and invades the country, conquering all but the city of Alexandria. He is also able to capture Ptolemy VI.
- Antiochus IV decides to let Ptolemy VI continue as king of Egypt, but as his puppet. He does this to minimise any reaction from Rome towards his invasion. Antiochus IV then departs Egypt to deal with disturbances in Palestine, but he safeguards his access to Egypt with a strong garrison in Pelusium.
- With Antiochus IV now absent from the country, the citizens of Alexandria choose Ptolemy VI's brother Ptolemy VIII Euergetes II as their king. The two Ptolemy brothers agree to rule Egypt jointly with their sister Cleopatra II and Coele Syria is invaded by the Egyptian forces.

====== Seleucid Empire ======
- The usurped high priest of Judea, Jason, does not abandon his claims to being the high priest which he has lost to Menelaus two years earlier. While Antiochus IV is waging war against Egypt, he succeeds in making himself master of Jerusalem once more and forces Menelaus to seek refuge in the citadel.

====== Bactria ======
- Around this time, Eucratides, who is either a rebellious Bactrian official or a cousin of the Seleucid king Antiochus IV Epiphanes, captures the throne of the Greco-Bactrian Kingdom by toppling the Euthydemid dynasty's king Antimachus I.

== Births ==
179 BC

- Dong Zhongshu, Chinese scholar who is traditionally associated with the promotion of Confucianism as the official ideology of the Chinese imperial state (d. 104 BC)
- Liu An, Chinese prince, geographer, and cartographer (d. 122 BC)
- Sima Xiangru, Chinese statesman, poet, and musician (d. 117 BC)

173 BC

- Antiochus V Eupator, ruler of the Seleucid Empire from 164 BC (d. 162 BC)
- Wang Zhi, Chinese empress of the Han dynasty (d. 126 BC)

170 BC

- Dionysios Thrax, a Hellenic grammarian who will live and work in Alexandria and later on Rhodes (d. 90 BC)
- Lucius Accius (or Lucius Attius), Roman tragic poet and literary scholar (d. c. 86 BC)
- Apollonia Senmothis, Greek-Egyptian businesswoman.

== Deaths ==
179 BC

- Liu Xiang, Chinese prince involved in the Lü Clan Disturbance in 180 BC and grandson of Emperor Gao of Han
- Philip V, king of Macedonia from 221 BC, whose attempt to extend Macedonian influence throughout Greece has occurred at a time of growing Roman involvement in Greek affairs and resulted in his military defeat by Rome (b. 238 BC)

178 BC

- Chen Ping, Chinese official and chancellor of the Western Han dynasty
- Fu Sheng (Master Fu), Chinese Confucian scholar and writer (b. 268 BC)
- Liu Jiao, Chinese prince and younger brother of Emperor Gaozu of Han

177 BC

- Liu Xingju, Chinese prince of the Han dynasty and a key player during the Lü Clan Disturbance (180 BC), grandson of Emperor Gao of Han and son of Prince Liu Fei of Qi
- Liu Zhang, Chinese prince of the Han dynasty and a key figure in the anti-Lü clan conspiracy during the Lü Clan Disturbance of 180 BC

176 BC

- Cleopatra I Syra, queen of Egypt from 193 BC, wife of Ptolemy V Epiphanes and regent for her young son, Ptolemy VI Philometor (b. c. 204 BC)
- Phriapatius, king of Parthia

175 BC

- Quintus Caecilius Metellus, Roman consul and dictator (b. c. 250 BC)
- Seleucus IV Philopator, king of the Seleucid dynasty, who has ruled since 187 BC (b. c. 217 BC)
- Cleopatra I of Egypt, mother of Ptolemy VI.

174 BC

- Mete Khan, emperor and founder of the Xiongnu Empire, who has united various Hun confederations under his rule (b. 234 BC)
- Publius Aelius Paetus, Roman consul and censor
- Titus Quinctius Flamininus, Roman general and statesman whose skillful diplomacy has enabled him to establish a Roman protectorate over Greece (b. c. 227 BC) (approximate date)

173 BC

- Lucius Cornelius Lentulus, Roman consul and general

172 BC

- Quintus Fulvius Flaccus, Roman consul and general
- Xiahou Ying, Chinese official and minister coachman

171 BC

- Phraates I, King of Parthia, who has ruled the country since 176 BC
