= Phraates I =

2nd-century BC Parthian king

Phraates I 𐭐𐭓𐭇𐭕
- Arsaces
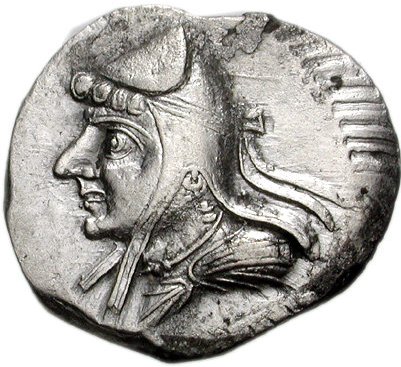
- Coin of a Parthian ruler, possibly Phraates I. Minted at Hekatompylos between 185–132 BC

King of the Arsacid dynasty
- Reign: 170/168–165/64 BC
- Predecessor: Priapatius or Arsaces IV
- Successor: Mithridates I
- Died: 165/64 BC
- Dynasty: Arsacid dynasty
- Father: Priapatius
- Religion: Zoroastrianism

Phraates I (Parthian: 𐭐𐭓𐭇𐭕, romanized: Frahāt) or Arsaces V was king of the Arsacid dynasty from 170/168 BC to 165/64 BC. He subdued the Amardi, conquered their territory in the Alborz mountains, and reclaimed Hyrcania from the Seleucid Empire. He died in 165/64 BC, and was succeeded by his brother Mithridates I (r. 165 – 132 BC), whom he had appointed his heir.

== Name ==
Phraátēs (Φραάτης) is the Greek transliteration of the Parthian name Frahāt (Parthian: 𐭐𐭓𐭇𐭕), itself from Old Iranian *Frahāta- ("gained, earned"). The Modern Persian version is Farhād (فرهاد).

== Background ==
Phraates was the eldest son of the Parthian monarch Priapatius (r. 191 – 176 BC), who was the nephew of Arsaces II. Phraates had three other brothers, Mithridates, Bagasis and Artabanus. New epigraphic evidence from Nisa suggests that Priapatius following his death in 170 BC may have been succeeded by an obscure figure named Arsaces IV, who briefly ruled for two years. However, this is rejected by the historian Marek Jan Olbrycht, who calls it "sheer speculation". Since the defeat of Arsaces II against the Greek Seleucid Empire in 208, the Parthians had been their subordinate ally. However, with the decline of the Seleucids in the 180s BC, the Parthians were able to reassert much of their former autonomy.

== Reign ==
At the start of 165 BC, Phraates attacked the powerful Mardians (also known as Amardians), a group of people who lived in Alborz mountains, which bordered Hyrcania in the east and Media in the southwest. Owing to their geographical position, the Mardians were able to pose a threat to the trade routes stretching from Hyrcania and western Parthia to western Iran. The attack was probably part of the Parthian efforts to expand their domain in Iran proper and secure control over Hyrcania. The main aspiration of the Parthians was to conquer Media, starting with Media Rhagiane. Phraates' attack on the Mardians was successful, conquering the Caspian Gates, as well as the city of Charax, which was close to the Median metropolis of Rhaga. Furthermore, he also reclaimed Hyrcania from the Seleucids. He had a group of Mardians deported to Charax to protect the Caspian Gates, and the Tapurians in Parthia deported to the Caspian coast, which gave rise to the name of the historical region Tabaristan. Phraates' conquests paved the way for his successors to further expand the Parthian realm.

Phraates' western expansion was a transgression of the traditional status quo between the Parthians and Seleucids. During this period, the Seleucids were occupied in Judea, which suggests that Phraates deliberately mounted his campaign during a time where the Seleucids were unable to respond. The Seleucid king Antiochus IV (r. 175 – 164 BC) left Judea to prepare to mount a retaliation campaign against the Parthians, but died near Gabae at the end of 164 BC, probably due to disease. His successor, the nine-year-old Antiochus V Eupator (r. 164 – 161 BC) was unable to focus on the Parthians, as his reign was marked by conflict, political intrigue, and Roman influence.

Phraates notably appointed his brother Mithridates as his successor. It was common amongst Central Asian nomads for a ruler to be succeeded by his brother instead of his son. This practice may have survived amongst the Arsacids, owing to their nomadic origins. A passage by the 2nd-century Roman historian Justin suggests that Priapatius had chosen Mithridates as the successor of Phraates. Olbrycht supports this theory, stating that Phraates was by himself not in a position to choose his brother over his sons, due to his short reign. Justin reports that the interests of the country was of higher importance to Phraates I than that of his sons, which indicates that he supported the decision made by his father regarding the succession. Phraates I died in 165 or 164 BC, and was succeeded by Mithridates I.

== Coinage ==
The coins minted under Phraates were identical to that of his predecessors. The obverse depicts the Arsacid monarch, who is beardless, and wearing a soft cap, known as the kyrbasia, which had also been worn by Achaemenid satraps. On the reverse, there is a seated archer, dressed in an Iranian riding costume.

== Sources ==
- Brunner, Christopher (1983). "Geographical and Administrative divisions: Settlements and Economy". In Yarshater, Ehsan (ed.). The Cambridge History of Iran: The Seleucid, Parthian and Sasanian Periods. Vol. 3(2). Cambridge: Cambridge University Press. pp. 747–778. ISBN 0-521-24693-8.
- Curtis, Vesta Sarkhosh (2012). "Parthian coins: Kingship and Divine Glory". The Parthian Empire and its Religions. pp. 67–83. ISBN 978-3-940598-13-4.
- Ellerbrock, Uwe (2021). The Parthians: The Forgotten Empire. Oxford: Routledge. ISBN 978-0-367-48190-2.
- Minorsky, Vladimir; Bosworth, C. E. & Vasmer, R (1991). "Māzandarān". In Bosworth, C. E.; van Donzel, E. & Pellat, Ch. (eds.). The Encyclopaedia of Islam, Second Edition. Volume VI: Mahk–Mid. Leiden: E. J. Brill. ISBN 978-90-04-08112-3.
- Olbrycht, Marek Jan (2021). Early Arsakid Parthia (ca. 250-165 B.C.). Brill. ISBN 978-90-04-46075-1.
- Overtoom, Nikolaus Leo (2020). Reign of Arrows: The Rise of the Parthian Empire in the Hellenistic Middle East. Oxford: Oxford University Press. ISBN 978-0-19-088832-9.
- Kia, Mehrdad (2016). The Persian Empire: A Historical Encyclopedia [2 volumes]. ABC-CLIO. ISBN 978-1-61069-391-2.
- Rezakhani, Khodadad (2013). "Arsacid, Elymaean, and Persid Coinage". In Potts, Daniel T. (ed.). The Oxford Handbook of Ancient Iran. Oxford University Press. ISBN 978-0-19-973330-9.
- Strootman, Rolf (2017). "Imperial Persianism: Seleukids, Arsakids and Fratarakā". In Strootman, Rolf; Versluys, Miguel John (eds.). Persianism in Antiquity. Franz Steiner Verlag. pp. 177–201. ISBN 978-3-515-11382-3.
- Schmitt, Rüdiger (2005). "Personal Names, Iranian iv. Parthian Period". In Yarshater, Ehsan (ed.). Encyclopædia Iranica (Online ed.). Encyclopædia Iranica Foundation.
- Sinisi, Fabrizio (2012). "The Coinage of the Parthians". In Metcalf, William E. (ed.). The Oxford Handbook of Greek and Roman Coinage. Oxford University Press. ISBN 978-0-19-530574-6.

Phraates I Arsacid dynasty Died: 165/64 BC
Preceded by Priapatius or Arsaces IV	King of Parthia; 170/168–165/64 BC	Succeeded by Mithridates I
