= Priapatius =

Arsacid king of Parthia from 191 BC to 176 BC

Priapatius 𐭐𐭓𐭉𐭐𐭕
- Arsaces
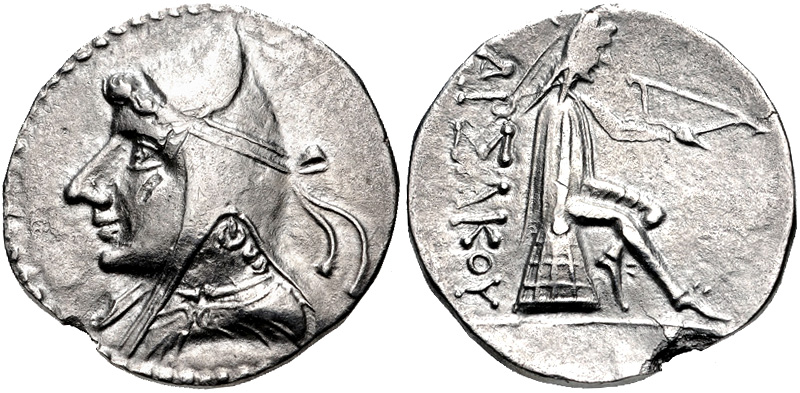
- Coin of Priapatius, Hekatompylos mint

King of the Arsacid dynasty
- Reign: 191–176 BC
- Predecessor: Arsaces II
- Successor: Phraates I
- Died: 176 BC
- Issue: Phraates I Mithridates I Artabanus I Bagasis
- Dynasty: Arsacid dynasty
- Father: Nephew of Arsaces I
- Religion: Zoroastrianism

Priapatius (also spelled Phriapatius or Phriapites; Parthian: 𐭐𐭓𐭉𐭐𐭕, romanized: Friyapat), sometimes Arsaces III was the Arsacid king of Parthia from 191 BC to 176 BC. He was the first-cousin-once-removed and successor of Arsaces II (r. 217 – 191 BC). Like many Arsacid monarchs, his reign is sparsely known. His coinage indicates that he managed to rid himself of the influence of the Seleucid Empire. He was succeeded by his son Phraates I.

== Background ==
According to the modern historian Mehrdad Kia, Priapatius was most likely the son of his predecessor, Arsaces II (r. 217 – 191 BC), who was in turn the son of Arsaces I (r. 247 – 217 BC), the founder of the dynasty. However, this is unlikely, as newly found contemporary Parthian ostracons call him a son of the nephew of Arsaces I. Efforts have been made by scholars to reconstruct the early genealogy of the Arsacids, which calls Priapatius the grandson of Tiridates, the brother of Arsaces. However, numismatic data and recent analysis of sources have led to the conclusion that the character of Tiridates is fictional.

== Reign ==
Regardless of his precise ancestry, Priapatius succeeded Arsaces II in 191 BC. Like many Arsacid rulers, not much is known about Priapatius. His coinage in terms of style followed the same model as that of his predecessors. The obverse shows a beardless portrait of him wearing a soft cap (kyrbasia), whilst the reverse shows him carrying a bow. However, changes to the titulary were made on the coinage: the Greek title of BAΣΙΛΕΩΣ (Basileus) was for the first time added and made regular on his coinage, and the title ΜΕΓΑΛΟΥ (Great) was also added.

The adoption of these titles were most likely associated with the Arsacid reconquest of the lands lost to the Seleucid king Antiochus III the Great (r. 222 – 187 BC), who had in 210 BC made a large-scale expedition in the east, including Hyrcania. There, he possibly compelled Arsaces II to abandon his right to mint coins freely. Afterwards, however, the fragility of the Seleucid Empire gave Arsaces II and later Priapatius the opportunity to resume having their coins minted freely. Like the rest of the Arsacid kings, Priapatius used the title of Arsaces on his coinage, which was the name of the first Arsacid ruler Arsaces I (r. 247 – 217 BC), which had become a royal honorific among the Arsacid monarchs out of admiration for his achievements.

Priapatius was the father of three Arsacid kings, Phraates I (r. 176 – 171 BC), who was his oldest son and successor, Mithridates I (r. 171 – 132 BC), and Artabanus I (r. 127 – 124 BC).

== Sources ==
- Dąbrowa, Edward [in Polish] (2012). "The Arsacid Empire". In Daryaee, Touraj (ed.). The Oxford Handbook of Iranian History. Oxford University Press. pp. 1–432. ISBN 978-0-19-987575-7.
- Frye, Richard Nelson (1984). The History of Ancient Iran. C.H.Beck. pp. 1–411. ISBN 9783406093975. "false."
- Kia, Mehrdad (2016). The Persian Empire: A Historical Encyclopedia [2 volumes]. ABC-CLIO. ISBN 978-1610693912.
- Rezakhani, Khodadad (2017). "Arsacid, Elymaean, and Persid coinage". In Potts, Daniel T. (ed.). The Oxford Handbook of Ancient Iran. Oxford University Press. pp. 1–1021. ISBN 9780190668662.

Priapatius Arsacid dynasty Died: 176 BC
| Preceded by Arsaces II | King of Parthia; 191–176 BC | Succeeded by Phraates I |
