= 211 BC =

211 BC in various calendars
Gregorian calendar	211 BC; CCXI BC
Ab urbe condita	543
Ancient Egypt era	XXXIII dynasty, 113
Pharaoh	Ptolemy IV Philopator, 11
Ancient Greek Olympiad (summer)	142nd Olympiad, year 2
Assyrian calendar	4540
Balinese saka calendar	N/A
Bengali calendar	−804 – −803
Berber calendar	740
Buddhist calendar	334
Burmese calendar	−848
Byzantine calendar	5298–5299
Chinese calendar	己丑年 (Earth Ox); 2487 or 2280 — to — 庚寅年 (Metal Tiger); 2488 or 2281
Coptic calendar	−494 – −493
Discordian calendar	956
Ethiopian calendar	−218 – −217
Hebrew calendar	3550–3551
- Hindu calendars
Vikram Samvat	−154 – −153
Shaka Samvat	N/A
Kali Yuga	2890–2891
Holocene calendar	9790
Iranian calendar	832 BP – 831 BP
Islamic calendar	858 BH – 857 BH
Javanese calendar	N/A
Julian calendar	N/A
Korean calendar	2123
Minguo calendar	2122 before ROC 民前2122年
Nanakshahi calendar	−1678
Seleucid era	101/102 AG
Thai solar calendar	332–333
Tibetan calendar	ས་མོ་གླང་ལོ་ (female Earth-Ox) −84 or −465 or −1237 — to — ལྕགས་ཕོ་སྟག་ལོ་ (male Iron-Tiger) −83 or −464 or −1236

Year 211 BC was a year of the pre-Julian Roman calendar. At the time it was known as the Year of the Consulship of Maximus and Maximus (or, less frequently, year 543 Ab urbe condita). The denomination 211 BC for this year has been used since the early medieval period, when the Anno Domini calendar era became the prevalent method in Europe for naming years.

== Events ==
=== By place ===
==== Seleucid Empire ====
- Antiochus III's sister arranges for the removal of Armenia's king Xerxes, whom she has recently married. Antiochus III then divides the country into two satrapies.

==== Carthage ====
- Spring–Hannibal invades Italy.
- The Carthaginian general Hasdrubal Barca returns to Spain after his victory over the rebellious Numidians. He then manages to turn the tide against the Romans in Spain, with the Roman generals Publius Cornelius Scipio and his brother Gnaeus Cornelius Scipio Calvus killed in separate battles—Publius on the upper Baetis (Guadalquivir) and Gnaeus in the hinterland of Carthago Nova (Cartagena). The Carthaginians recover all their territory south of the Ebro.

==== Roman Republic ====
- With the capture of Syracuse, the Romans are able to pacify all of Sicily.
- The Romans besiege the town of Capua (which is allied with Hannibal). The town eventually falls to the Romans and its citizens are punished by them. The town's nobility are put to the sword, its territory is confiscated and its municipal organisation is dissolved.
- Hannibal marches northwards on the city of Rome in a belated and unsuccessful effort to capture the city.
- Rome faces the burdens of inflation and the danger of famine, caused by the disturbed conditions in Italy and Sicily and the withdrawal of so many men from farming. The situation is only relieved by an urgent appeal by the Romans to the King of Egypt, Ptolemy IV, from whom grain is purchased at three times the usual price.

==== Greece ====
- The Roman commander Marcus Valerius Laevinus explores the possibility of an alliance with the Aetolian League as the Aetolians are once again ready to consider taking up arms against their traditional enemy, Macedonia. A treaty is signed to counter Philip V of Macedon who is allied to Hannibal. Under the treaty, the Aetolians are to conduct operations on land, the Romans at sea. Also, Rome will keep any slaves and other booty taken and Aetolia will receive control of any territory acquired.

==== Parthia ====
- Arsaces II succeeds his father Arsaces I as King of Parthia.

== Deaths ==
- Arsaces I, king of Parthia from 250 BC and son of Phriapites, a chief of the seminomadic Parni tribe from the Caspian steppes
- Gnaeus Cornelius Scipio Calvus, Roman general, statesman and brother of Publius Cornelius Scipio
- Manius Pomponius Matho, Roman general, consul and maternal grandfather of Scipio Africanus
- Publius Cornelius Scipio, Roman general, consul and proconsul during the Second Punic War
