= Phraates II =

Phraates II 𐭐𐭓𐭇𐭕
- King of Kings, Arsaces, Philhellene
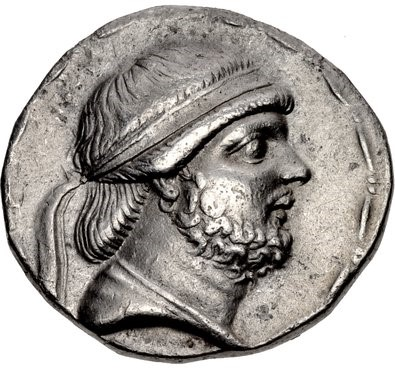
- Tetradrachm of Phraates II, minted at Seleucia

King of the Parthian Empire
- Reign: 132–127 BC
- Predecessor: Mithridates I
- Successor: Artabanus I
- Born: c. 147 BC
- Died: 127 BC (aged 19 or 20)
- Spouse: Laodice
- Dynasty: Arsacid dynasty
- Father: Mithridates I
- Mother: Rinnu
- Religion: Zoroastrianism

Phraates II (also spelled Frahad II; Parthian: 𐭐𐭓𐭇𐭕 Frahāt) was king of the Parthian Empire from 132 BC to 127 BC. He was the son and successor of Mithridates I (r. 171–132 BC).

Because he was still very young when he came to the throne, his mother Rinnu initially ruled on his behalf. His short reign was mainly marked by his war with the Seleucid Empire, which under king Antiochus VII Sidetes (r. 138–129 BC) attempted to regain the lands lost to Phraates' father. Initially unsuccessful in the conflict, Phraates II managed to gain the upper hand and defeated Antiochus VII's forces, with the Seleucid ruler himself dying in battle or committing suicide. Phraates II afterwards rushed to the east to repel an invasion by nomadic tribes—the Saka and Yuezhi, where he met his end. He was succeeded by his uncle Artabanus I.

== Name ==
Phraátēs (Φραάτης) is the Greek form of the Parthian Frahāt (𐭐𐭓𐭇𐭕), itself from the Old Iranian *Frahāta- ("gained, earned"). The Modern Persian version is Farhād (فرهاد).

== Background ==
Phraates II was born in c. 147 BC; he was the son of Mithridates I, the fifth Parthian king, and a noblewoman named Rinnu, who was the daughter of a Median magnate.

== Early reign and policy ==
Phraates succeeded his father in 132 BC; due to still being a minor, his mother ruled with him for a few months. Around this period, Phraates gave Darayan I kingship over the southern Iranian region of Persis. He also defeated and captured the ruler of Elymais Tigraios and appointed Kamnaskires the Younger to the throne of Elymais as a Parthian vassal. Continuing his father's plan, Phraates II had intentions to conquer Syria, and planned to use his captive—the former Seleucid king Demetrius II Nicator—as an instrument against his brother—the new Seleucid king Antiochus VII Sidetes (r. 138–129 BC). According to the 2nd-century Roman historian Justin, Demetrius attempted to escape captivity twice, both times during the reign of Phraates. The first attempt occurred after Mithridates I's death, with the second attempt happening a few years after:

Following his [Mithradates I's] death, despairing of [ever] returning [home], Demetrios, who did not bear his captivity, and was weary of a life, albeit opulent, as a private person, contemplated in secret a flight to (his) kingdom. […] But Phrahates, who had succeeded to Arsaces [Mithradates I], brought back the fugitive [Demetrios], who had been overtaken by the rapidity of the horsemen. Being taken to the king… he [the king] sent Demetrios, severely chastised, back to his wife in Hyrcania, and ordered that he be kept in confinement. Then, time having gone by… he [Demetrios] took flight again with the same friend as companion, with equal misfortune, he was seized near the borders of his kingdom, and conducted again to the king who regarded him with ill will; he was removed from his presence. Thereupon, as a grant to his wife and children he was sent back to Hyrcania, the city of his [former] imprisonment…

— Justin, Epitome of the Philippic History of Pompeius Trogus, 38.9.4–9

== War with Antiochus VII ==
Map of Babylonia and its surroundings in the 2nd-century BC

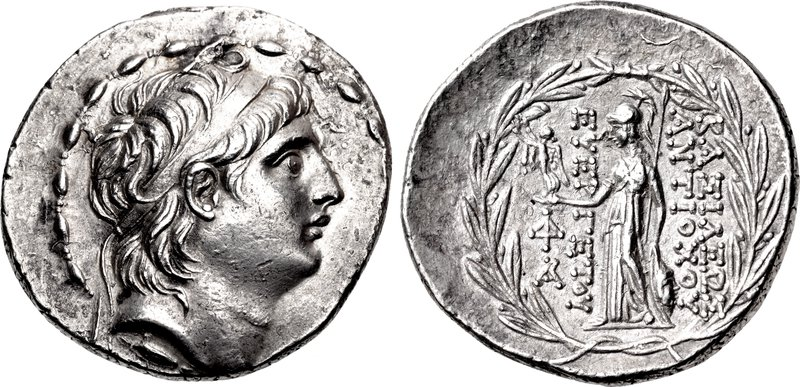
Coin of Antiochus VII Sidetes, king (basileus) of the Seleucid Empire

Antiochus, well-aware of Phraates II's plan to use his brother against him, invaded the Parthian realm in 130 BC to thwart it. He was reportedly well received by many magnates, who joined him. After three battles he reclaimed Babylonia. At the same time, the eastern Parthian frontier was invaded by nomads. Antiochus' forces wintered in Parthian territory; before spring, he entered into negotiations with Phraates II. Self-confident after his victories, Antiochus demanded not only the release of Demetrius, but also the return of the all lost lands and renewal of tribute fees. Phraates II, offended by the reply, broke off the negotiations and prepared for battle.

Whilst wintering, Antiochus VII quartered himself and his army in either Babylonia or Media, where he completely alienated the local people by forcing them to pay for the upkeep of his soldiers and because, it seems, the soldiers assaulted the locals. Thus, when Phraates II attacked the Seleucid army in its winter quarters during the spring of 129 BC, the local population supported him. Antiochus was defeated and died, either in battle or by committing suicide, ending Seleucid rule east of the Euphrates. Phraates, relishing over the death of Antiochus, is reported to have said the following before the latter's corpse: "Your boldness and drunkenness, Antiochus, caused your fall; for you expected to drink up the kingdom of Arsaces in huge cups."

Phraates II succeeded in capturing Seleucus and Laodice, two of Antiochus' children who had accompanied their father on campaign. Phraates II later married Laodice and showed Seleucus (not to be confused with his cousin Seleucus V) great favour. He allowed Antiochus a royal funeral and later returned the body to Syria in a silver coffin along with Seleucus. Phraates II also released Demetrius, who had been held by the Parthians as a hostage for several years, to become king of the Seleucid realm for a second time.

Syria, which was now all that was left of the Seleucid empire, lacked military power and Phraates II apparently planned to invade it. However, on the eastern front, various nomadic tribes already infiltrating and usurping the Saka and Tokhari destroyed the Greco-Bactrian Kingdom, penetrated to the borders of the realm in 129 BC, and threatened the Parthian realm. The king had to rush to the eastern front, installing Himeros as governor of Babylon, who quickly became a tyrant. Phraates II marched east, his army including a large force of captured Seleucid soldiers from the army of the late Antiochus. These soldiers ultimately refused to fight for the Parthian king, and he was defeated and killed in battle.

== Coinage and Imperial ideology ==
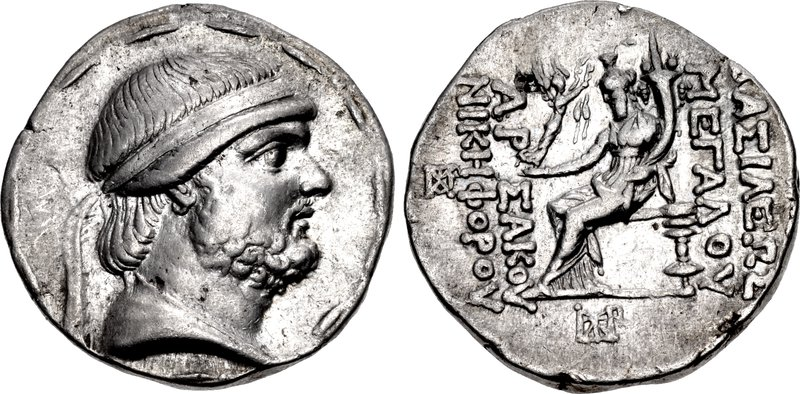
Coin of Phraates II

Phraates refrained from using the title of "King of Kings" in his coinage, and instead used the title of "great king". Like the rest of the Parthian kings, he used the title of Arsaces on his coinage, which was the name of the first Parthian ruler Arsaces I (r. 247 – 217 BC) and had become a royal honorific among the Parthian monarchs out of admiration for his achievements.

Furthermore, he also used the title of Philhellene ("friend of the Greeks"), which had been introduced during the reign of his father Mithridates I (r. 171 – 132 BC) as a political act in order to establish friendly relations with their Greek subjects. An unusual title attested during the reign of Phraates was the title of "King of the Lands" (attested in Babylonian cuneiform tablets as šar mātāti), which was rarely used by the Seleucid monarchs. Like his father, Phraates is depicted on coins wearing a Hellenistic diadem, whilst his beard represents the traditional Iranian/Near Eastern custom.

== Bibliography ==
=== Ancient works ===
- Justin, Epitome of the Philippic History of Pompeius Trogus.

=== Modern works ===
- Assar, Gholamreza F. (2006). "A Revised Parthian Chronology of the Period 91-55 BC". Parthica. Incontri di Culture Nel Mondo Antico. 8. Istituti Editoriali e Poligrafici Internazionali. ISBN 978-8-881-47453-0. ISSN 1128-6342.
- Assar, Gholamreza F. (2009). "Artabanus of Trogus Pompeius' 41st Prologue". Electrum. 15. Kraków.
- Bing, D.; Sievers, J. (1986). "Antiochus". Encyclopaedia Iranica, Vol. II, Fasc. 2. pp. 125–135.
- Brown, Stuart C. (1997). "Ecbatana". Encyclopaedia Iranica, Vol. VIII, Fasc. 1. pp. 80–84.
- Bickerman, Elias J. (1983). "The Seleucid Period". In Yarshater, Ehsan (ed.). The Cambridge History of Iran: The Seleucid, Parthian and Sasanian Periods. Vol. 3(1). Cambridge: Cambridge University Press. pp. 3–20. ISBN 0-521-20092-X.
- Bivar, A.D.H. (1983). "The Political History of Iran under the Arsacids". In Yarshater, Ehsan (ed.). The Cambridge History of Iran: The Seleucid, Parthian and Sasanian Periods. Vol. 3(1). Cambridge: Cambridge University Press. pp. 21–99. ISBN 0-521-20092-X.
- Brosius, Maria (2006), The Persians: An Introduction, London & New York: Routledge, ISBN 0-415-32089-5
- Curtis, Vesta Sarkhosh; Stewart, Sarah, eds. (2007), The Age of the Parthians, Ideas of Iran, vol. 2, London: I. B. Tauris
- Curtis, Vesta Sarkhosh (2007), "The Iranian Revival in the Parthian Period", in Curtis, Vesta Sarkhosh and Sarah Stewart (ed.), The Age of the Parthians: The Ideas of Iran, vol. 2, London & New York: I.B. Tauris & Co Ltd., in association with the London Middle East Institute at SOAS and the British Museum, pp. 7–25, ISBN 978-1-84511-406-0
- Colledge, Malcolm A. R. (1977). Parthian art. Elek. pp. 1–200. ISBN 9780236400850.
- Dąbrowa, Edward (2010). "The Arsacids and their State". In Rollinger, R. (ed.). Altertum und Gegenwart: 125 Jahre alte Geschichte in Innsbruck. Vol. XI. pp. 21–52.
- Dąbrowa, Edward (2013). "The Parthian Aristocracy: its Social Position and Political Activity". Parthica. 15: 53–62.
- Dąbrowa, Edward (2018). "Arsacid Dynastic Marriages" (PDF). Electrum. 25: 73–83. doi:10.4467/20800909EL.18.005.8925.
- Daryaee, Touraj (2012). The Oxford Handbook of Iranian History. Oxford University Press. pp. 1–432. ISBN 978-0-19-987575-7.
- Frye, Richard Nelson (1984). The History of Ancient Iran. C.H.Beck. pp. 1–411. ISBN 9783406093975. "false."
- Garthwaite, Gene Ralph (2005), The Persians, Oxford & Carlton: Blackwell Publishing, Ltd., ISBN 1-55786-860-3
- Grousset, René (1970). The Empire of the Steppes: A History of Central Asia. Rutgers University Press. pp. 1-687. ISBN 9780813513041.
- Invernizzi, Antonio. "Nisa". Encyclopaedia Iranica.
- Kennedy, David (1996), "Parthia and Rome: eastern perspectives", in Kennedy, David L.; Braund, David (eds.), The Roman Army in the East, Ann Arbor: Cushing Malloy Inc., Journal of Roman Archaeology: Supplementary Series Number Eighteen, pp. 67–90, ISBN 1-887829-18-0
- Hansman, John F. (1998). "Elymais". Encyclopaedia Iranica, Vol. VIII, Fasc. 4. pp. 373–376.
- Kia, Mehrdad (2016). The Persian Empire: A Historical Encyclopedia [2 volumes]: A Historical Encyclopedia. ABC-CLIO. ISBN 978-1610693912.
- Kosmin, Paul J. (2014). The Land of the Elephant Kings. Harvard University Press. ISBN 9780674728820.
- Nabel, Jake (2017). "The Seleucids Imprisoned: Arsacid-Roman Hostage Submission and Its Hellenistic Precedents". In Schlude, Jason M.; Rubin, Benjamin B. (eds.). Arcasids, Romans, and Local Elites: Cross-Cultural Interactions of the Parthian Empire. Oxbow Books. pp. 25–50. ISBN 978-1-78570-593-9.
- Olbrycht, Marek Jan (2010). "Mithradates I of Parthia and His Conquests up to 141 B.C.". In Dabrowa, E.; Dzielska, M.; Salamon, M.; Sprawski, S. (eds.). Hortus Historiae: Studies in Honour of Professor Jósef Wolski on the 100th Anniversary of his Birthday. pp. 229–245.
- Overtoom, Nikolaus Leo (2020). Reign of Arrows: The Rise of the Parthian Empire in the Hellenistic Middle East. Oxford University Press. ISBN 9780190888336.
- Pourshariati, Parvaneh (2008). Decline and Fall of the Sasanian Empire: The Sasanian-Parthian Confederacy and the Arab Conquest of Iran. London and New York: I.B. Tauris. ISBN 978-1-84511-645-3.
- Schippmann, K. (1986). "Arsacids ii. The Arsacid dynasty". Encyclopaedia Iranica, Vol. II, Fasc. 5. pp. 525–536.
- Schmitt, Rüdiger (2005). "Personal Names, Iranian iv. Parthian Period". Encyclopaedia Iranica.
- Shayegan, Rahim M. (2007). "On Demetrius II Nicator's Arsacid Captivity and Second Rule". Bulletin of the Asia Institute. 17: 83–103.
- Shayegan, M. Rahim (2011). Arsacids and Sasanians: Political Ideology in Post-Hellenistic and Late Antique Persia. Cambridge University Press. pp. 1–539. ISBN 9780521766418.
- Sellwood, David (1983). "Minor States in Southern Iran". In Yarshater, Ehsan (ed.). The Cambridge History of Iran: The Seleucid, Parthian and Sasanian Periods. Vol. 3(1). Cambridge: Cambridge University Press. pp. 299–322. ISBN 0-521-20092-X.
- Wiesehöfer, Josef (2000). "Frataraka". Encyclopaedia Iranica, Vol. X, Fasc. 2. p. 195.

Phraates II Arsacid dynasty Died: 127 BC
Preceded by Mithridates I	King of the Parthian Empire; 132–127 BC	Succeeded by Artabanus I
