= Artabanus I of Parthia =

Artabanus I 𐭍𐭐𐭕𐭓
- Great King, Arsaces, Philhellene
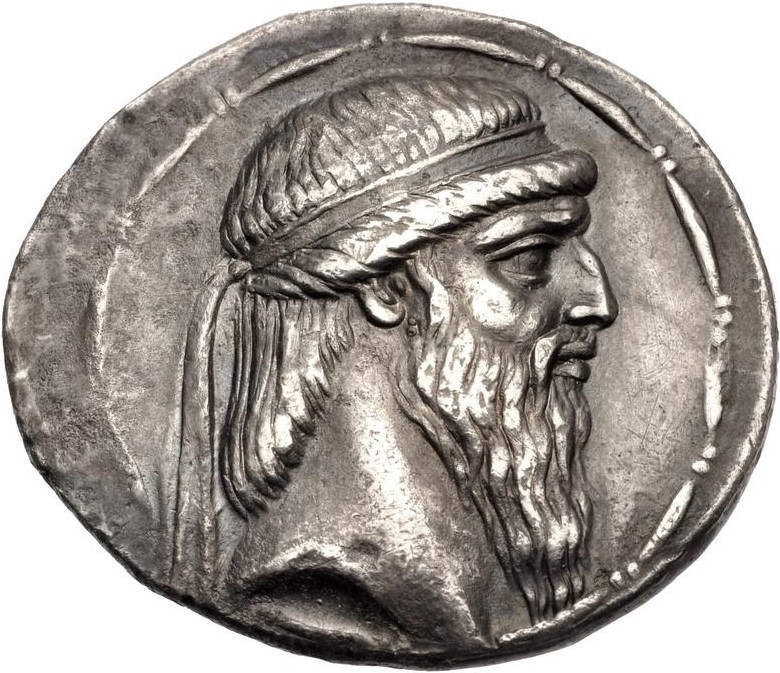
- Coin of Artabanus I, Seleucia mint

King of the Parthian Empire
- Reign: 127 – 124/3 BC
- Predecessor: Phraates II
- Successor: Mithridates II
- Died: 124/3 BC
- Issue: Mithridates II
- Dynasty: Arsacid dynasty
- Father: Priapatius
- Religion: Zoroastrianism

Artabanus I (Parthian: 𐭍𐭐𐭕𐭓 Ardawān), incorrectly known in older scholarship as Artabanus II, was king of the Parthian Empire, ruling briefly from c. 127 to 124/3 BC. (Note: The exact period that Artabanus I reigned is disputed. According to Shayegan (2011, pp. 41–42), his reign was 127-125 BC; Curtis (2007, pp. 11, 15) states 127-124/3 BC; Schippmann (1986a, pp. 647–650) states 127-124/3 BC; Dąbrowa (2012, p. 170) states 126-123/2 BC.) His short reign ended abruptly when he died during a battle against the Yuezhi in the east. He was succeeded by his son Mithridates II.

== Name ==
Artabanus is the Latin form of the Greek Artábanos (Ἁρτάβανος), itself from the Old Persian *Arta-bānu ("the glory of Arta."). The Parthian and Middle Persian variant was Ardawān (𐭍𐭐𐭕𐭓).

== Reign ==
The son of Priapatius, Artabanus I succeeded his nephew Phraates II in 127 BC. Artabanus I must have been relatively old at his accession, due to his father having died in 176 BC. Since the early 2nd century BC, the Arsacids had begun adding obvious signals in their dynastic ideology, which emphasized their association with the heritage of the ancient Iranian Achaemenid Empire. Examples of these signs included a fictitious claim that the first Arsacid king, Arsaces I (r. 247–217 BC) was a descendant of the Achaemenid king of kings, Artaxerxes II (r. 404–358 BC). Achaemenid titles were also assumed by the Arsacids; Artabanus I's brother Mithridates I (r. 171 – 132 BC) was the first Arsacid ruler to adopt the former Achaemenid title of "King of Kings".

However, Artabanus I, like Phraates II, refrained from using the title of "King of Kings", and instead used the title of "Great King". Like the rest of the Parthian kings, he used the title of Arsaces on his coinage, which was the name of the first Parthian ruler Arsaces I (r. 247 – 217 BC), which had become a royal honorific among the Parthian monarchs out of admiration for his achievements. Furthermore, he also used the title of Philhellene ("friend of the Greeks"), which had been introduced during the reign of Mithridates I as part of a policy of maintaining friendly relations with their Greek subjects. The earlier Parthian kings were depicted in Hellenistic clothing on the obverse of their coins; this changed under Artabanus I, who is depicted on his coins wearing the Parthian trouser-suit, which is a testimony of the ongoing Iranian revival under the Parthians. Like his two predecessors, Artabanus I is wearing a Hellenistic diadem, whilst his long beard represents the traditional Iranian/Near Eastern custom.

Artabanus I's reign was a period of decline for the Parthian Empire. His predecessor, Phraates II had died fighting invading nomads in the east of the empire. Artabanus I was also forced to fight the nomads—the Saka and Yuezhi, and was reportedly compelled to pay them tribute. Hyspaosines, who had recently created the principality of Characene in southern Mesopotamia, took advantage of the Parthian difficulties in the east by proclaiming his independence from Parthian suzerainty. He then went on to briefly seize Babylon (c. 127 B.C), and by 125/4 BC, he controlled parts of Mesopotamia as indicated by coin mints of him. Artabanus I chose to remain in the east to deal with the nomads, whom he considered more of a danger. In 124/3 BC, just like Phraates II, Artabanus I died during a battle against the Yuezhi in the east, reportedly from a wound in his arm. He was succeeded by his son Mithridates II, who not only finally dealt with the nomads pressuring the eastern Parthian borders, but also expanded Parthian authority in the west, transforming the Parthian Empire into a superpower.

== Bibliography ==
=== Ancient works ===
- Justin, Epitome of the Philippic History of Pompeius Trogus.

=== Modern works ===
- Curtis, Vesta Sarkhosh (2007), "The Iranian Revival in the Parthian Period", in Curtis, Vesta Sarkhosh and Sarah Stewart (ed.), The Age of the Parthians: The Ideas of Iran, vol. 2, London & New York: I.B. Tauris & Co Ltd., in association with the London Middle East Institute at SOAS and the British Museum, pp. 7–25, ISBN 978-1-84511-406-0.
- Dandamayev, M. A. (1986). "Artabanus (Old Persian proper name)". Encyclopaedia Iranica, Vol. II, Fasc. 6. pp. 646–647.
- Dąbrowa, Edward (2012). "The Arsacid Empire". In Daryaee, Touraj (ed.). The Oxford Handbook of Iranian History. Oxford University Press. pp. 164–186. ISBN 978-0-19-987575-7. Archived from the original on 2019-01-01.
- Frye, Richard Nelson (1984). The History of Ancient Iran. C.H.Beck. pp. 1–411. ISBN 9783406093975. "false."
- Kia, Mehrdad (2016). The Persian Empire: A Historical Encyclopedia [2 volumes]: A Historical Encyclopedia. ABC-CLIO. ISBN 978-1610693912.
- Schippmann, K. (1986a). "Artabanus (Arsacid kings)". Encyclopaedia Iranica, Vol. II, Fasc. 6. pp. 647–650.
- Schippmann, K. (1986b). "Arsacids ii. The Arsacid dynasty". Encyclopaedia Iranica, Vol. II, Fasc. 5. pp. 525–536.
- Shayegan, M. Rahim (2011). Arsacids and Sasanians: Political Ideology in Post-Hellenistic and Late Antique Persia. Cambridge University Press. pp. 1–539. ISBN 9780521766418.

Artabanus I of Parthia Arsacid dynasty Died: 124 BC
Preceded by Phraates II	King of the Parthian Empire; 127–124/3 BC	Succeeded by Mithridates II
