= 176 BC =

176 BC in various calendars
- Gregorian calendar: 176 BC; CLXXVI BC
- Ab urbe condita: 578
- Ancient Egypt era: XXXIII dynasty, 148
- Pharaoh: Ptolemy VI Philometor, 5
- Ancient Greek Olympiad (summer): 151st Olympiad (victor)¹
- Assyrian calendar: 4575
- Balinese saka calendar: N/A
- Bengali calendar: −769 – −768
- Berber calendar: 775
- Buddhist calendar: 369
- Burmese calendar: −813
- Byzantine calendar: 5333–5334
- Chinese calendar: 甲子年 (Wood Rat); 2522 or 2315 — to — 乙丑年 (Wood Ox); 2523 or 2316
- Coptic calendar: −459 – −458
- Discordian calendar: 991
- Ethiopian calendar: −183 – −182
- Hebrew calendar: 3585–3586
- Hindu calendars
- Vikram Samvat: −119 – −118
- Shaka Samvat: N/A
- Kali Yuga: 2925–2926
- Holocene calendar: 9825
- Iranian calendar: 797 BP – 796 BP
- Islamic calendar: 822 BH – 820 BH
- Javanese calendar: N/A
- Julian calendar: N/A
- Korean calendar: 2158
- Minguo calendar: 2087 before ROC 民前2087年
- Nanakshahi calendar: −1643
- Seleucid era: 136/137 AG
- Thai solar calendar: 367–368
- Tibetan calendar: ཤིང་ཕོ་བྱི་བ་ལོ་ (male Wood-Rat) −49 or −430 or −1202 — to — ཤིང་མོ་གླང་ལོ་ (female Wood-Ox) −48 or −429 or −1201

Year 176 BC was a year of the pre-Julian Roman calendar. At the time it was known as the Year of the Consulship of Hispallus/Laevinus and Spurinus (or, less frequently, year 578 Ab urbe condita). The denomination 176 BC for this year has been used since the early medieval period, when the Anno Domini calendar era became the prevalent method in Europe for naming years.

== Events ==
=== By place ===
==== Roman Republic ====
- The Roman general, Tiberius Sempronius Gracchus, subdues Sardinia, enslaving some of the population.

==== Egypt ====
- Cleopatra I Syra dies leaving her son, Ptolemy VI, to rule Egypt alone.

==== Parthia ====
- King Phriapatius of Parthia dies and is succeeded by his son Phraates I.

== Deaths ==
- Cleopatra I Syra, queen of Egypt from 193 BC, wife of Ptolemy V Epiphanes and regent for her young son, Ptolemy VI Philometor (b. c. 204 BC)
- Phriapatius, king of Parthia
