= Himeros (disambiguation) =

Himeros is the Greek mythological personification of lust and romantic longing.

Himeros may refer to:

- Himeros (Parthian), a Persian military officer
- Himeros (crater), an impact crater on the asteroid 433 Eros
- Papilio himeros (P. himeros), a species of butterfly
