= Asaak =

Ancient city, one of the capitals of the Parthian Empire

Asaak, Arsacia (Latin) or Arshak (Parthian) was an ancient city which was a capital and royal necropolis of the Parthian Empire. Many of the Parthian kings such as Arsaces I were crowned in Asaak.

Some have suggested it to be identified with the Old City near Quchan, Iran in the upper Atrek River valley.

== Sources ==
- Daryaee, Touraj (2012). The Oxford Handbook of Iranian History. Oxford University Press. ISBN 978-0-19-987575-7. Archived from the original on 2019-01-01.
- Schippmann, K. (1986). "Arsacids ii. The Arsacid dynasty". Encyclopaedia Iranica, Vol. II, Fasc. 5. pp. 525–536.
