= Rhodogune of Parthia =

Parthian princess

Rhodogune
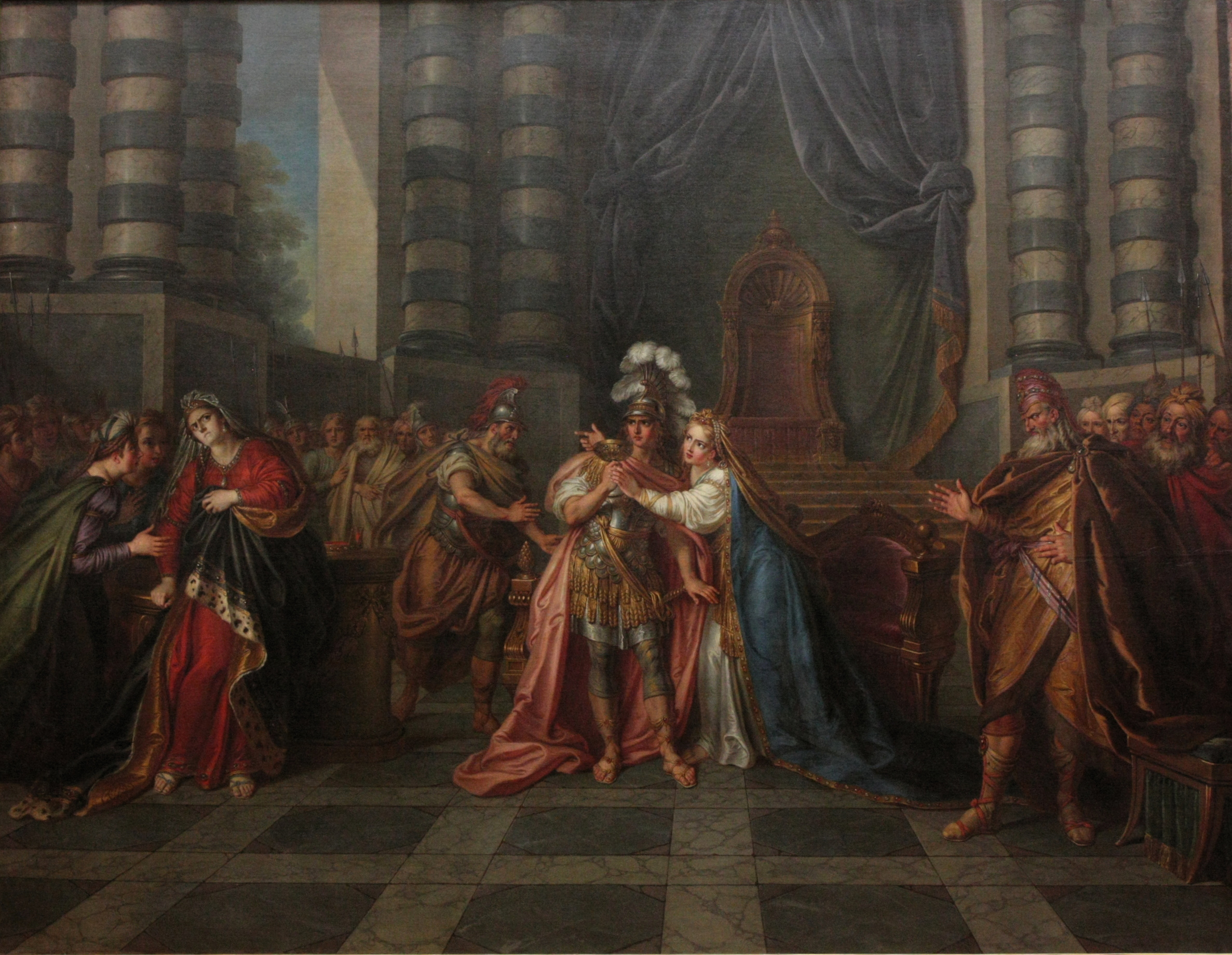
- Anachronistic painting of Rhodogune with Cleopatra II of Egypt by the 18th-century French painter Charles-Antoine Coypel. The Seleucid ruler Antiochus VIII Grypus is to the far right.
- Spouse: Demetrius II Nicator
- Dynasty: Arsacid
- Father: Mithridates I
- Religion: Zoroastrianism

Rhodogune (Ancient Greek: Ῥοδογούνη; 2nd century BCE) was a queen of the Seleucid Empire by marriage to Demetrius II Nicator. She was the daughter of the Parthian king Mithridates I (171-132 BCE), and sister of Phraates II (ruled 132-127 BCE).

== Life ==
In 138 BCE Rhodogune married Seleucid King Demetrius II Nicator (ruled 146-139 BCE, 129-126 BCE). They were kept by her brother in Hyrcania on the shores of the Caspian Sea, during which time they had several children. During their marriage, Demetrius was temporarily a hostage in the Parthian court after an ill-fated campaign in Babylonia.

Polyaenus wrote that Rhodogune, upon learning of a revolt while preparing for a bath, vowed not to bathe or brush her hair until the uprising was suppressed. She immediately led her army into battle and defeated the rebels. Thereafter, she was depicted on the seals of the kings of Persia with long, disheveled hair, in accordance with her vow. This incident is also mentioned in the anonymously written Tractatus de mulieribus, which elaborates further on the story, describing her as being depicted with a golden statue showing her hair half-braided, half unbraided.

She was presumably abandoned in 129 BCE when Demetrius, after numerous failed attempts to escape from Parthia, was dispatched back to Antioch during the invasion of Parthia by Demetrius's brother, Antiochus VII Sidetes.

== Sources ==
- Schmitt, Rüdiger (2017). "Rhodogune". Encyclopaedia Iranica.
