= Arsaces I of Parthia =

First king of Parthia

Arsaces I 𐭀𐭓𐭔𐭊
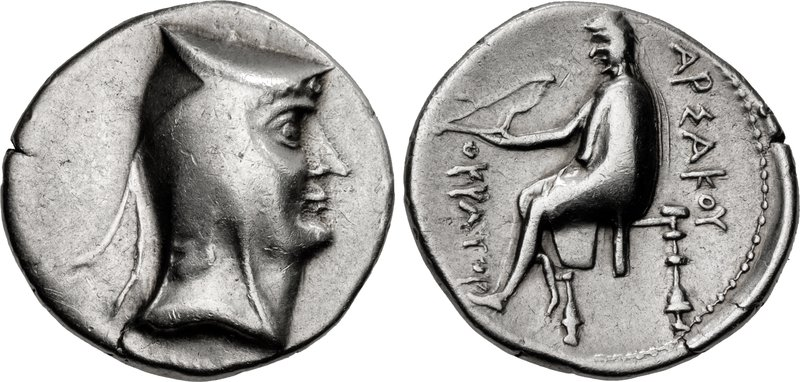
- Coin of Arsaces I. The reverse shows a seated archer carrying a bow, with the Greek legend reading "ΑΡΣΑΚΟΥ" (right) and "[AYT]OKPATOP[OΣ]" (left), meaning [coin of] "Arsaces autocrator".

King of the Arsacid dynasty
- Reign: 247 – 217 BC
- Successor: Arsaces II
- Died: 217 BC; Parthia
- Issue: Arsaces II
- Father: Phriapites
- Religion: Zoroastrianism

Arsaces I (/ˈɑːrsəsiːz/; Ancient Greek: Ἀρσάκης; Parthian: 𐭀𐭓𐭔𐭊, romanized: Aršak) was the first king of Parthia, ruling from 247 to 217 BC, as well as the founder and eponym of its ruling Arsacid dynasty. The leader of the Parni, one of the three Scythiantribes of the Dahae confederacy, Arsaces founded his dynasty in the mid-3rd century BC when he conquered the satrapy of Parthia (now shared between Turkmenistan and Iran) from Andragoras, who had rebelled against the Seleucid Empire. He spent the rest of his reign consolidating his rule in the region, and successfully stopped the Seleucid efforts to reconquer Parthia. Due to Arsaces' achievements, he became a popular figure amongst the Arsacid monarchs, who used his name as a royal honorific. By the time of his death, Arsaces had laid the foundations of a strong state, which would eventually transform into an empire under his great-grandnephew, Mithridates I, who assumed the ancient Near Eastern royal title of King of Kings. Arsaces was succeeded by his son Arsaces II.

Literary sources are very scarce on Arsaces, and exclusively come from contradictory Greek and Roman accounts written centuries after his death. As a result, his reign is sparsely known. His existence was even questioned by modern scholars, until new studies and archaeological findings confirmed his identity in the 1960s.

== Name ==
Arsacēs is the Latin form of the Greek Arsákēs (Ἀρσάκης), itself from Parthian Aršak (Parthian: 𐭀𐭓𐭔𐭊). The name is diminutive of Old Iranian R̥šan, meaning "hero". The name was also used by some of the rulers of the Persian Achaemenid Empire, including Artaxerxes II (r. 404 – 358 BC), whom the Arsacids considered their progenitor.

== Background ==
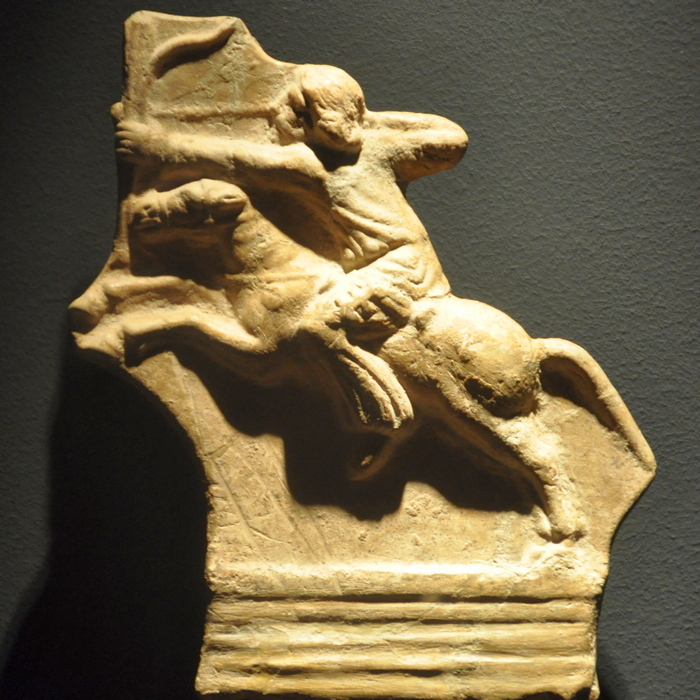
Parthian mounted archer, located in Palazzo Madama, Turin.

The sources regarding Arsaces' life differ greatly. He is mostly known from Greek and Roman sources, who were hostile to him and his dynasty due to the later Roman–Parthian Wars. In Iranian national history his descent is traced back to several mythical figures, such as being a descendant of either Kay Kawad, Kay Arash, Dara the son of Homay, or Arash, the heroic archer-figure. The affiliation of Arsaces with Arash is due to the resemblance in their names and Arsaces' coins imitating him as a bowman. According to Roman historian Ammianus Marcellinus, Arsaces was a bandit of low birth, who, after many "splendid and gallant" exploits, invaded and conquered Seleucid Persia, defeating Nicator Seleucus, and expelling the "Macedonian garrisons"

The most accepted theory is the one by the Greek geographer Strabo: according to him, Arsaces was a Scythian chieftain, who became the leader of the Parni, one of the three Scythiantribes of the Dahae confederacy of Central Asia. The Dahae relied their strength completely on horseback, and thus possessed an extremely mobile force, which was able to retreat to the south of the Aral Sea when endangered. Because of this, other empires met complications in their efforts trying to control them. Some historians such as Hashem Kazemi and Mostafa Dehpahlavan present an alternative hypothesis that Arsaces was a native Persian instead. disagreeing with accounts by Apollodorus of Artemita, Justin, and Strabo that Arsaces I belonged to the invading Parni; they instead concur with Arrian, Cassius Dio, and Zosimus on the hypothetical native Persian in Parthia origin for Arsaces I.

The Dahae had originally lived between the Jaxartes in the 4th-century BC, but gradually moved southward, possibly in the early 3rd-century BC. They first migrated southeast to Bactria, but were driven away, and as a result changed their course to the west. They gradually started settling in Parthia, a region in the south-eastern part of the Caspian Sea, that almost corresponded to present-day Khorasan Province of Iran and southern Turkmenistan. The region was then under the rule of the Seleucids. By 282/1 BC, Parthia was under considerable Parni influence. The Parni were not the only to migrate to Parthia, as the region was constantly receiving new waves of Iranian migrants from the north.

The Parni were an eastern Iranian tribe, who practised Iranian polytheism. By the middle of the 3rd-century BC, however, they had been assimilated into the local Parthian culture; they adopted Parthian, a north-western Iranian language, and became adherents of Zoroastrianism, even giving themselves Zoroastrian names, such as Arsaces' father, Phriapites, whose name was derived from Avestan *Friya pitā ("father-lover"). (Note: The Arsacids are generally believed to have been adherants of Zoroastrianism, however, this is barely apparent archaeologically. Historians such as Richard Foltz and Parvaneh Pourshariati have argued that the Arsacids were in reality Mithraists, i.e worshippers of Mithra.) Arsaces himself was probably born and raised in Parthia, speaking the Parthian language. According to the French historian Jérôme Gaslain, Arsaces could have arguably spent much of his life in the Seleucid lands, and may even have belonged to the local elite of Parthia.

The Dahae frequently served as horse archers in the armies of Greek rulers, from the Macedonian Alexander the Great (r. 336–323 BC) to the Seleucid Antiochus III the Great (r. 222–187 BC). This implies that Arsaces, who is described as an "experienced soldier" in classical records, may have served as a mercenary under the Seleucid rulers or their governors.

== Reign ==
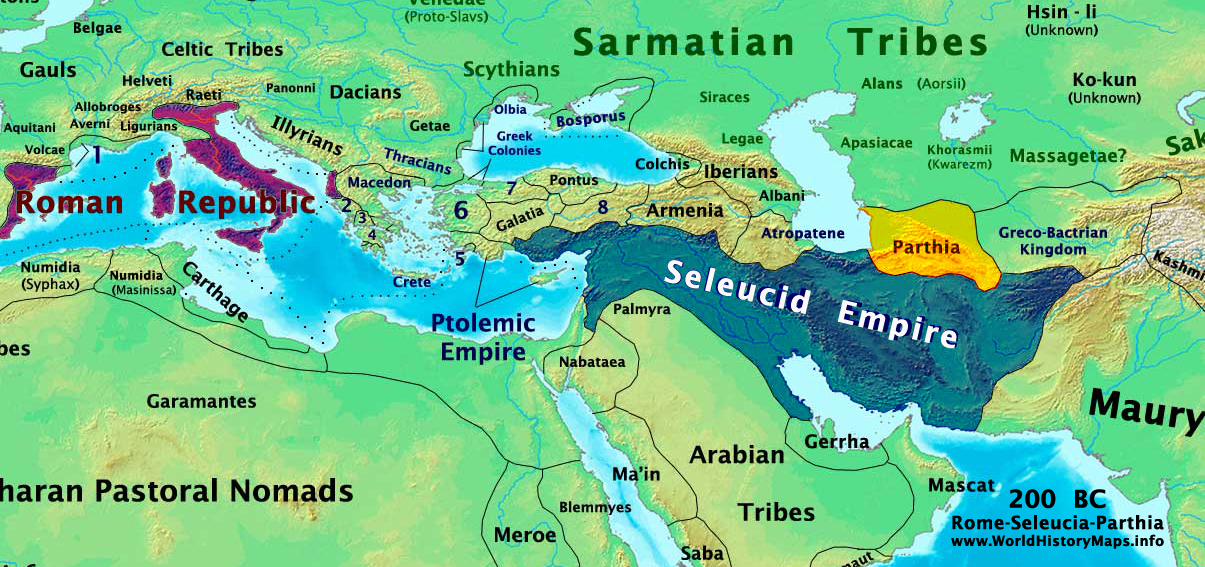
Location of Parthia and its surroundings.

=== Accession and wars ===
In c. 250 BC, Arsaces and his Parni followers seized Astauene, which lay near the Atrek valley. A few years later, probably in c. 247 BC, Arsaces was crowned king in Asaak, a city which he had founded, and which served as the Arsacid royal necropolis. His coronation at Asaak is generally presumed to mark the start of the Arsacid dynasty. Around 245 BC, Andragoras, the governor of the Seleucid province of Parthia, proclaimed his independence from the Seleucid monarch Seleucus II Callinicus (r. 246 – 225 BC), and made his governorate an independent kingdom. Following the secession of Parthia from the Seleucid Empire and the resultant loss of Seleucid military support, Andragoras had difficulty in maintaining his borders, and about 238 BC—under the command of Arsaces and his brother Tiridates I the Parni invaded Parthia and seized control of Astabene (Astawa) from Andragoras, the northern region of that territory, the administrative capital of which was Kuchan.

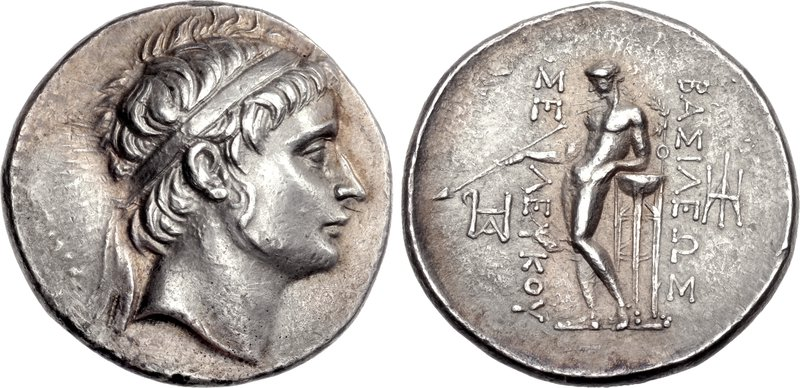
Tetradrachm of Seleucus II Callinicus, king (basileus) of the Seleucid Empire.

A short while later, the Parni seized the rest of Parthia from Andragoras, killing him in the process. With the conquest of the province, the Arsacids became known as Parthians in Greek and Roman sources. This term has likewise been in regular use by modern western authors as well, however, according to the modern historian Stefan R. Hauser, it "should be abandoned as it conveys an incorrect idea of an ethnic ruling class within the multiethnic, multilingual population". The neighbouring province of Hyrcania was shortly conquered by the Parni as well. A recovery expedition by the Seleucids under Seleucus II was made in 228 BC, which proved problematic for Arsaces, who was at the same time at war with the Greco-Bactrian ruler Diodotus II (r. 239 – 220 BC). In order to avoid fighting on two fronts, Arsaces quickly concluded a peace treaty with Diodotus II.

Nevertheless, he was unable to stop the Seleucid expedition and was forced to leave Parthia for Central Asia, where he took refuge with the Apasiacae. The Seleucid conquest proved to be short-lived; due to issues in the western portions of the Seleucid Empire, Seleucus II was forced to leave Parthia, which gave Arsaces the opportunity to regain his lost territories, and most likely also expand his dominion further south. Indeed, Arsaces' withdrawal to the Apasiacae was perhaps a strategic move, since Seleucus II neither possessed the resources to chase him nor the time to conclude a peace treaty. Arsaces also made an alliance with the Greco-Bactrians, which confirms that contact between the two powers had most likely been established long ago. According to the Roman historian Justin, Arsaces "settled the Parthian government, levied soldiers, built fortresses, and strengthened his towns." Apart from Asaak, he also founded the city of Dara in Mount Zapaortenon, a place in Parthia. Nisa, likewise founded by Arsaces, would be then used as the royal residence of the Arsacids till the 1st-century BC.

=== Succession ===
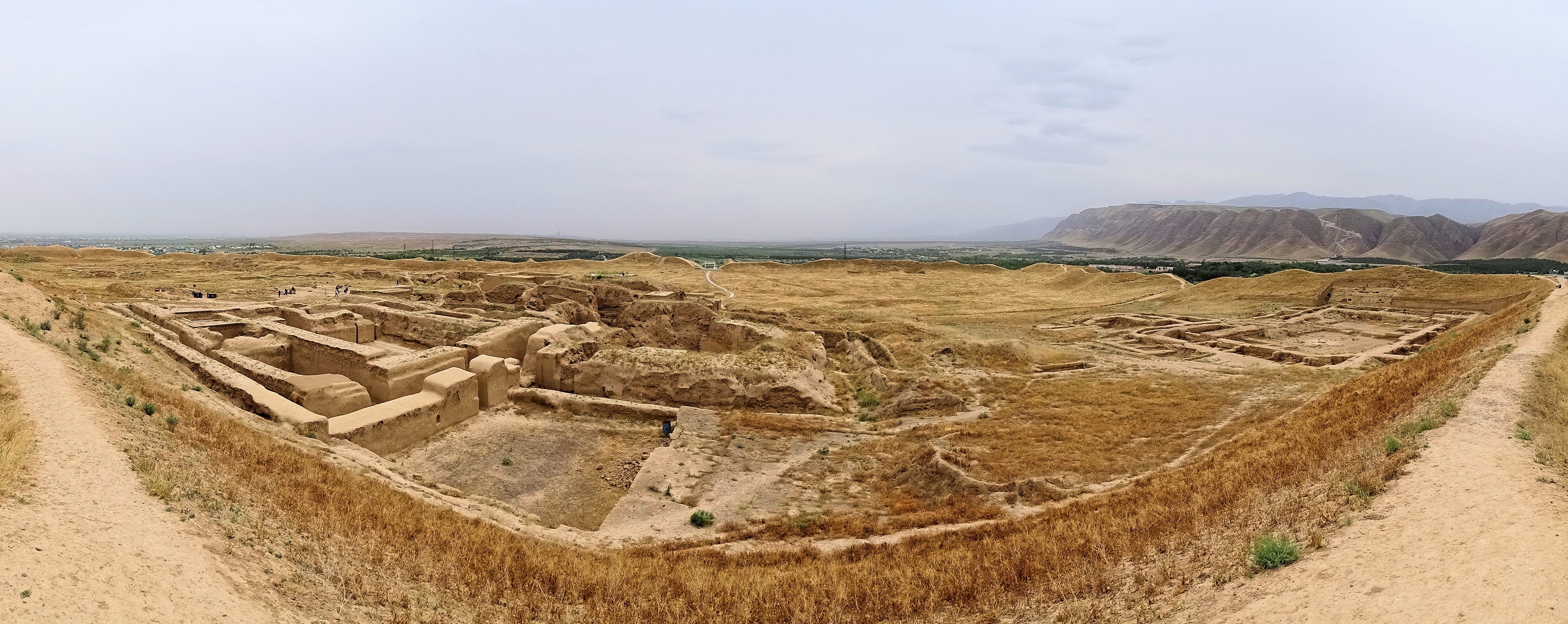
Overview of the ruins of Nisa, the former royal residence of the Arsacids.

For a long time, the line of succession of Arsaces, and to some extent his historicity, had been unclear. The now-deprecated narrative of the foundation of the Arsacid dynasty by Arsaces and his brother Tiridates, who led the Parni in revolt together, was established by Jean Foy-Vaillant in 1725. He and generations of scholars thought that after Arsaces' death, Tiridates succeeded him as king of the Arsacid dynasty. This led to some different theories, including one that considered Arsaces a legendary figure, whilst attributing the foundation of the Arsacids to Tiridates.

Between 1957 and 1962 Józef Wolski published a series of articles with the opposite view: he regarded Arsaces as the founder of the Arsacids, and Tiridates as legendary. This theory has since been supported—with minor divergences—by most scholars, until its confirmation by the discovery in Nisa of an ostracon bearing the name of Arsaces. Moreover, numismatic data and recent analysis of the sources have led to the conclusion that the character of Tiridates is indeed fictional, and that Arsaces continued to rule until his death in 217 BC, where he was succeeded by his son, Arsaces II.

== Coinage ==
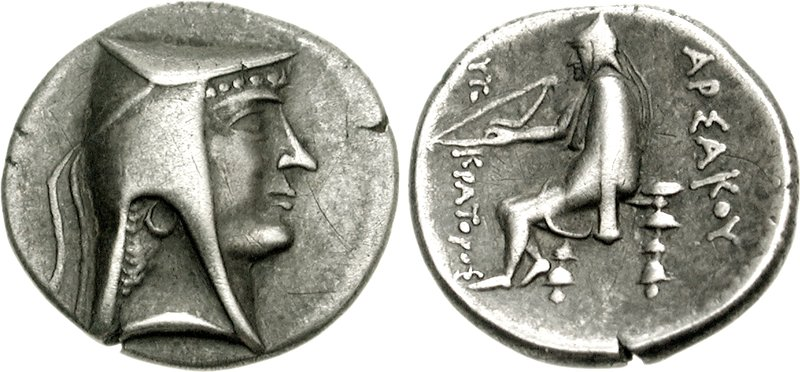
Coin of Arsaces, Nisa mint.

In essence, Arsaces' coins "provided the prototype for all subsequent Arsacid coinage, although itself undergoing a few changes". Khodadad Rezakhani adds that his coins took many stylistic elements from Seleucids and earlier Achaemenid satrapal issues, but he nonetheless made several innovations that differentiated them from those of his predecessors. According to Alireza Shapour Shahbazi, on his coins, Arsaces "deliberately diverges from Seleucid coins to emphasize his nationalistic and royal aspirations"; the typical Seleucid figure of Apollo seated on the omphalos and holding a bow is replaced by an archer imitating Arsaces, (Note: According to Fabrizio Sinisi, scholars are divided about the identity of the archer. According to Sinisi, the archer might represent a so-called "deified" ancestor of the Arsacids or simply the Arsacid king himself. Sinisi notes: "A definite answer is difficult, but as the link with the Seleucid Apollo on omphalos is still not obviously apparent in this phase, since the Parthian archer is seated on a stool, the already noted Achaemenid connections might perhaps be stressed: these would in fact provide a context for the seated archer figure, for the karen title, and for the obverse head with the soft cap as well. That the living Arsaces might have tried to represent himself as heir of the old Iranian empire of course in no way excludes that his memory could later have been subject to some kind of special homage, but the character of the Iranian royal ancestor cult still remains problematic".) who is seated on a stool (done in the same fashion as some Achaemenid satraps, such as Datames) whilst wearing Sakaian clothing and a soft cap, known as the bashlyk.

Some of the inscriptions on Arsaces' coins calls him kārny (Note: Also spelled krny or karen. According to David Sellwood, this Aramaic word may be cognate with the family name "Karen", but he adds that in "Achaemenian usage", it was the equivalent of οτρατηγόs, and thus "close to our assumed meaning for autocrat".) (the Greek equivalent being autokrator), which was a title carried by prominent Achaemenid military leaders, such as Cyrus the Younger. (Note: Rezakhani notes that the earliest coins of Arsaces bear the inscription ΑΥΤΟΚΡΑΤΟΡΟΣ. These particular coins are reportedly the only attestations to the usage of this title by the Arsacids. Rezakhani states that it might suggest "an initial submission to Seleucid suzerainty, as the title suggests that Arsaces I thought of himself as the appointed military governor of Parthia, a fact that might also show his self-understanding as the successor of Andragoras, the rebellious Seleucid satrap of Parthia". According to the same rationale, Rezakhani notes that "some issues from Nisa, in addition to including the name of Arsaces in Greek, bear Aramaic krny, an Achaemenid military title for Arsaces, replacing any Greek titles".) Through the use of this title, Arsaces was deliberately putting himself above that of a satrap, but simultaneously avoided using the royal title of basileus (king), which would imply that he followed the Seleucid regal tradition, which he dismissed. From an Iranian point of view, the title of basileus was of minor importance.

Arsaces seemingly used the city he had founded – Nisa, as a site for his coin mints. The coins of Arsaces were minted in both silver and bronze. Arsaces' silver drachms (which would become the main denomination of the Arsacids) depict his unbearded profile on the obverse, looking to the right, similar to depictions of Seleucid royals on coins. According to Fabrizio Sinisi, similarly, the seated archer on the reverse is turned to the left. The Greek legend ΑΡΣΑΚΟΥ ΑΥΤΟΚΡΑΤΟΡΟΣ is inscribed in two vertical lines on the sides of the drachms, in similar fashion to Seleucid coins. Regardless of these features, Sinisi notes that Arsaces' coins are "immediately recognizable as issued by a non-Greek ruler". For instance, Arsaces wears the pointed soft cap on the obverse, similar to coins of the Achaemenid era, as does the archer on the reverse who is dressed in an Iranian riding costume.

== Legacy ==
Arsaces' prestige endured long after his death. An everlasting fire in his honour was still guarded in the city of Asaak more than two centuries after his death, as reported by Isidore of Charax. This indicates that the act of declaring a king had a religious importance. It most likely served as the dynastic fire of the Arsacids, possibly created in order to highlight that they were heirs to the Achaemenid Empire. Due to his achievements, he became known as the "father of the nation", and his name became a royal honorific that was used by all the Arsacid monarchs out of admiration for his achievements. (Note: Rezakhani notes: "Although all Arsacid kings had their own personal names, attested in Greco-Roman sources and occasionally in the Babylonian astronomical diaries, they universally used the title Arsaces as their regnal name, supposedly in honor of Arsaces I, although even that dynastic founder might have had the personal name Tiridates (Parth. *trd’t), making Arsaces a clan name of the dynasty. In fact, in the absence of narrative sources for Arsacid history and the prominence often given to numismatic evidence for reconstructing Arsacid history, the universal use of the title Arsaces poses a particular hindrance to our understanding of the history of the dynasty.") The name also connected the Arsacids with the legendary Kayanian ruler Kavi Arshan, whose dynasty must still have been remembered by the inhabitants of eastern Iran, such as the Parthians and the Dahae. A fictitious claim was later made from the 2nd-century BC onwards by the Arsacids, which represented Arsaces as a descendant of the Achaemenid King of Kings, Artaxerxes II.

The family of Arsaces would rule for four and a half centuries, till it was toppled by the Sasanian Empire in 224 AD. Even then, however, the descendants of Arsaces continued to wield considerable influence and authority; one of the Seven Great Houses of Iran, the House of Karen, produced several major figures in Iranian history, such as the 6th-century vizier Bozorgmehr, and the 9th-century prince and rebel Mazyar (r. 817–839). The Arsacids also played an important role in the history of the Caucasus; the principalities of Armenia, Caucasian Albania and Iberia were ruled by branches of the Arsacid dynasty. According to Procopius, even as late as the 6th-century, the Armenian nobility still remembered their Arsacid heritage and the character of Arsaces.

== Family tree ==
Legend
Orange	King of Kings	Yellow	King

Phriapites
Arsaces I (r. 247 – 217 BC)	Unknown
Arsaces II (r. 217 – 191 BC)	Unknown
Priapatius (r. 191 – 176 BC)
Phraates I (r. 176 – 171 BC)	Mithridates I (r. 171 – 132 BC)	Artabanus I (r. 127 – 124/3 BC)

== See also ==
- Valarsace

== Bibliography ==
=== Ancient works ===
- Isidore of Charax. Parthian Stations.
- Justin, Epitome of the Philippic History of Pompeius Trogus.
- Ammianus Marcellinus, Res Gestae.
- Strabo, Geographica.

=== Modern works ===
- Axworthy, Michael (2008). A History of Iran: Empire of the Mind. New York: Basic Books. pp. 1–368. ISBN 978-0-465-00888-9.
- Boyce, Mary (1984). Zoroastrians: Their Religious Beliefs and Practices. Psychology Press. pp. 1–252. ISBN 9780415239028.
- Frye, Richard Nelson (1984). The History of Ancient Iran. C.H.Beck. pp. 1–411. ISBN 9783406093975. "false."
- Bickerman, Elias J. (1983). "The Seleucid Period". In Yarshater, Ehsan (ed.). The Cambridge History of Iran: The Seleucid, Parthian and Sasanian Periods. Vol. 3(1). Cambridge: Cambridge University Press. pp. 3–20. ISBN 0-521-20092-X.
- Bivar, A.D.H. (1983). "The Political History of Iran under the Arsacids". In Yarshater, Ehsan (ed.). The Cambridge History of Iran: The Seleucid, Parthian and Sasanian Periods. Vol. 3(1). Cambridge: Cambridge University Press. pp. 21–99. ISBN 0-521-20092-X.
- Boyce, M. (1986). "Arsacids iv. Arsacid religion". In Yarshater, Ehsan (ed.). Encyclopædia Iranica. Vol. II/5: Armenia and Iran IV–Art in Iran I. London and New York: Routledge & Kegan Paul. pp. 540–541. ISBN 978-0-71009-105-5.
- Curtis, Vesta Sarkhosh (2007). "The Iranian Revival in the Parthian Period". In Curtis, Vesta Sarkhosh; Stewart, Sarah (eds.). The Age of the Parthians: The Ideas of Iran. Vol. 2. London & New York: I.B. Tauris & Co Ltd., in association with the London Middle East Institute at SOAS and the British Museum. pp. 7–25. ISBN 978-1-84511-406-0.
- Dąbrowa, Edward (2012). "The Arsacid Empire". In Daryaee, Touraj (ed.). The Oxford Handbook of Iranian History. Oxford University Press. pp. 1–432. ISBN 978-0-19-987575-7. Archived from the original on 2019-01-01.
- Foltz, Richard (2013). Religions of Iran: From Prehistory to the Present. Oneworld Publications. pp. 1–368. ISBN 9781780743097.
- Gaslain, Jérôme (2016). "Some Aspects of Political History: Early Arsacid Kings and the Seleucids". In Curtis, Vesta Sarkhosh; Pendleton, Elizabeth J.; Alram, Michael; Daryaee, Touraj (eds.). The Parthian and Early Sasanian Empires: Adaptation and Expansion. Oxbow Books. ISBN 9781785702082.
- Ghodrat-Dizaji, Mehrdad (2016). "Remarks on the Location of the Province of Parthia in the Sasanian Period". In Curtis, Vesta Sarkhosh; Pendleton, Elizabeth J.; Alram, Michael; Daryaee, Touraj (eds.). The Parthian and Early Sasanian Empires: Adaptation and Expansion. Oxbow Books. ISBN 9781785702082.
- Hauser, Stefan R. (2013). "The Arsacids (Parthians)". In Potts, Daniel T. (ed.). The Oxford Handbook of Ancient Iran. Oxford University Press. pp. 728–751. ISBN 9780190668662.
- Kazemi, Hashem; Dehpahlavan, Mostafa (2023). "Parthian Arsacids or Scythian Arsacids? The emergence of the Arsacid based on written sources and archaeological evidence (Sources, Obstacles and Challenges)". Journal of Iranian Studies (in Persian). 13 (4): 1–22. doi:10.22059/jis.2023.350547.1167. ISSN 2676-4601..
- Kia, Mehrdad (2016). The Persian Empire: A Historical Encyclopedia [2 volumes]. ABC-CLIO. ISBN 978-1610693912.
- Hoover, Oliver D. (2009). Handbook of Syrian Coins: Royal and Civic Issues, Fourth to First Centuries BC [The Handbook of Greek Coinage Series, Volume 9]. Lancaster/London: Classical Numismatic Group.
- Lecoq, P. (1985). "Aparna". In Yarshater, Ehsan (ed.). Encyclopædia Iranica. Vol. II/2: Anthropology–ʿArab Moḥammad. London and New York: Routledge & Kegan Paul. p. 151. ISBN 978-0-71009-102-4.
- Olbrycht, Marek Jan (2021). Early Arsakid Parthia (ca. 250-165 B.C.). Brill. ISBN 978-9004460751.
- Overtoom, Nikolaus Leo (2020). Reign of Arrows: The Rise of the Parthian Empire in the Hellenistic Middle East. Oxford University Press. ISBN 9780190888329.
- Pourshariati, Parvaneh (2017). "Kārin". In Yarshater, Ehsan (ed.). Encyclopædia Iranica (Online ed.). Encyclopædia Iranica Foundation.
- Pourshariati, Parvaneh (2008). Decline and Fall of the Sasanian Empire: The Sasanian-Parthian Confederacy and the Arab Conquest of Iran. London and New York: I.B. Tauris. ISBN 978-1-84511-645-3.
- Rezakhani, Khodadad (2013). "Arsacid, Elymaean, and Persid Coinage". In Potts, Daniel T. (ed.). The Oxford Handbook of Ancient Iran. Oxford University Press. ISBN 978-0199733309.
- Schippmann, K. (1986). "Arsacids ii. The Arsacid dynasty". In Yarshater, Ehsan (ed.). Encyclopædia Iranica. Vol. II/5: Armenia and Iran IV–Art in Iran I. London and New York: Routledge & Kegan Paul. pp. 525–536. ISBN 978-0-71009-105-5.
- Schmitt, R. (1986). "Apasiacae". In Yarshater, Ehsan (ed.). Encyclopædia Iranica. Vol. II/2: Anthropology–ʿArab Moḥammad. London and New York: Routledge & Kegan Paul. pp. 151–152. ISBN 978-0-71009-102-4.
- Sellwood, David (1983). "Parthian Coins". In Yarshater, Ehsan (ed.). The Cambridge History of Iran: The Seleucid, Parthian and Sasanian Periods. Vol. 3(1). Cambridge: Cambridge University Press. ISBN 0-521-20092-X.
- Shahbazi, A. Sh. (1986). "Arsacids i. Origins". In Yarshater, Ehsan (ed.). Encyclopædia Iranica. Vol. II/5: Armenia and Iran IV–Art in Iran I. London and New York: Routledge & Kegan Paul. p. 525. ISBN 978-0-71009-105-5.
- Sinisi, Fabrizio (2012). "The Coinage of the Parthians". In Metcalf, William E. (ed.). The Oxford Handbook of Greek and Roman Coinage. Oxford University Press. ISBN 978-0195305746.
- Foy-Vaillant, Jean (1725). Arsacidarum imperium, sive, Regum Parthorum historia : ad fidem numismatum accommodata. Vol. 1. Paris.
- Weiskopf, Michael (1993). "Dārā (city)". In Yarshater, Ehsan (ed.). Encyclopædia Iranica. Vol. VI/6: Daf(f) and Dāyera–Dārā. London and New York: Routledge & Kegan Paul. pp. 671–672. ISBN 978-1-56859-004-2.
- Wolski, Józef (April 1959). "L'Historicité d'Arsace Ier". Historia: Zeitschrift für Alte Geschichte (in French). 8 (2): 222–238. JSTOR 4434614.
- Wolski, Józef (April 1962). "Arsace II et la Généalogie des Premiers Arsacides". Historia: Zeitschrift für Alte Geschichte (in French). 11 (2): 138–145. JSTOR 4434737.

Arsaces I of Parthia Arsacid dynasty Died: 217 BC
New title	King of Parthia; 247–217 BC	Succeeded by Arsaces II
