= Rinnu =

Queen consort of the Parthian Empire

Rinnu (2nd century BC) was a queen consort of the Parthian Empire by marriage to Mithridates I of Parthia (r. 171–132 BC). She was the mother of King Phraates II (r. 132–127 BC) and ruled the Parthian Empire as regent during the minority of her son. She was one of only two women to rule Parthia, the other being queen Musa of Parthia.

She was the daughter of a Median magnate. Her son Phraates succeeded his father in 132 BC; due to her son still being a minor, she ruled with him at the beginning of his reign. She is the first woman known to have ruled Parthia. Her reign did not last long, as her son was fourteen and it was soon possible to have him declared an adult.
