= Tiridates I of Parthia =

Tiridates or Teridates or Tirdad or تیرداد /tɪˈrɪdətiːz/ Parthian:𐭕𐭉𐭓𐭉𐭃𐭕 (Tīridāt) is a Persian name, given by Arrian in his Parthica to the brother of Arsaces I, the founder of the Parthian kingdom, whom he is said to have succeeded around 246 BC. But Arrian's account seems to be quite unhistorical and modern historians believe that the character of Tiridates is fictional, and that Arsaces continued to rule Parthia until 217 BC.

In Arrian's account, Tiridates maintained himself for a short time in Parthia, during the dissolution of the Seleucid Empire by the attacks of Ptolemy III in 246 BC and the following years. Tiridates was defeated and expelled by Seleucus II around 238 BC. But when Seleucus was forced, by the rebellion of his brother, Antiochus Hierax, to return to the west, Tiridates came back and defeated the Macedonians. Tiridates adopted the name of his brother Arsaces, and after him, all the other Parthian kings did the same.

== See also ==
- Tiridates II of Parthia is called "Tiridates I" in accounts that omit the earlier Tiridates.

== Sources ==
- Arrian, Parthica (preserved by Photius and Syncellus); Syrica, 65 (preserved by Isidorus of Charax).
- Dąbrowa, Edward (2012). "The Arsacid Empire". In Daryaee, Touraj (ed.). The Oxford Handbook of Iranian History. Oxford University Press. pp. 1–432. ISBN 978-0-19-987575-7. Archived from the original on 2019-01-01.
- Strabo xi.
- Junianus Justinus, Historiarum Philippicarum, xli, 4.
