= Himeros (Parthian) =

Himeros (called Euhemeros by Diodorus) was an Iranian officer of Hyrcanian origin, who controlled Babylonia on behalf of the Arsacid king Phraates II (r. 138–128) from 129 BC.

Although Himeros never took the title of king, he was of great significance. He is mentioned by various ancient historians, such as Diodorus and Justin on account of his exceptional atrocities.

Phraates II was confronted with war on two fronts during his reign. In the west, the Seleucids attacked and in the east the nomadic peoples, who had already destroyed the Greco-Bactrian kingdom, threatened. Phraates II moved east against these nomads and appointed Himeros who was one of his favourites on account of his good appearance as satrap in Mesopotamia.

Himeros' tenure stood out principally for his tyrannical atrocities and constant harassment of his subjects in Babylon and the surrounding cities. He would have even his own underlings sold into slavery. He set fire to the agora and the temple of Babylon and destroyed wide sections of the city. Perhaps because of this, his rule, which also encompassed Seleucia on the Tigris and Ctesiphon, seems to have been very brief indeed. Shortly before 127 BC, Hyspaosines is attested in Babylon as ruler. The later fate of Himeros is unknown.

== Bibliography ==
=== Ancient works ===
- Justin 42.1 ^{[usurped]}
- Diodorus Siculus 34.21.
- Poseidonius, Histories 16 (Fragment, cited in Athenaios, Deipnosophistai 11.466)

=== Modern works ===
- Frye, Richard Nelson (1984). The History of Ancient Iran. C.H.Beck. pp. 1–411. ISBN 9783406093975. "false."
- Shayegan, M. Rahim (2011). Arsacids and Sasanians: Political Ideology in Post-Hellenistic and Late Antique Persia. Cambridge University Press. pp. 1–539. ISBN 9780521766418.
- Kia, Mehrdad (2016). The Persian Empire: A Historical Encyclopedia [2 volumes]: A Historical Encyclopedia. ABC-CLIO. ISBN 978-1610693912.
