= Daniel T. Potts =

American historian and archeologist (b. 1953)

- Born: 1953 (age 72–73)
- Citizenship: U.S.
- Education: Harvard University
- Scientific career
- Workplaces: Institute for the Study of the Ancient World of New York University

Daniel T. Potts, FBA (born 1953), is an American historian and archeologist who is the Professor of Ancient Near Eastern Archeology and History at the Institute for the Study of the Ancient World of New York University.

== Career ==
Potts graduated from Harvard University (B.A. in 1975 and Ph.D. in 1980) and worked at the Free University of Berlin (1981–86) and the University of Copenhagen (1980–81, 1986–1991). From 1991 to 2012 he was the Edwin Cuthbert Hall Professor of Middle Eastern Archaeology at the University of Sydney. Currently he is the Professor of Ancient Near Eastern Archeology and History at the Institute for the Study of the Ancient World of New York University. He also previously worked in Iran, Turkey and the United Arab Emirates.

Potts is an expert in the history of the ancient Near East. He primarily focused his research in the history of Iran from ancient times to the pre-modern era and the history of the Arabian Peninsula.

Potts also is a co-editor of The Oxford History of the Ancient Near East, one of the most authoritative series of the collective works about the subject.

== Selected bibliography ==
=== Author ===
- Potts, Daniel T. (2022). Persia Portrayed: Envoys to the West, 1600-1842. Mage Publishers. ISBN 978-1-949-44539-8.
- Potts, Daniel T., ed. (2022). Agreeable News from Persia: Iran in the Colonial and Early Republican American Press, 1712-1848. 3 volume set. Universal- und kulturhistorische Studien / Studies in Universal and Cultural History. Wiesbaden: Springer VS. doi:10.1007/978-3-658-36032-0. ISBN 978-3-658-36032-0. ISSN 2524-3799 – via Google Books.
- Potts, Daniel T. (2014). Nomadism in Iran: From Antiquity to the Modern Era. New York: Oxford University Press. doi:10.1093/acprof:oso/9780199330799.001.0001. ISBN 978-0-199-33079-9 – via Google Books.
- Potts, Daniel T. (2010). Mesopotamia, Iran and Arabia from the Seleucids to the Sasanians. Variorum Collected Studies Series. Vol. 962. Farnham: Ashgate Publishing. ISBN 978-1-409-40535-1.
- Potts, Daniel T. (2000). Ancient Magan: The Secrets of Tell Abraq (PDF). In Depth Adventure Guides. Winnipeg, MB: Trident Press, Ltd. ISBN 978-1-900-72431-9 – via Ancient Coastal Settlements, Ports and Harbours.
- Potts, Daniel T. (1999). The Archaeology of Elam: Formation and Transformation of an Ancient Iranian State (PDF). Cambridge World Archaeology. Cambridge: Cambridge University Press. doi:10.1017/CBO9780511489617. ISBN 978-0-511-32330-0 – via Università degli Studi di Firenze.
- Potts, Daniel T. (1997). Mesopotamian Civilization: The Material Foundations. Athlone Publications in Egyptology and Ancient Near Eastern Studies. Ithaka, N. Y.: Cornell University Press. ISBN 978-0-801-43339-9 – via Google Books.
- Potts, Daniel T. (1991). The Pre-Islamic Coinage of Eastern Arabia. Carsten Niebuhr Institut København: CNI Publications. Vol. 14. Coppenhagen: Museum Tusculanum Press. ISBN 978-8-772-89156-9 – via Google Books.
- Potts, Daniel T. (1992). The Arabian Gulf in Antiquity: From Prehistory to the Fall of the Achaemenid Empire. Etudes bibliques. Vol. I. Oxford: Clarendon Press. ISBN 978-0-198-14390-1.
- Potts, Daniel T. (1990). The Arabian Gulf in Antiquity: From Alexander the Great to the Coming of Islam. ACLS Humanities E-Book. Vol. II. Oxford: Clarendon Press. ISBN 978-0-198-14391-8.
- Potts, Daniel T. (1989). Miscellanea Hasaitica. Carsten Niebuhr Institut København: CNI publications. Vol. 9. Coppenhagen: Museum Tusculanum Press. ISBN 978-8-772-89068-5 – via Google Books.

=== Edited books ===
- Potts, Daniel T., ed. (2013). The Oxford Handbook of Ancient Iran. Oxford and New York City: Oxford University Press. doi:10.1093/oxfordhb/9780199733309.001.0001. ISBN 978-0-19-973330-9 – via the Internet Archive.
- Potts, Daniel T., ed. (2012). A Companion to the Archaeology of the Ancient Near East. Blackwell Companions to the Ancient World. Vol. 94. Chichester: Wiley-Blackwell. doi:10.1002/9781444360790. ISBN 978-1-405-18988-0 – via the Internet Archive.

The Oxford History of the Ancient Near East

- Radner, Karen; Moeller, Nadine; Potts, Daniel T., eds. (2020). The Oxford History of the Ancient Near East: From the Beginnings to Old Kingdom Egypt and the Dynasty of Akkad. Vol. 1. New York: Oxford University Press. ISBN 978-0-190-68785-4.
- Radner, Karen; Moeller, Nadine; Potts, Daniel T., eds. (2022). The Oxford History of the Ancient Near East: From the End of the Third Millennium BC to the Fall of Babylon. Vol. 2. New York: Oxford University Press. ISBN 978-0-190-68760-1.
- Radner, Karen; Moeller, Nadine; Potts, Daniel T., eds. (2022). The Oxford History of the Ancient Near East: From the Hyksos to the Late Second Millennium BC. Vol. 3. New York: Oxford University Press. ISBN 978-0-190-68757-1.
- Radner, Karen; Moeller, Nadine; Potts, Daniel T., eds. (2023). The Oxford History of the Ancient Near East: The Age of Assyria. Vol. 4. New York: Oxford University Press. ISBN 978-0-190-68763-2.
- Radner, Karen; Moeller, Nadine; Potts, Daniel T., eds. (2023). The Oxford History of the Ancient Near East: The Age of Persia. Vol. 5. New York: Oxford University Press. ISBN 978-0-190-68766-3.
