= William E. Metcalf =

American historian (1947–2025)

William E. Metcalf, FSA (born December 16, 1947 – August 2, 2025) was an American numismatist, ancient historian, and former curator, who was an expert in the study of Roman coins. He is especially known for his pioneering work on Roman provincial coins and particularly the Roman cistophori of Asia Minor.

== Education ==
Each of his degrees was conferred by the University of Michigan: his A.B. in Latin, with distinction and highest honors, in 1969, his A.M. in classical studies in 1970, and his Ph.D. in classical studies in 1973. There, he was a student of the prominent numismatist Theodore V. Buttrey Jr.

== Career ==
As soon as he received his Ph.D., he became assistant curator of Roman and Byzantine coins at the American Numismatic Society in New York until 1975, when he was promoted to associate curator, while in 1978 he became deputy chief curator; in 1979 he was promoted to chief curator, following the tenure of Margaret Thompson, a position he held until 2000. After his departure, he remained an honorary curator and life fellow of the American Numismatic Society.

He was a visiting professor at several institutions, including Columbia University, Princeton University, University of Padua, Bryn Mawr College, Rutgers University, and New York University. He became curator of coins and medals at the Yale University Art Gallery and professor of classics (adjunct) at Yale University in 2002; in 2007, his position was endowed as the Ben Lee Damsky Curator of Coins and Medals, a post he held until his retirement in 2014.

== Honors and distinctions ==
Metcalf held a number of honors and awards for his research and contributions to numismatics. Notable recognitions include his membership at the Institute for Advanced Study in 1988–1989, election to fellowship in the Society of Antiquaries of London in 1998, the Jeton de Vermeil of the Société française de Numismatique in 2008, and as the honorand of an annual lecture series in numismatics by the Archaeological Institute of America. In 2018, the American Numismatic Society published a Festschrift in his honor; it was edited by Nathan T. Elkins and Jane DeRose Evans and is entitled Concordia Disciplinarum: Essays on Ancient Coinage, History and Archaeology in Honor of William E. Metcalf. He received the 2024 Archer M. Huntington Award and Medal from the American Numismatic Society, and delivered the Silvia Mani Hurter Lecture on "The Making of Roman Provincial Coinage (X).

== Selected books ==
The Cistophori of Hadrian (New York: American Numismatic Society, 1980).

The Silver Coinage of Caesarea in Cappadocia, Vespasian to Commodus (New York: American Numismatic Society, 1996).

The Later Republican Cistophori (New York: American Numismatic Society, 2017).

(as editor), The Oxford Handbook of Greek and Roman Coinage (Oxford and New York: Oxford University Press, 2012).
