= Arsaces =

Arsaces or Arsakes (Ἀρσάκης, Arsákēs, Graecized form of Old Persian 𐎠𐎼𐏁𐎣 R̥šakaʰ) is the eponymous Greek form of the dynastic name of the Parthian Empire of Iran adopted by all epigraphically attested rulers of the Arsacid dynasties. The indigenous Parthian and Armenian form was 𐭀𐭓𐭔𐭊 Aršak and Արշակ Aršak.

Kings of this name include:

- Arsaces I of Parthia, c. 247–211 BC
- Arsaces II of Parthia, c. 211–191 BC, in older sequences known as 'Artabanus I'
- Arsaces of Pontus, Roman Client King of Pontus in the second half of the 1st century BC, son of Pharnaces II of Pontus
- Arsaces I of Armenia, son of Artabanus III of Parthia, King of Armenia in 35
- Arsaces II (Arshak II), King of Armenia c.350–368
- Arsaces III (Arshak III), King of Armenia 378–387
- Arsakes, a minor Indo-Scythian ruler

== Others ==
- Arsaces, son of King Khosrov IV of Armenia
- Arsaces (conspirator) - A Byzantine Armenian, instigator of Artabanes plot against Justinian I

== See also ==
- Arash (given name)
- Ashk (given name), Arshak, Arshaka
