= Bagasis =

Parthian prince

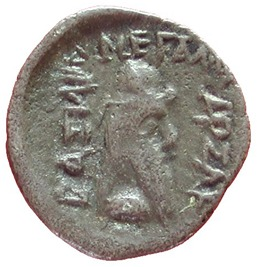
The reverse of a coin minted by Mithridates I with the image of Bagasis

Bagasis (also spelled Bakasis, Bagayasha and Vakasis) was a Parthian prince, who played an important role in Parthian politics from 148/7 BC, where he was appointed the governor of the newly conquered region of Media by his brother and king Mithridates I (r. 171–132 BC). Bagasis was initially suggested by the modern historian Gholamreza F. Assar (2005) to have ruled as king briefly in 126 BC, but he later retracted this suggestion (2009). Bagasis was survived by an unnamed son, who occupied high offices under Mithridates II (r. 124–91 BC).

== Sources ==
- Assar, Gholamreza F. (2005). "Genealogy and Coinage of the early Parthian rulers". Parthica. 7.
- Assar, Gholamreza F. (2009). "Artabanus of Trogus Pompeius' 41st Prologue". Electrum. 15. Kraków.
- Lerner, Jeffrey D. (2017). "Mithradates I and the parthian archer". In Schlude, Jason; Rubin, Benjamin (eds.). Arsacids, Romans and Local Elites : Cross-cultural Interactions of the Parthian Empire (1st ed.). Oxford and Philadelphia: Oxbow Books. pp. 1–24. ISBN 978-1-785-70595-3. JSTOR j.ctt1mmftfp.
- Olbrycht, Marek Jan (2010). "The early reign of Mithradates II the Great in Parthia". Anabasis. 1: 144–158.
- Olbrycht, Marek Jan (2021). Early Arsakid Parthia (ca. 250-165 B.C.). Brill. ISBN 978-9004460751.
- Overtoom, Nikolaus Leo (2020). Reign of Arrows: The Rise of the Parthian Empire in the Hellenistic Middle East. Oxford: Oxford University Press. ISBN 978-0190888329.
- Sharīʻatʹzādah, Ali Asgar (2011). سكه هاى ايران زمىن : مجموعه سكه‌ هاى مؤسسه کتابخانه و موزه ملى ملک، از دوره هخامنشى تا پاىان دوره پهلوى [Coins of Iran Zemin: collection of coins of Malek National Museum and Library Institute, from the Achaemenid period to the end of the Pahlavi period] (in Persian). Teheran: Pazineh Press. pp. 1–338. ISBN 978-6-001-80009-2.
- Shayegan, M. Rahim (2011). Arsacids and Sasanians: Political Ideology in Post-Hellenistic and Late Antique Persia. Cambridge University Press. pp. 1–539. ISBN 9780521766418.
