= Arsaces II of Parthia =

Arsaces II 𐭀𐭓𐭔𐭊
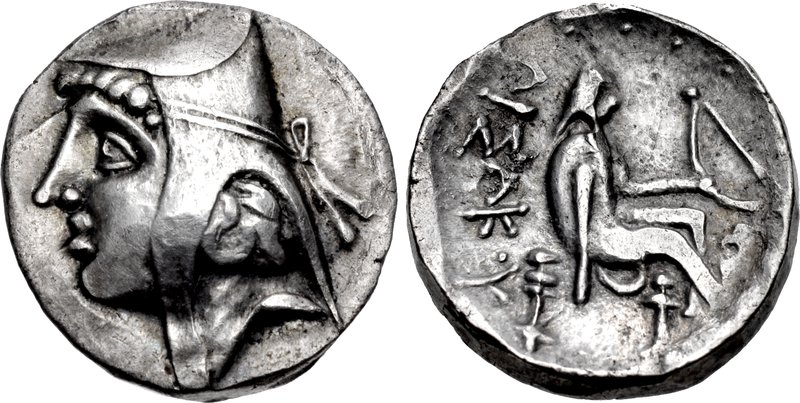
- Coin of Arsaces II.

King of the Arsacid dynasty
- Reign: 217 – 191 BC
- Predecessor: Arsaces I
- Successor: Priapatius
- Died: 191 BC
- Father: Arsaces I
- Religion: Zoroastrianism

Arsaces II (/ˈɑːrsəsiːz/. From Ancient Greek: Ἀρσάκης; in Parthian: 𐭀𐭓𐭔𐭊 Aršak, Persian: اشک Ašk), was the Arsacid king of Parthia from 217 BC to 191 BC.

== Name ==
Arsacēs is the Latin form of the Greek Arsákēs (Ἀρσάκης), itself from Parthian Aršak (𐭀𐭓𐭔𐭊). The Old Persian equivalent is Aršaka- (𐎠𐎼𐏁𐎣).

== Biography ==
Arsaces II succeeded his father Arsaces I in 217 BC. In 209 BC, the energetic Seleucid king Antiochus III the Great recaptured Parthia, which had been previously seized from the Seleucids by Arsaces I and the Parni around 247 BC. Arsaces II sued for peace following his defeat in the Battle of Mount Labus. Prior to this, Antiochus had already occupied the Parthian capital at Hecatompylos, pushing forward to Tagae near Damghan. Following the defeat of Arsaces II at Mount Labus, Antiochus turned westward into Hyrcania where he occupied Tambrax. The heavily barricaded city of Syrinx was then taken by siege.

In the terms of the peace, Arsaces accepted feudatory status and from then onwards ruled Parthia and Hyrcani as a vassal state of the Seleucids. Antiochus in turn withdrew his troops westwards, where he would subsequently be embroiled in wars with Rome and so would leave the fledgling Parthian kingdom to its own devices. Arsaces II was succeeded by his relative Priapatius in 191 BC.

== Sources ==
- Bivar, A. D. H. (2002). "Gorgān v. Pre-Islamic history". Encyclopaedia Iranica, Vol. XI, Fasc. 2. pp. 151–153.
- Shahbazi, A. Sh. (1986). "Arsacids i. Origins". Encyclopaedia Iranica, Vol. II, Fasc. 5. Cyril Toumanoff. p. 525.
- Schippmann, K. (1986). "Arsacids ii. The Arsacid dynasty". Encyclopaedia Iranica, Vol. II, Fasc. 5. Cyril Toumanoff. pp. 525–536.
- Kia, Mehrdad (2016). The Persian Empire: A Historical Encyclopedia [2 volumes]: A Historical Encyclopedia. ABC-CLIO. ISBN 978-1610693912.
- Bickerman, Elias J. (1983). "The Seleucid Period". In Yarshater, Ehsan (ed.). The Cambridge History of Iran: The Seleucid, Parthian and Sasanian Periods. Vol. 3(1). Cambridge: Cambridge University Press. pp. 3–20. ISBN 0-521-20092-X.
- Bivar, A.D.H. (1983). "The Political History of Iran under the Arsacids". In Yarshater, Ehsan (ed.). The Cambridge History of Iran: The Seleucid, Parthian and Sasanian Periods. Vol. 3(1). Cambridge: Cambridge University Press. pp. 21–99. ISBN 0-521-20092-X.
- Curtis, Vesta Sarkhosh; Stewart, Sarah, eds. (2007), The Age of the Parthians, Ideas of Iran, vol. 2, London: I. B. Tauris
- Dąbrowa, Edward (2012). "The Arsacid Empire". In Daryaee, Touraj (ed.). The Oxford Handbook of Iranian History. Oxford University Press. pp. 1–432. ISBN 978-0-19-987575-7. Archived from the original on 2019-01-01.

Arsaces II of Parthia Arsacid dynasty Died: 191 BC
Preceded by Arsaces I	King of Parthia; 217–191 BC	Succeeded by Priapatius
