= 193 BC =

193 BC in various calendars
- Gregorian calendar: 193 BC; CXCIII BC
- Ab urbe condita: 561
- Ancient Egypt era: XXXIII dynasty, 131
- Pharaoh: Ptolemy V Epiphanes, 11
- Ancient Greek Olympiad (summer): 146th Olympiad, year 4
- Assyrian calendar: 4558
- Balinese saka calendar: N/A
- Bengali calendar: −786 – −785
- Berber calendar: 758
- Buddhist calendar: 352
- Burmese calendar: −830
- Byzantine calendar: 5316–5317
- Chinese calendar: 丁未年 (Fire Goat); 2505 or 2298 — to — 戊申年 (Earth Monkey); 2506 or 2299
- Coptic calendar: −476 – −475
- Discordian calendar: 974
- Ethiopian calendar: −200 – −199
- Hebrew calendar: 3568–3569
- Hindu calendars
- Vikram Samvat: −136 – −135
- Shaka Samvat: N/A
- Kali Yuga: 2908–2909
- Holocene calendar: 9808
- Iranian calendar: 814 BP – 813 BP
- Islamic calendar: 839 BH – 838 BH
- Javanese calendar: N/A
- Julian calendar: N/A
- Korean calendar: 2141
- Minguo calendar: 2104 before ROC 民前2104年
- Nanakshahi calendar: −1660
- Seleucid era: 119/120 AG
- Thai solar calendar: 350–351
- Tibetan calendar: མེ་མོ་ལུག་ལོ་ (female Fire-Sheep) −66 or −447 or −1219 — to — ས་ཕོ་སྤྲེ་ལོ་ (male Earth-Monkey) −65 or −446 or −1218

Year 193 BC was a year of the pre-Julian Roman calendar. At the time it was known as the Year of the Consulship of Merula and Thermus (or, less frequently, year 561 Ab urbe condita). The denomination 193 BC for this year has been used since the early medieval period, when the Anno Domini calendar era became the prevalent method in Europe for naming a year.

== Events ==
=== By place ===
==== Greece ====
- Eumenes II of Pergamum appeals to Rome for help against the Seleucid king Antiochus III who is threatening to conquer Greece. The Roman proconsul Titus Quinctius Flamininus supports the Roman championship of Greek autonomy in Anatolia.
- Flamininus is sent to negotiate with Antiochus III and warns him not to interfere with the Greek states. Antiochus does not accept that Flamininus has the authority to speak for the Greeks and promises to leave Greece alone only if the Romans do the same.
- Flamininus attempts to rally the Greeks against Antiochus III and to counter the pro-Seleucid policy of the Aetolians. When the Aetolians call on Antiochus III for aid, Flamininus persuades the Achaean League to declare war on both parties. He also prevents Philopoemen from taking Sparta.
- In the meantime, the Spartan ruler, Nabis, moves to recover lost territory, including Gythium.
- Carneades of Cyrene moves to Athens to found the third or new Academy.

==== Rome ====
- The first porticos were built in Rome.

==== Egypt ====
- Cleopatra I Syra, daughter of Antiochus III and Laodice, marries the Egyptian King Ptolemy V Epiphanes.

== Deaths ==
- Xiao He, prime minister of the early Han dynasty in China who has been a key figure in Liu Bang's rise to power after the fall of the Qin dynasty
