= Mehrdad Kia =

Historian and author

Mehrdad Kia (Persian: مهرداد کیا) is a Professor of History and Director of the Central and Southwest Asian Studies Center at the University of Montana. He focusses on the history of the Middle East and Central Asia. Kia also holds interests in the intellectual history of 19th-century and early 20th-century Iran (Persia), the Ottoman Empire and the South Caucasus. He has published extensively on the emergence of a new intellectual class in Iran, which focused primarily on issues of political modernization, social and economic reform, and the conflict between Islam and modernity. He has won numerous awards for his teaching. In 2000, the Carnegie Foundation for Teaching directed by the Council for Advancement and Support of Education honored Kia as one of the U.S. Professors of the Year.

Kia was born and raised in Iran.
