= Parthian language =

Extinct Iranian language

Parthian
- Arsacid Pahlavi
- Pahlawānīg
- Native to: Parthian Empire (incl. Arsacid dynasty of Armenia, Arsacid dynasty of Iberia and Arsacid dynasty of Caucasian Albania)
- Region: Parthia, ancient Iran
- Era: State language 248 BC – 224 AD. Marginalized by Middle Persian from the 3rd century, though extant for longer in the Caucasus due to several eponymous branches.
- Language family: Indo-European: Indo-Iranian; Iranian; Western Iranian; Northwestern Iranian; Parthian
- Writing system: Inscriptional Parthian, Manichaean script

Language codes
- ISO 639-3: xpr
- Glottolog: part1239

The Parthian language, also known as Arsacid Pahlavi and Pahlawānīg, is an extinct ancient Northwestern Iranian language once spoken in Parthia, a region situated in present-day northeastern Iran and Turkmenistan. Parthian was the language of state of the Arsacid Parthian Empire (248 BC – 224 AD), as well as of its eponymous branches of the Arsacid dynasty of Armenia, Arsacid dynasty of Iberia, and the Arsacid dynasty of Caucasian Albania.

Parthian had a significant impact on Armenian, a large part of whose vocabulary was formed primarily from borrowings from Parthian, and had a derivational morphology and syntax that was also affected by language contact but to a lesser extent. Many ancient Parthian words were preserved and now survive only in Armenian. The Semnani (or Komisenian languages) and the Zaza language have similar phonological developments with the Parthian language and may descend from the same ancestral language with Parthian, but the topic lacks sufficient research.

== Classification ==
Parthian was a Western Middle Iranian language. Language contact made it share some features of Eastern Iranian languages, the influence of which is attested primarily in loanwords. Some traces of Eastern influence survive in Parthian loanwords in Armenian. Parthian loanwords appear in everyday Armenian vocabulary; nouns, adjectives, adverbs, denominative verbs, and administrative and religious lexicons.

Taxonomically, Parthian, an Indo-European language, belongs to the Northwestern Iranian language group while Middle Persian belongs to the Southwestern Iranian language group.

== Orthography ==
The Parthian language was rendered using the Pahlavi writing system, which had two essential characteristics. First, its script derived from Aramaic, the script (and language) of the Achaemenid chancellery (Imperial Aramaic). Second, it had a high incidence of Aramaic words, which are rendered as ideograms or logograms; they were written as Aramaic words but pronounced as Parthian ones (see Arsacid Pahlavi for details).

The Parthian language was the language of the old Satrapy of Parthia and was used in the Arsacids courts. The main sources for Parthian are the few remaining inscriptions from Nisa and Hecatompylos, Manichaean texts, Sasanian multilingual inscriptions and remains of Parthian literature in the succeeding Middle Persian. The later Manichaean texts, composed shortly after the demise of the Parthian power, play an important role for reconstructing the Parthian language. Those Manichaean manuscripts contain no ideograms.

== Attestations ==
Attestations of the Parthian language include:

- Some 3,000 ostraca (pottery sherds et al.) (ca. 100–29 BC) found in Nisā in southern Turkmenistan.
- A first century AD parchment dealing with a land-sale from Awraman in Western Iran.
- The first century BC ostraca from Shahr-e Qumis in Eastern Iran.
- The poem Draxt i Asurig
- Inscription on the coins of Arsacid Kings in the first century AD.
- The bilingual inscription of Seleucia on the Tigris (150–151 AD).
- The inscription of Ardavan V found in Susa (215).
- Some third century documents discovered in Dura-Europos, on the Euphrates.
- The inscription at Kal-e Jangal, near Birjand in South Khorasan (first half of third century or later).
- The inscriptions of early Sassanian Kings and priests in Parthian including Ka'ba-ye Zartosht near Shiraz and Paikuli in Iraqi Kurdistan.
- The vast corpus of Manichaean Parthian which do not contain any ideograms.
- In North Pakistan, Indo-Parthian culture in Taxila with Gondophares 20 BC–10 BC and Abdagases, Bajaur, Khyber-Pakhtunkhwa and down in to Sistan, Balochistan.

== Samples ==
This sample of Parthian literature is taken from a Sassanian text.

A text from the Kaba of Zoroaster
Parthian	English
"Ud kaδ naxwišt pad šahr awištād ahēm, Gōrdanyos Kēsar až hamag Frōm, Gōt ud Garmāniyā šahr zāwar hangāwišn kerd; Ud ō Asūrestān abar Ērānšahr ud amā āγad, Ud pad Asūrestān marz, Pad Mišīk paddēmān wuzurg zambag būd. Gōrdanyos Kēsar ōžad, Frōmāyīn zāwar wānād, ud Frōmāyīn Filipos kēsar kerd. Ud Filipos Kēsar amā ō nemastīg āγad, Ud gyān goxn dēnār 500 hazār ō amā dād, Pad bāž awestād, ud amā Mišik až ēd kerd Pērōz-Šābuhr nām awestād, Pērōz-Šābuhr, Pērōz-Šābuhr! Ud Kēsar bid druxt ō Armin winās kerd, Ud amā abar Frōmāyīn šahr wihišt ahēm, Ud Frōmāyīn zāwar 60,000 pad Bēbāliš ōžad. Ud Asūriyā šahr, ud čē abar Asūriyā šahr parβēr būd, hamag ādurwaxt, Awērān ud wardyāz kerd ud grift pad hōēw yāwar až, Frōmāyīn šahr diz ud šahrestān."	"And when I first became established in the land, Gordian Caesar drew together an army from all the land of Rome, Gothia, and Germany; and to Asurestan he came against Iran and against me, and at the boundary of Asurestan at Mishik there was a great face-to-face battle. Gordian Caesar was killed, and the army of the Romans was destroyed, and the Romans made Philip Caesar. And Philip Caesar came to me for supplication, and for their souls gave 500,000 dinars in blood money to me, and he was established as a tributary. And because of this, Mishik gave me the name Shapur The Victorious. Shapur The Victorious, Shapur The Victorious! And Caesar lied again, [and] did harm to Armenia. And I moved against the land of the Romans, and an army of Romans 60,000 strong was killed at Bebalis. And the land of Assyria, and the land which is around Assyria, was all burned, laid waste, and plundered; and there were taken on this one occasion from the land of the Romans these fortresses and cities."

=== Differences from Middle Persian ===
Although Parthian was quite similar to Middle Persian in many aspects, clear differences in lexical, morphological and phonological forms can still be observed. In the text above, the following forms can be noticed:

- ⟨āγad⟩, came, instead of Middle Persian and Baluchi ⟨āyad⟩.
- ⟨wāxt⟩, said, instead of ⟨gōft⟩. This form for the verb to say can still be found in many contemporary Northwestern Iranian languages, e.g. Mazandarani ⟨vātεn⟩, Zazaki ⟨vatış; vaten⟩ or Sorani (witin). It is also common in Tati and Talysh, though not in Gilaki and Kurmanji.
- ⟨až⟩, from, instead of ⟨az⟩. Observe also in ⟨kanīžag⟩, handmaiden, instead of ⟨kanīzag⟩ and even in ⟨društ⟩, healthy, instead of ⟨drust⟩. The rendering of the Persian sound /z/ as /ʒ/, /tʃ/ or /dʒ/ is also very common in Northwestern Iranian languages of today.
- ⟨ay⟩, thou art, instead of ⟨hē⟩.
- ⟨zamīg⟩, land, instead of ⟨zamīn⟩. The form ⟨zamīg⟩ can be found in Balochi. The form ⟨zamin⟩ can be found in Persian.
- ⟨hō⟩, that or the, instead of ⟨(h)ān⟩.
- The abstractive nominal suffix ⟨-īft⟩ instead of ⟨-īh⟩, as in ⟨šādīft⟩, joy, Middle Persian ⟨šādīh⟩.

Other prominent differences, not found in the text above, include the personal pronoun ⟨az⟩, I, instead of ⟨an⟩ and the present tense root of the verb ⟨kardan⟩, to do, ⟨kar-⟩ instead of Middle Persian ⟨kun-⟩. Also, the Middle Persian linking particle and relative pronoun ⟨ī(g)⟩ was not present in Parthian, but the relative pronoun ⟨čē⟩, what, was used in a similar manner.

== See also ==
- Avestan language
- Old Persian language
- Middle Persian
- Persian language and history of Persian language
- Pahlavi literature
