= List of ancient Persians =

The following is a list of ancient Persians.

== Monarchs ==
=== Achaemenid dynasty ===
- Achaemenes, founder of the dynasty.
- Teispes, his son.
- Cyrus I, his son.
- Ariaramnes, son of Teispes and co-ruler of Cyrus I.
- Cambyses I, son of Cyrus I.
- Arsames, son of Ariaramnes and co-ruler of Cambyses I
- Cyrus II the Great, son of Cambyses I, ruled c. 559 – 530 BC.
- Cambyses II, his son, ruled 530 – 522 BC.
- Bardiya, his alleged brother, ruled 522 BC
- Darius the Great, his brother-in-law and grandson of Arsames, ruled 522 – 486 BC.
- Xerxes I, his son, ruled 486 – 465 BC
- Artaxerxes I, his son, ruled 465 – 424 BC.
- Xerxes II, his son, ruled 424 BC.
- Sogdianus, his half-brother and rival, ruled 424 – 423 BC.
- Darius II, his half-brother and rival, ruled 423 – 405/4 BC.
- Artaxerxes II, his son, ruled 405/4 – 359/8 BC (see also Xenophon).
- Artaxerxes III, his son, ruled 359/8 – 338 BC
- Arses, his son, ruled 338 – 336 BC
- Darius III, great-grandson of Darius II, ruled 336 – 330 BC

The epigraphic evidence for the rulers before Cyrus the Great is highly suspect, and often considered to have been invented by Darius I.

=== Parthian dynasty ===
See also Argead and Seleucid dynasty for the foreign rulers over Persia 330–247 BC BC

- Arsaces I c. 247–211 BC
  - (In some histories, Arsaces's brother Tiridates I is said to have ruled c. 246–211 BC.)
- Arsaces II c. 211–185 BC (frequently called Artabanus by early scholars)
- Phriapatius c. 185–170 BC
- Unknown king (probably the same Phraates I) c. 170–168 BC
- Phraates I c. 170–167 BC
- Mithridates I c. 167–132 BC
- Phraates II c. 132–127 BC
- Artabanus I c. 127–126 BC
- Unknown king (probably Vologases (I)) c. 126–122 BC
- Unknown king (probably Artabanus (II)) c. 122–121 BC
- Mithridates II c. 121–91 BC
- Gotarzes I c. 91–87 BC
  - Unknown king (probably Artabanus (III) or Sanatruces) c. 91–77 BC
- Mithridates (III) c. 88–67 BC
  - Orodes I c. 80–75 BC
  - Sanatruces c. 77–70 BC
  - Unknown king (probably Vardanes (I)) c. 77–66 BC
- Phraates III c. 70–57 BC
  - Unknown king c. 66–63 BC
  - Mithridates (IV) or Mithridates III c. 65–54 BC
- Orodes II c. 57–38 BC
  - Pacorus I c. 39–38 BC (co-ruler with his father Orodes II)
- Phraates IV c. 38–2 BC
  - Tiridates II c. 30–26 BC
  - Mithridates (V) c. 12–9 BC
- Phraates V (Phraataces) c. 2 BC–4 AD
  - Musa c. 2 BC–4 AD (co-ruler with her son Phraates V)
- Orodes III c. 6 AD
- Vonones I c. 8–12
- Artabanus (IV) or Artabanus II c. 10–38
  - Tiridates III c. 35–36
  - Cinnamus c. 37
- Gotarzes II c. 40–51
  - Vardanes I c. 40–47
  - Vonones II c. 45–51
  - Mithridates (VI) c. 49–50
  - Sanabares c. 50–65
- Vologases I c. 51–78
  - Vardanes II c. 55–58
  - Vologases II c. 77–80
- Pacorus II c. 78–115
  - Artabanus (V) or Artabanus III c. 80–90
- Vologases III c. 105–147
  - Osroes I c. 109–129
  - Mithridates (VII) c. 115–116 killed in battle with Trajanus's troops
  - Sanatruces II c. 116 killed in battle with Parthamaspates's troops
  - Parthamaspates c. 116
  - Mithridates (VIII) or Mithridates IV c. 129–140
  - Unknown king c. 140
- Vologases IV c. 147–191
  - Osroes II c. 190 (rival claimant)
- Vologases V c. 191–208
  - Tiridates IV c. 200
- Vologases VI c. 208–228
  - Artabanus (VI) or Artabanus IV c. 216–224

=== Sasanian dynasty, 224–651 ===
- Ardashir I from 224 to 241.
- Shapur I from 241 to 272
- Hormizd I from 272 to 273.
- Bahram I from 273 to 276.
- Bahram II from 276 to 293.
- Bahram III year 293.
- Narseh from 293 to 302.
- Hormizd II from 302 to 310.
- Shapur II from 310 to 379
- Ardashir II from 379 to 383.
- Shapur III from 383 to 388.
- Bahram IV from 388 to 399.
- Yazdegerd I from 399 to 420.
- Bahram V from 420 to 438.
- Yazdegerd II from 438 to 457.
- Hormizd III from 457 to 459.
- Peroz I from 457 to 484.
- Balash from 484 to 488.
- Kavad I from 488 to 531.
  - Jamasp from 496 to 498.
- Khosrow I from 531 to 579.
- Hormizd IV from 579 to 590.
- Khosrow II from 590 to 628.
  - Bahram VI from 590 to 591.
  - Bistam from 591 to 592.
  - Hormizd V year 593.
- Kavad II year 628.
- Ardashir III from 628 to 630.
  - Peroz II year 630.
- Shahrbaraz year 630.
- Boran and others from 630 to 632.
- Hormizd VI (or V) from 630 to 632.
- Yazdegerd III from 632 to 651.

== Satraps ==
=== Achaemenid ===
- Abrocomas
- Abulites
- Achaemenes (satrap)
- Ada of Caria
- Adusius
- Ariobarzan
- Artabazos I of Phrygia
- Artabazos II of Phrygia
- Artaphernes
- Atropates
- Camissares
- Gobryas
- Masistes
- Mithridates I of Cius
- Pharnabazus (5th century BC)
- Pharnabazus, son of Artabazus
- Phrataphernes
- Satibarzanes
- Spithridates
- Struthas
- Thyus
- Tiribazus
- Tissaphernes
- Tithraustes

== Mithridatic Dynasty of Pontus ==
- Mithridates VI Eupator

== Women ==
- Amestris
- Artystone
- Atossa wife of Darius I
- Damaspia
- Drypetis wife of Hephaestion
- Mandane of Media
- Parysatis
- Sisygambis
- Stateira (wife of Artaxerxes II)

== Religious figures ==
- Mani
- Mazdak

== Writers ==
- Aphrodisianus
