= Parthian Dark Age =

Historic period of the Parthian Empire

The so-called "Parthian Dark Age" refers to a period of three decades in the history of Parthian Empire between the death (or last years) of Mithridates II in 91 BC, and the accession to the throne of Orodes II in 57 BC, with various date ranges being mentioned by scholars. It is called a "Dark Age" due to a lack of clear information on the events of this period in the empire, except a series of, apparently overlapping, reigns.

No written source describing this period has survived, and scholars have been unable to clearly reconstruct the succession of rulers and their regnal years using the existing numismatic sources due to their ambiguities. No legal or administrative document from this period has been preserved. Multiple theories have been proposed to partially address this numismatic problem.

Based on the classical sources, the names of the rulers in this period are Sinatruces and his son Phraates (III), Mithridates (III/IV), Orodes (II), the sons of Phraates III, and a certain Darius (I), ruler of Media (or Media Atropatene?). Two other names, Gotarzes (I) and Orodes (I) are attested in dated cuneiform tablets from Babylon.

== See also ==
- Mithridates III of Parthia
