= List of monarchs of Parthia =

King of Kings of the Parthian Empire
- Imperial
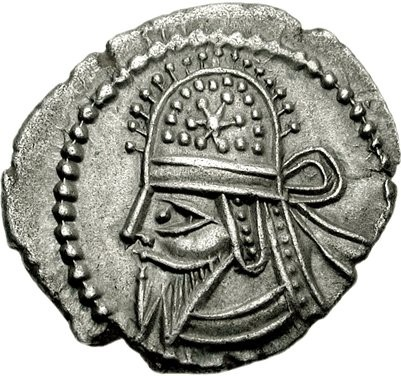
- Last to reign Artabanus IV; AD 212/213/216–224

Details
- First monarch: Arsaces I
- Last monarch: Artabanus IV
- Formed: 247 BC
- Abolished: 224 AD
- Appointer: Divine right, hereditary

The Parthian, or Arsacid, monarchs were the rulers of Iran from their victories against the Hellenistic Seleucid Empire in the 140s BC (although they had ruled a smaller kingdom in the region of Parthia for roughly a century at that point, founded by Arsaces I) until the defeat of the last Parthian king, Artabanus IV, at the Battle of Hormozdgan in AD 224. At the height of their power, the Parthian kings ruled an empire stretching from present-day central-eastern Turkey to present-day Afghanistan and western Pakistan.

== Chronology of Parthian kings ==
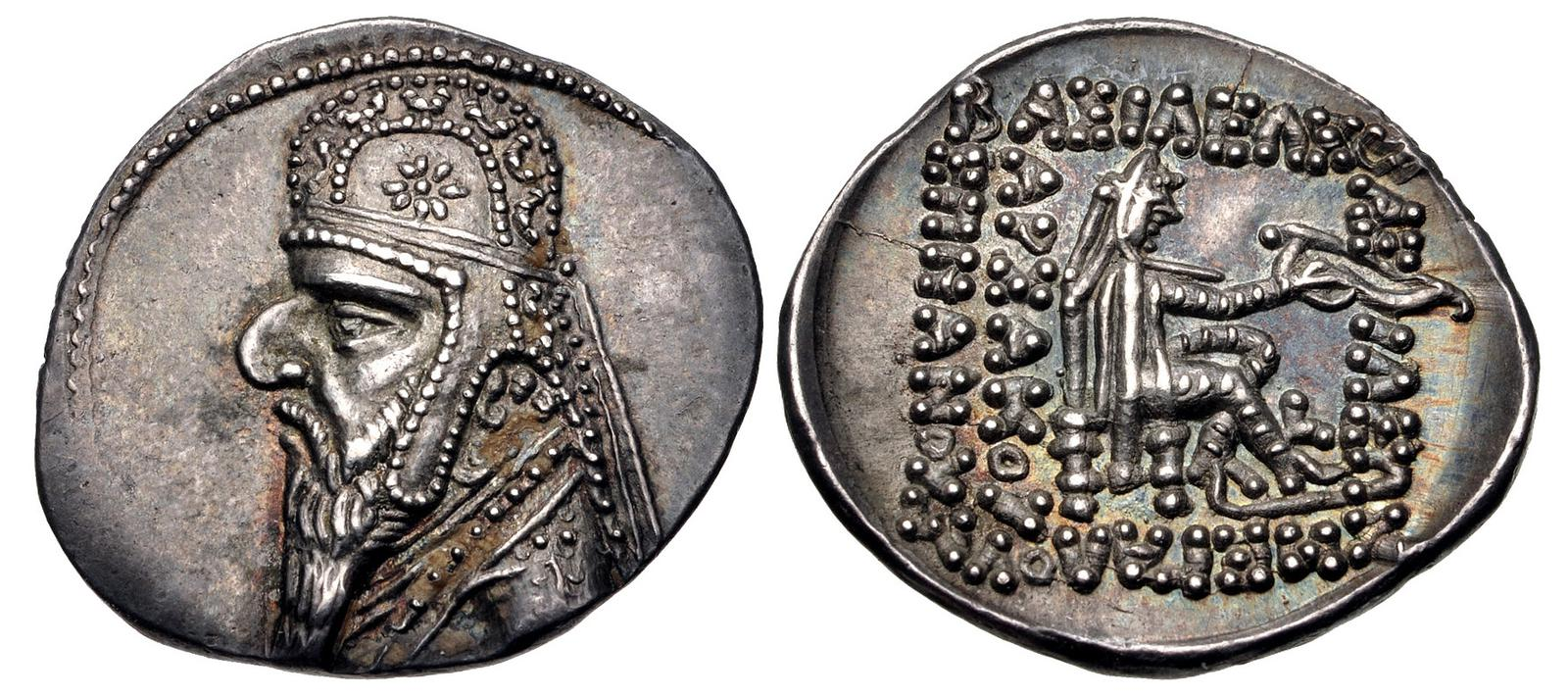
Coin of Mithridates II, which refers to him as 'the great king of kings, Arsaces, the manifest'. The Parthian royal practice of each king assuming the regnal name 'Arsaces' complicates establishing a chronology of rulers.

The rough sequence of Parthian rulers is relatively well-established from surviving literary sources and traditions, especially histories and accounts written by Roman historians, but many uncertainties exist in terms of the details. The modern understanding of the chronology and sequence of the Parthian rulers is based on surviving sources, but also on information that can be gleaned from Parthian coins, such as dates and the names of kings, which has to be reconciled with what is known from literary sources. One of the largest problems with coin analyses is that coins, especially from the earlier centuries, often give no indication as to who the king depicted is, a problem that is compounded by the lack of dates on many of the coins and the fact that all Parthian kings bore the regnal name Arsaces, which effectively was more similar to an official title, such as the Roman Caesar, than a name. The practice of all Parthian kings assuming Arsaces as their regnal name complicates establishing a chronology of rulers.

An important foundation in terms of coin studies was David Sellwood's 1971 An Introduction to the Coinage of Parthia, which (through its later editions) remains the primary mainstream basis for determining the sequence of Parthian kings. Because of the aforementioned problems with the coins giving relatively little information, Sellwood's conclusions in regards to genealogy, and in cases the sequence of rulers, was in some cases drawn only on the iconography of the coins themselves. Thus, though it remains the most widely used basis for assigning Parthian coins, Sellwood's interpretations have not gone unchallenged and alternate views exist in regards to not only dates and genealogy, but to the existence or non-existence of certain kings. Among the alternate interpretations, notable work has been conducted by researcher Gholamreza F. Assar, who has proposed alternate interpretations of many coins, resulting in an alternate, "revised", chronology of Parthian rulers. As several historians, for instance Overtoom (2020), as well as dealers of ancient coins, have taken to Assar's interpretation, rather than Sellwood's, some designations of kings are bound to lead to confusion given that certain designations are used for different kings depending on the chronology used. For instance, the king referred to as Mithridates IV by Assar is referred to as Mithridates III by Sellwood, a designation Assar uses for a completely different king. Many historians also continue to doubt Assar's chronology, preferring Sellwood's sequence of kings and dates. Some authors, for instance Ellerbrock (2021), have in their accounts of Parthian chronology chosen to represent both Sellwood's and Assar's reconstructions as equally likely views.

== List of kings ==
This list includes the regnal dates for the kings, as proposed by both Sellwood and Assar, per Ellerbrock (2021). The chronologies proposed by Touraj Daryaee (2012) and Edward Dąbrowa (2012) are also included. All dates are approximate.

Historicity contested

Portrait	King	Regnal dates				Succession and notes
Portrait	King	Sellwood (1971–80)	Assar (2011)	Daryaee (2012)	Dąbrowa (2012)	Succession and notes
	Arsaces I Aršak	247–211 BC			247–217 BC	Founder of the Arsacid dynasty. Conquered the region of Parthia from the Seleucid satrap Andragoras.
	Arsaces II; Aršak	211–191 BC	211–185 BC	211–191 BC	217–191 BC	Son of Arsaces I.
	Priapatius; Friyapat	191–176 BC	185–170 BC	191–176 BC		Grandson of a brother of Arsaces I. Priapatius may have inherited the throne over more direct descendants of Arsaces II due to Arsaces II perhaps not having any children, any possible children being underage, or perhaps because he was deemed able by Arsaces II and thus designated as heir.
	—Unknown king I— (Arsaces IV?)	—	170–168 BC	—		Grandson of Arsaces II. Per Assar's chronology, Priapatius would have designated this figure as his heir over his own sons.
	Phraates I Frahāt	176–171 BC	168–164 BC	176–171 BC		Eldest son of Priapatius, reigned briefly before dying and being succeeded by his brother Mithridates I. Phraates I is known to have had sons, perhaps because Phraates I himself designated Mithridates to be his successor, considering his brother to be more capable than his sons.
	Mithridates I Mihrdāt	171–132 BC	164–132 BC	171–138 BC	171–132 BC	Son of Priapatius. Mithridates I's conquests in Persia and Mesopotamia, and even further, transformed the regional Parthian kingdom into a true empire. Attributed the title King of Kings by Babylonian cuneiform records.
	Phraates II; Frahāt	132–127 BC		138–127 BC	132–126 BC	Son of Mithridates I. Initially under the regency of his mother, Rinnu, on account of his young age at the time of his father's death.
	Artabanus I Ardabān	127–124 BC	127–126 BC	127–124 BC	126–123/122 BC	Son of Priapatius.
	Artabanus (II) (Note: The existence of several proposed chronologies of Parthian rulers makes the numbering of kings named Artabanus especially confusing. Assar numbers the previous ruler Arsaces II (r. 211–185 BC according to Assar) as Artabanus I, which makes the king recognised by Sellwood (and this list) as Artabanus I (r. 127–124 BC or 127–126 BC) into Assar's Artabanus II. This king, Artabanus I/II's supposed son of the same name, is numbered by Assar as Artabanus III, but his existence is not recognised by Sellwood. Since Sellwood does not refer to Arsaces II as Artabanus, and does not recognise Assar's Artabanus III, he numbers the three later kings by this name as Artabanus II (r. AD 10–38), Artabanus III (r. AD 80–82) and Artabanus IV (r. AD 216–224). Assar numbers them as Artabanus IV (r. AD 10–38), Artabanus V (r. AD 79/80–85) and Artabanus VI (r. AD 212–224).); Ardabān	—	126–122 BC	—		Son of Artabanus I. Based on the work of Roman historian Justin, scholars traditionally assume that Mithridates II immediately succeeded his father Artabanus I, though Assar and some other scholars hold that coinage and cuneiform sources suggest an expanded line of succession, with Artabanus (II) possibly having been mistakenly conflated with his father of the same name.
	—Unknown king II— (Arsaces X?)	—	122–121 BC	—		Son of Artabanus (II). Proposed by Assar based on a set of coins traditionally attributed to Mithridates II. Per Assar, the coins depict a youthful and beardless ruler, which conflicts with the fully bearded and older figures depicted on the coins of Artabanus I and (II), and Mithridates II, suggesting a king between them.
	Mithridates II; Mihrdāt	124–91 BC	121–91 BC	123–88 BC	122–91 BC	Son of Artabanus I or Priapatius. First Parthian ruler who is confidently attested as having officially assumed the title King of Kings.
	Gotarzes I Gōtarz [Rival king?]	95–90 BC	91–87 BC	95–90 BC	92–? BC (Note: Dąbrowa does not state the end year of Gotarzes's reign. Scholars who do not support the existence of Mithridates III designate Orodes I as Gotarzes's direct successor. Simonetta (2001) and Shayegan (2011) both state that Gotarzes ruled until 80 BC, when he was succeeded by Orodes.)	Dates and genealogy disputed on account of the attribution of many of the coins being uncertain. Assar identifies him as a son of Mithridates II based on cuneiform sources and states that he succeeded his father in Babylonia. Daryaee identifies him as a grandson of Priapatius. According to Assar, Gotarzes's rule was contested by Sinatruces I in other parts of the empire.
	Mithridates III; Mihrdāt	—	87–80 BC	—		Son of Mithridates II (according to Assar).
	Orodes I Worōd	90–80 BC	80–75 BC	90–80 BC	—	Genealogy uncertain: Assar supports Orodes I being a son of Gotarzes I, whereas Sellwood believes him to be a son of Mithridates II on account of Orodes I in his coins wearing the same crown as Mithridates. Daryaee also supports Orodes being a brother of Gotarzes.
	—Unknown king III—	80 BC	—	—		Obscure possible ruler, per Sellwood, only known through coinage.
	—Unknown king IV— (Arsaces XVI?)	80–70 BC	78/77–62/61 BC	—		Obscure possible ruler, per Sellwood and Assar, only known through coinage.
	Sinatruces I [Rival king?]	75 BC	93/92–70/69 BC (intermittently)	77–70 BC	88/87–71/70 BC	Son of Priapatius (Sellwood and Daryaee) or Mithridates I (Assar and others). Sellwood believes him to have reigned briefly in the 70s BC, whereas Assar and Dąbrowa believe he ruled intermittently from the 90s BC to the 70s BC as a rival king, perhaps gaining full sole power in the 70s BC. He is not mentioned in Babylonian cuneiform records.
	Phraates III; Frahāt	70–57 BC	70/69–58/57 BC	70–57 BC	71/70–58/57 BC	Son of Sinatruces I. Recorded in Babylonian inscriptions, unlike his father.
	Mithridates IV; Mihrdāt	57–54 BC	58/57–55 BC	57–54 BC	58/57–54/53 BC	Son of Phraates III, murdered his father alongside Orodes II.
	Orodes II; Worōd	57–38 BC			58/57–38 BC	Son of Phraates III, aided his brother Mithridates IV in overthrowing their father, later deposed and murdered his brother to seize sole power for himself.
	Pacorus I Pakur [Junior co-ruler?]	39 BC	—			Eldest son of Orodes II. Attributed a reign by Sellwood. The extent of his royal power—whether he was a junior co-ruler alongside his father, a sole ruler, or a rival king and rebel, or if he actually ruled in the first place, is not certain.
	Phraates IV; Frahāt	38–2 BC	38/37–2 BC	38 BC – AD 2	38–3/2 BC	Son of Orodes II, chosen as successor by his father after the death of Pacorus I. Feeling his position to be uncertain, Phraates IV massacred the other children of Orodes II.
	Tiridates II (Note: Numbered as Tiridates II by counting Tiridates I, the supposed brother of Arsaces I, who never actually ruled the empire, and is believed to be entirely fictional by many modern historians. If the earlier Tiridates is not counted, this king is typically numbered as Tiridates I, with the numbering of subsequent kings by this name also being decreased.); Tīrdāt [Rival king]	29–27 BC	27 BC	—	31 BC	Part of the Arsacid dynasty but of uncertain lineage. Rival king supported by portions of the Parthian aristocracy against Phraates IV. Was able to secure control of the empire for some time, driving Phraates IV into exile, but was after a brief reign defeated by Phraates and himself driven into exile.
	Phraates V Frahāt	2 BC – AD 4	2 BC – AD 4/5	AD 2–4	3/2 BC – AD 2	Son of Phraates IV, ruled alongside his mother Musa.
	Musa	2 BC – AD 4	2 BC – AD 4/5	AD 2–4	3/2 BC – AD 2	Formerly a Roman slave girl, wife of Phraates IV and mother of Phraates V. Ruled as the Parthian Empire's first and only ruling queen, together with her son Phraates V.
	Orodes III; Worōd	AD 6	AD 6–8	AD 6	AD 4–6	Part of the Arsacid dynasty but of uncertain lineage. Believed to have been crowned by Parthian aristocrats after the deposition of Phraates V, and possibly murdered after a very brief reign. Daryaee believes Orodes was a son of Phraates IV.
	Vonones I	AD 8–12			AD 6–11/12	Son of Phraates IV.
	Artabanus II; Ardabān	AD 10–38			AD 11/12–39	Uncertain lineage, possibly the son of a daughter of Phraates IV. Proclaimed as a rival king against Vonones I in c. AD 10. Defeated Vonones in AD 12, becoming the sole ruler of the empire.
(Note: There are no known coins minted by Tiridates III.)	Tiridates III; Tīrdāt [Rival king]	AD 35–36	—	AD 35–36		Grandson of Phraates IV. Installed by the Parthian aristocracy at Ctesiphon as a rival king against Artabanus II, defeated by Artabanus after a brief reign.
	Vardanes I Wardān	AD 40–47	AD 38–46	AD 40–47	AD 39–45	Son of Artabanus II. Fought with his brother Gotarzes II over the succession to the throne after the death of their father. Initially successful, reaching a compromise in that Vardanes was to rule the empire whereas Gotarzes was to rule Hyrcania. Possibly assassinated, whereafter Gotarzes became the sole ruler.
	Gotarzes II; Gōtarz	AD 40–51	AD 44–51	AD 40–51	—	Son of Artabanus II. Fought with his brother Vardanes I over the succession to the throne after the death of their father. Sole ruler after the death of Vardanes I.
	Meherdates; Mihrdāt [Rival king]	—	AD 49–50	—	AD 49–51	Son of Vonones I. Rival king against Gotarzes II.
	Vonones II	AD 51	—	AD 51	—	Uncertain lineage, possibly the son of a daughter of Phraates IV (and a brother of Artabanus II). Ruled briefly, perhaps only with tenuous control over the empire.
	Vologases I Walgaš	AD 50–79	AD 50–54; 58–77	AD 51–78	AD 51–78/79	Uncertain lineage, possibly the son of Vonones II or a brother of Gotarzes II (i.e. a son of Artabanus II). If Vologases I was a brother of Gotarzes II, Vonones II was probably a rival king, rather than Vologases I's direct predecessor.
	Vardanes II; Wardān [Rival king]	AD 55–58		AD 54–58	AD 54/55	Son of Vardanes I. Revolted against Vologases I in Seleucia, ruling there perhaps for several years in opposition to Vologases.
	Pacorus II; Pakur	AD 75–110	AD 78–120	AD 78–105	AD 78–110	Son of Vologases I. Proclaimed co-ruler by his father while Pacorus II was still a child. Succeeded as sole ruler upon his father's death.
	Vologases II; Walgaš [Rival king]	AD 77–80	AD 76/77–79	—		Son of Vologases I. Rival king against Pacorus II. The existence of Vologases II is based on coinage, but his historicity has been questioned as the coins might be assignable to Vologases I instead.
	Artabanus III; Ardabān [Rival king]	AD 80–82	AD 79/80–85	AD 80–90	—	Son or brother of Vologases I. Rival king against Pacorus II, apparently with little support outside of Babylonia. Alternatively, if he was Pacorus II's uncle rather than brother, he may have ruled as a legitimate king during Pacorus II's minority.
	Vologases III; Walgaš	AD 105–147	AD 111–146	AD 105–147	AD 110–147	Son of Pacorus II.
	Osroes I Husraw [Rival king]	AD 109–129	AD 108/109–127/128	AD 109–129	—	Son of Pacorus II. Rival king against Vologases III, in control of the Parthian Empire's western heartlands for decades. Briefly deposed by the Romans after Emperor Trajan's victory over Parthia in AD 116, before regaining his throne.
	Parthamaspates [Roman puppet king]	AD 116	—			Son of Osroes I. Proclaimed as puppet king by the Romans, but was defeated and expelled by his father shortly after the Romans left.
	Sinatruces II [Rival king]	—	AD 116	—		Son of Mithridates V (r. 129–140). Possibly a rival king against Parthamaspates, alongside his father. Only mentioned by the Byzantine historian John Malalas, with some uncertain coin attributions, thus unclear if Sinatruces II existed in the first place.
	—Unknown king V— [Rival king]	AD 140	—	—		Part of the Arsacid dynasty but of uncertain lineage. Rival king against Vologases III, but little is known of him.
	Mithridates V Mihrdāt [Rival king]	AD 129–140	AD 128–147	AD 129–140		Uncertain lineage. Rival king against Vologases III, but little is known of him. May have earlier claimed the throne against Parthamaspates in AD 116/117, together with his son Sinatruces II.
	Vologases IV; Walgaš	AD 147–191			AD 147–191/192	Son of Mithridates V. King after the deaths of Vologases III and Mithridates V.
	Osroes II; Husraw [Rival king]	AD 190	AD 190–208	—		Part of the Arsacid dynasty but of uncertain lineage. Rival king against Vologases IV, and possibly also against Vologases V, depending on the length of his revolt. May have ruled in Parthia, with Vologases IV and Vologases V controlling Mesopotamia.
	Vologases V Walgaš	AD 191–208	AD 191–207/208	AD 191–208	AD 191/192–208	Son of Vologases IV.
	Vologases VI; Walgaš	AD 208–228	AD 207/208–221/222	AD 208–228	AD 208–221/222	Son of Vologases V. Fought for control over the empire with his brother, Artabanus IV, and appears to have lost control of most of it by c. AD 216. Vologases VI might still have ruled parts of the empire by AD 228, as coins with his name are known from that year.
	Artabanus IV; Ardabān	AD 216–224	AD 212–224	AD 216–224	AD ?–224 (Note: Dąbrowa does not state the start year of Artabanus IV's reign. There have been additional dates proposed in addition to AD 212 and AD 216, such as Chaumont and Schippmann (1988)'s suggestion of AD 213.)	Son of Vologases V. Fought with his brother Vologases VI for the throne, achieving control of the empire by c. AD 216. Artabanus IV was the last king of the Parthian Empire, being defeated by Ardashir I, who founded the Sasanian Empire, in AD 224.
	Tiridates IV; Tīrdāt [Rival king?]	AD 216–224?	—			Part of the Arsacid dynasty but of uncertain lineage. The existence of Tiridates IV is not clear. Sellwood bases the existence of this king on a second row of inscriptions on a coin of Artabanus IV, which appears to include the name Tiridates, but this reading of the text is dubious and contested.
