= Tiridates IV of Parthia =

Tiridates IV
- King of Kings
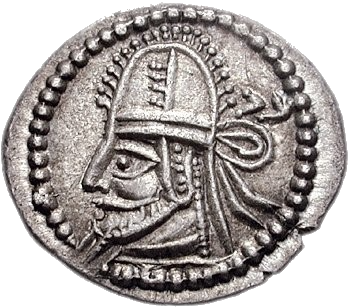
- Coin of the Arsacid king Artabanus IV, Hamadan mint. Some attribute this coin to a hypothetical Tiridates IV instead

King of Parthia?
- Reign: 216?–224
- Predecessor: Vologases VI
- Successor: Ardashir I (Sasanian); Vologases VI
- Rival king?: Artabanus IV (216–224); Vologases VI (216–224)
- Dynasty: Arsacid
- Religion: Zoroastrianism

Tiridates IV (Persian: تيرداد سوم), is an hypothetical monarch of the Parthian Empire whose entire existence is debated.

He was certainly part of the Arsacid dynasty but of uncertain lineage. The existence of Tiridates IV is not clear. Sellwood bases the existence of this king on a second row of inscriptions on a coin of Artabanus IV, which appears to include the name Tiridates, but this reading of the text is dubious and contested.

== Sources ==
- Ellerbrock, Uwe (2021). The Parthians: The Forgotten Empire. Oxford: Routledge. ISBN 978-0367481902.
