= Mithridates II of Parthia =

King of Parthia from 124 BC to 91 BC

Mithridates II 𐭌𐭕𐭓𐭃𐭕
- King of Kings; Arsaces
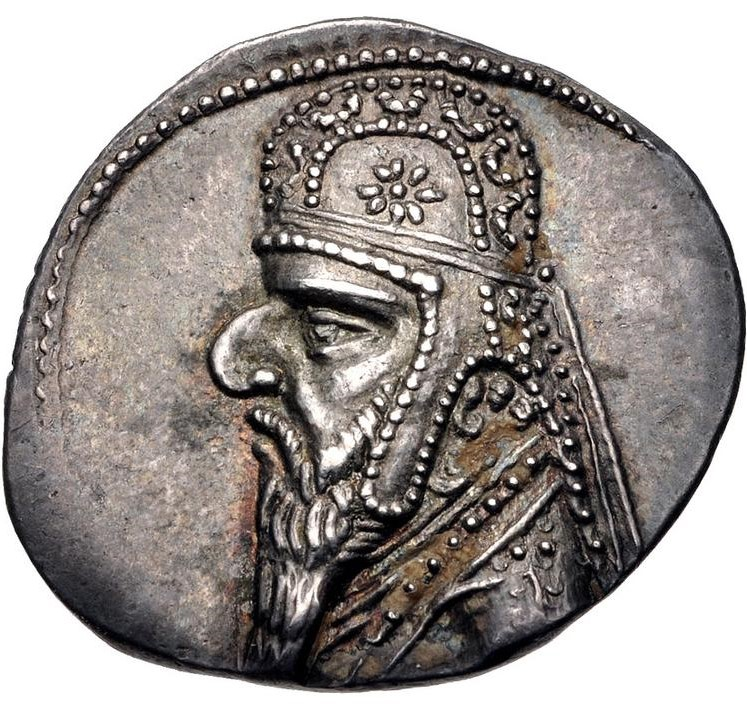
- Drachm of Mithridates II wearing a bejeweled tiara of Median heritage. Minted at Rhages between 96-92 BC

King of Parthia
- Reign: 124 – 91 BC
- Predecessor: Artabanus I
- Successor: Gotarzes I
- Died: 91 BC
- Issue: Gotarzes I Mithridates III
- Dynasty: Arsacid
- Father: Artabanus I or Priapatius
- Religion: Zoroastrianism

Mithridates II (also spelled Mithradates II or Mihrdad II; Parthian: 𐭌𐭕𐭓𐭃𐭕 Mihrdāt) was the ruler of the Parthian Empire from 124 to 91 BC. Considered one of the greatest of his dynasty to ever rule, he was known as Mithridates II the Great in antiquity.

Mithridates II was crowned king after the abrupt death of his predecessor Artabanus I. Inheriting a declining empire that was reeling from military pressure in both the east and west, Mithridates II quickly stabilized the situation in Mesopotamia by gaining the allegiance of Characene, and subduing the insurgent Kingdom of Elymais and also the Arabs, who had continuously raided Babylonia. Mithridates II was the first Parthian king to extend Parthian rule into the Caucasus, where the kingdoms of Armenia, Iberia, and possibly Caucasian Albania became Parthian vassal states. To the east, he defeated and conquered the nomadic tribes in Bactria who had killed both of his predecessors. Sakastan was also reconquered, which was given as a fiefdom to the House of Suren. In 114/113 BC, he seized Dura-Europos in Syria from the Seleucids, and by 95 BC, the northern Mesopotamian kingdoms of Adiabene, Gordyene, and Osrhoene had acknowledged his authority. Under Mithridates II, the Parthian Empire reached its zenith and extended from Syria and the Caucasus to Central Asia and India. It was under Mithridates II that the Parthian Empire for the first time established diplomatic relations with Rome and Han China.

A champion of Achaemenid traditions, Mithridates II was determined to emphasize the association of the ruling Arsacid dynasty with the Iranian Achaemenid Empire. He was the first Parthian monarch to regularly use the title King of Kings, and portray himself with an Iranian tiara on the obverse of his coins, contrary to the Hellenistic diadem used by his earlier predecessors. He also replaced the omphalos on the reverse of his coins with a highbacked throne of Achaemenid origin.

== Name ==
"Mithridates" is the Greek attestation of the Iranian name Mihrdāt, meaning "given by Mithra", the name of the ancient Iranian sun god. The name itself is derived from Old Iranian Miθra-dāta-. Mithra is a prominent figure in Zoroastrian sources, where he plays the role of the patron of khvarenah, i.e. kingly glory. Mithra played an important role under the late Iranian Achaemenid Empire, and continued to grow throughout the Greek Seleucid period, where he was associated with the Greek gods Apollo or Helios, or the Babylonian god Nabu. The role of Mithra peaked under the Parthians, which according to the modern historian Marek Jan Olbrycht, "seems to have been due to Zoroastrian struggles against the spread of foreign faiths in the Hellenistic period."

== Parentage ==
The identity of Mithridates II's father is uncertain. According to 2nd-century Roman historian Justin, Mithridates II was a son of his predecessor, Artabanus I. A cuneiform tablet from 119 BC, however, cites Mithridates II; "of the Gutians who killed my brother Artabanus, and I set up (troops) opposite them and fought it with them; a great killing I performed among them; except two men."

- Son of Priapatius: According to Vesta Sarkhosh Curtis (2019), Mithridates II was referring to Artabanus I as his brother in the cuneiform. She argues that Mithridates II was a son of Priapatius (also spelled Friapatak), which is also supported by an ostracon created in 91/90 BC in Nisa. On the ostracon, a Parthian king, most likely Mithridates II's son Gotarzes, is mentioned as "Arsaces King, grandson of Friapatak [who is] the son of the nephew of Arsaces [I]."
- Son of Artabanus I: Olbrycht (2010), however, suggests that Mithridates II was not Artabanus I's brother, but a son of his. He states that Mithridates II would have been a middle aged man the time of his accession, due to Priapatius dying in 176 BC. According to Olbrycht, "While not impossible, it is historically unlikely since Mithradates II's natural contestants for the throne would have been the sons of Phraates II and Mithridates I." Unlike Mithridates I and Artabanus I (who were the sons of Priapatius), Mithridates II did not use the title of Theopatoros ("whose father is a god"). This brother named Artabanus is not referred to as king in cuneiform, and was most likely a high-ranking officer who died in war.

== Early expeditions in Mesopotamia and the Caucasus ==
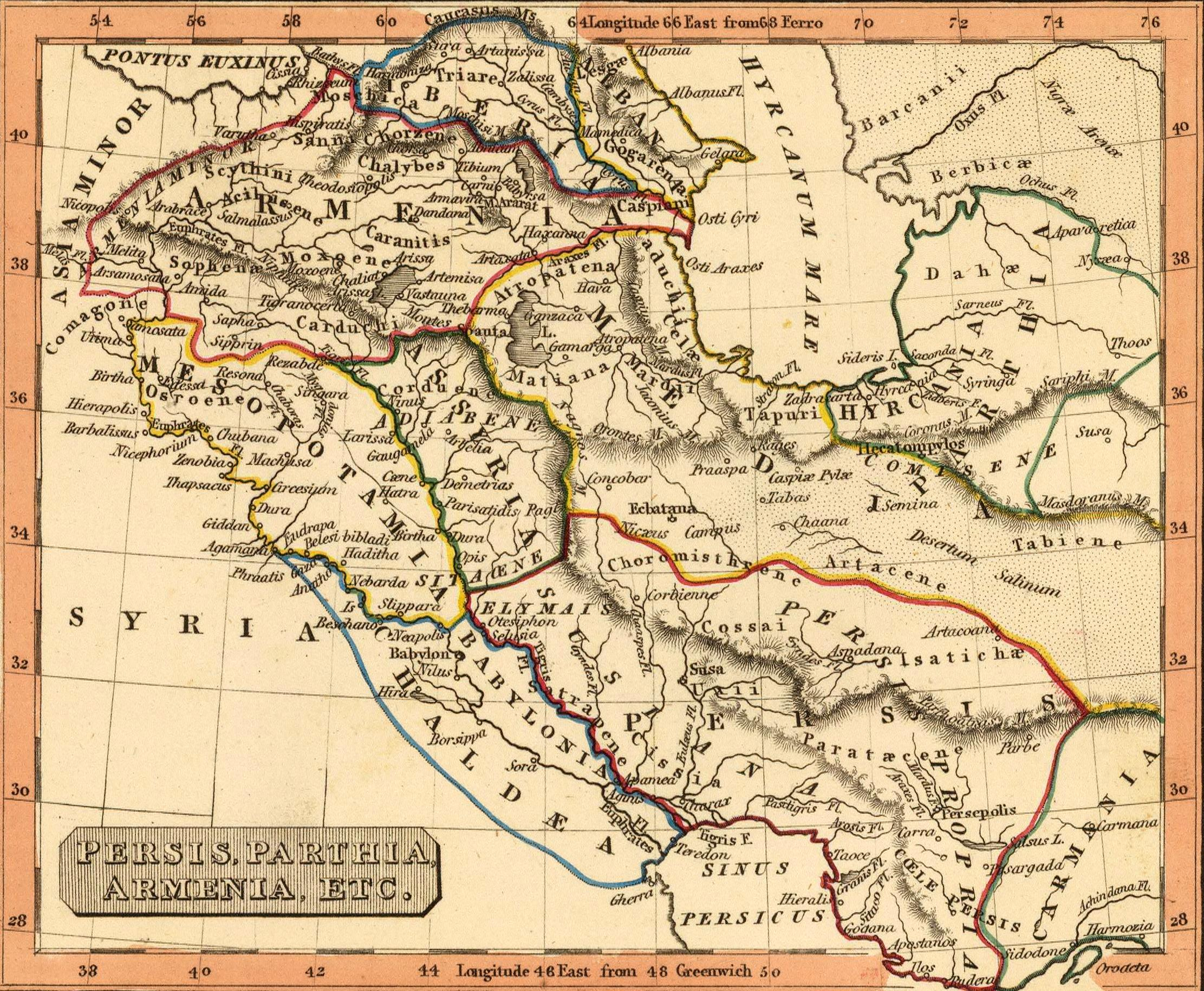
Map depicting the Near East during the Hellenistic era, by Joseph Thomas (1835)

At the time of his succession, the Parthian Empire was reeling from military pressures in the West and East. Several humiliating defeats at the hands of eastern nomads had sapped the strength and prestige of the kingdom. Mithridates II quickly gained the allegiance of the Characenean ruler Hyspaosines, who had originally fought the Parthians, and briefly seized Babylon in 127 BC. Hyspaosines returned the wooden throne of Arsaces to Mithridates II as a gift to the god Bel. Mithridates II now turned his eyes on Elymais, which had been originally under direct Parthian rule, but had been seized by the independent Elamite king Pittit after Artabanus I's death. Mithridates II invaded Elymais and captured Susa. Then he confronted Pittit in a final battle, where he defeated him and conquered Elymais. Around the same time, Hyspaosines died, and the Parthian commander Sindates was appointed as the governor of Characene.

It was first under Mithridates II that Parthian rule extended into the Caucasus. He noticed the strategic position of Armenia between Asia Minor, the Caucasus, and Iran. In c. 120 BC, Mithridates II invaded Armenia and made its king Artavasdes I acknowledge Parthian suzerainty. Artavasdes I was forced to give the Parthians Tigranes as a hostage, who was either his son or nephew. Control over Armenia would remain one of the most essential objectives in Parthian policy till the end of the dynasty. Other Caucasian kingdoms such as Iberia most likely also became a Parthian vassal state, and possibly also Caucasian Albania. Massive circulation of Parthian coins into Iberia, along with Armenia and Caucasian Albania, indicates that these kingdoms had been swayed by the influence of the Parthians. According to Babylonian documents, Babylonia was constantly suffering from raids by Arabs, which had agitated Mithridates II considerably. In the spring of 119 BC, a Parthian force inflicted a defeat on the Arabs, which was heavy enough to make them stop their raids for a period. It is unclear whether the force was led by Mithridates II or a Parthian commander. The Parthian force most likely left for Media afterwards, seemingly in order to join the upcoming expedition against the nomads in the east.

Parthian interests were also directed towards Syria, which had first been demanded by the Parthians after Phraates II (r. 132–127 BC) defeated the Seleucid king (basileus) Antiochus VII Sidetes (r. 138–129 BC) in 129 BC. In 114/113 BC, Mithridates II captured the important Seleucid city of Dura-Europos, which was situated on the Euphrates. The Seleucid realm was at this time frail and entangled in ceaseless internal strifes and struggles for power against the Nabataeans, various local kings, Jews, and Greek cities in Syria and Phoenicia.

== Wars to the east ==
According to Justin, Mithridates II avenged the death of his "parents or ancestors" (ultor iniuriae parentum), which indicates that he fought and defeated the Tocharians, who had killed Artabanus I and Phraates II. Mithridates II also reconquered western Bactria from the Scythians. Parthian coinage and scattered reports imply that Mithridates II ruled Bactra, Kampyrtepa, and Termez, which means that he had reconquered the very lands that been conquered by his namesake Mithridates I (r. 171 – 132 BC). Control over the middle Amu Darya including Amul was vital for the Parthians, in order to thwart incursions by nomads from Transoxiana, particularly from Sogdia. Parthian coins continued to be minted in western Bactria and in the middle Amu Darya until the reign of Gotarzes II (r. 40–51 AD).

Nomadic invasions had also reached the eastern Parthian province of Drangiana, where strong Saka dominions had been established, thus giving the rise to the name Sakastan ("land of the Saka"). These nomads had probably migrated to the area due to the pressure that Artabanus I and Mithridates II had been putting against them in the north. Sometime between 124 and 115 BC, Mithridates II sent an army led by a general of the House of Suren to recapture to the region. After Sakastan was incorporated back into the Parthian realm, Mithridates II rewarded the region to the Surenid general as his fiefdom. The eastern extent of the Parthian Empire under Mithridates II reached as far as Arachosia.

== Further expansions to the west, and contact with the Romans ==
Tigranes remained a hostage at the Parthian court until c. 96/95 BC, when Mithridates II released him and appointed as the king of Armenia. Tigranes ceded an area called "seventy valleys" in the Caspiane to Mithridates II, either as a pledge or because Mithridates II demanded it. Tigranes' daughter Ariazate had also married a son of Mithridates II, which has been suggested by the modern historian Edward Dąbrowa to have taken place shortly before he ascended the Armenian throne as a guarantee of his loyalty. Tigranes would remain a Parthian vassal until the end of the 80s BC. The following year, Mithridates II attacked Adiabene, Gordyene and Osrhoene and conquered these city states, shifting the western border of the Parthian realm to the Euphrates. There the Parthians encountered the Romans for the first time. In 96 BC Mithridates II sent one of his officials, Orobazus, as an envoy to Sulla. As the Romans were increasing in power and influence, the Parthians sought friendly relations with the Romans and thus wanted to reach an agreement that assured mutual respect between the two powers. Negotiations followed in which Sulla apparently gained the upper hand, which made Orobazus and the Parthians look like supplicants. Orobazus would later be executed.

== Diplomatic activity with China ==
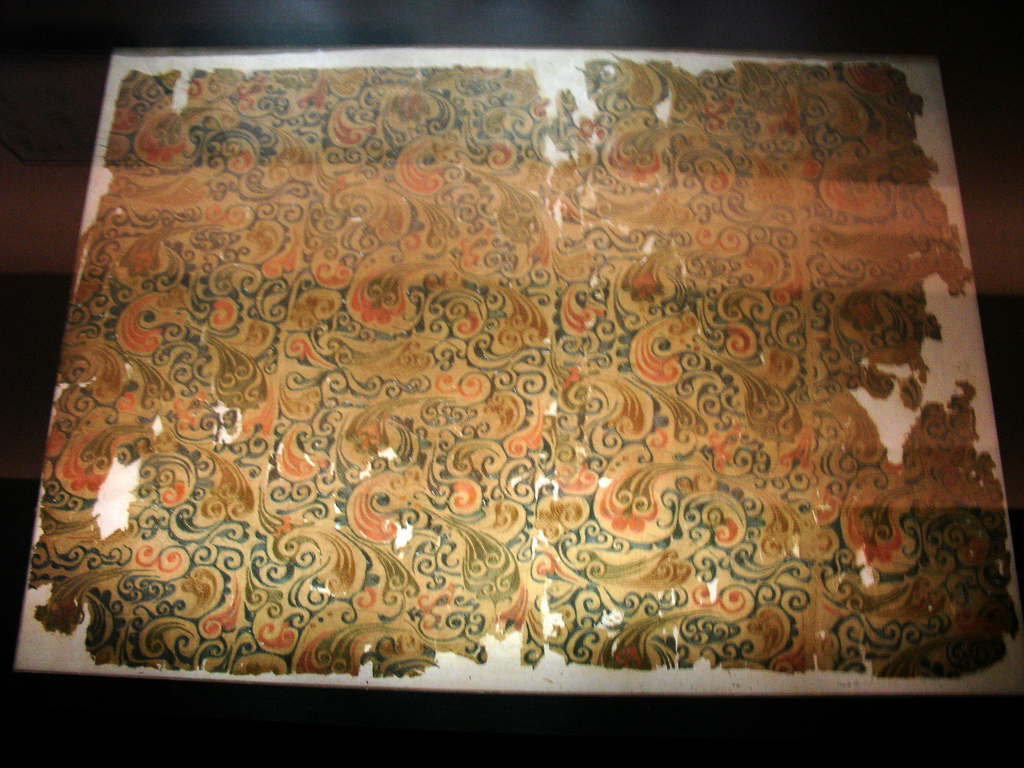
Han-dynasty Chinese silk from Mawangdui, 2nd century BC, silk from China was perhaps the most lucrative luxury item the Parthians traded at the western end of the Silk Road

In 121 BC the Chinese under Emperor Wu of Han had defeated the Xiongnu in the east and were expanding westwards in force. In Ferghana the Chinese encountered the sphere of influence of the Parthians. A Chinese delegation to the Parthian court is attested for the year 120 BC. In the following year the Silk Road was opened up to trade. The strength and welfare of the empire under Mithridates II has been described by one Chinese traveler as the following:

"Anxi [Parthia] is situated several thousand li west of the region of the Great Yuezhi. The people are settled on the land, cultivating the fields and growing rices and wheat. They also make wine out of grapes. They have walled cities like the people of Dayuan [Farghana], the region containing several hundred cities of various sizes. The kingdom, which borders the Gui [Oxus River], is very large, measuring several thousand li square. Some of the inhabitants are merchants who travel by cart or boats to neighbouring countries, sometimes journeying several thousand li. The coins of the country are made of silver and bear the face of the king. When the king dies, the currency is immediately changed and new coins issued with the face of his successor. The people keep records by writing horizontally on strips of leather. To the west lies Tiaozhi [Mesopotamia] and to the north Yancai and Lixuan [Hyrcania]. Tiaozhi [Mesopotamia] is situated several thousand li west of Anxi [Parthia] and borders the western sea [the Persian Gulf]. It is hot and damp, and the people live by cultivating the fields and planting rice. In this region live great birds which lay eggs as large as pots. The people are very numerous and are ruled by many petty chiefs. The ruler of Anxi [Parthia] gives orders to these chiefs and regards them as his vassals. The people are very skillful at performing tricks that amaze the eye."

— Sima Qian: 234–235

== Death and succession ==
Mithridates II's last years of rule took place in a period coined in scholarship as the "Parthian Dark Age", which refers to a period of three decades in the history of Parthian Empire starting from the death (or last years) of Mithridates II. It is referred to as a "Dark Age" due to the lack of clear information on the events of this period in the empire, except a series of, apparently overlapping, reigns. It is only with the beginning of the reign of Orodes II in c. 57 BC, that the line of Parthian rulers can again be reliably traced. Coins, reliefs and Babylonian astronomical diaries label Gotarzes as the son and heir of Mithridates II. According to a heavily damaged relief at Behistun, Gotarzes had served as "satrap of satraps" under his father. After the death of Mithridates II in 91 BC, Gotarzes was proclaimed king at Babylon.

The death of Mithridates II marks a period of decline for the Parthian empire. The political instability which followed along with weakened central authority resulted in significant territorial losses. Tigranes of Armenia was able to capitalise on the situation and wrestled control of a strategically significant region in Armenia which had long been part of the Parthian empire. The crisis only came to an end with the ascension of Sinatruces to the Arsacid throne.

== Rock relief ==
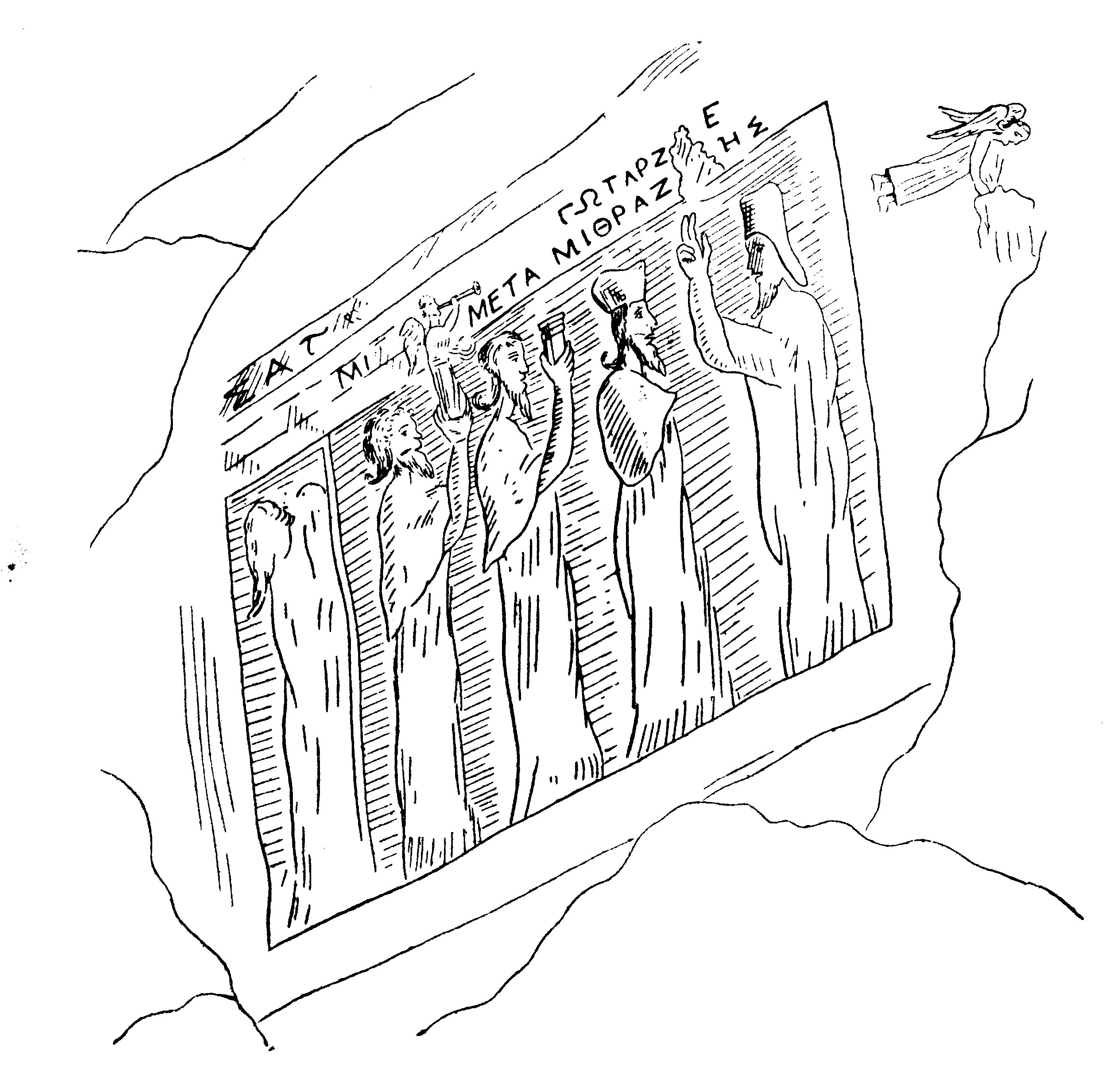
Sketch of the rock relief portraying Mithridates II and four grandees at Mount Behistun

At Mount Behistun in western Iran, there is a rock relief which depicts four figures paying respect to a fifth figure. The relief, along with its Greek inscription, heavily damaged, was partly reconstructed by the German archaeologist Ernst Herzfeld (d. 1948), and reads the following:

"Kophasates, Mithrates, [...] Gotarzes the satrap of satraps, and the great king Mithradates."

Rahim M. Shayegan has suggested, contrary to other scholars, that the rock relief was not constructed during the reign of Mithridates II, but during that of his son and successor Gotarzes, perhaps as an attempt to stress the legitimacy of his sovereignty by portraying the prestigious status of himself and his officers during Mithridates II's kingship. He identifies the first figure with the Parthian satrap Kofzad; the second figure with the Parthian commander Mitratu, who first rose to a distinguished position under Gotarzes; the third figure with Gotarzes' son and heir Orodes; and the fourth with Gotarzes himself, who served as "satrap of satraps" under his father.

== Imperial ideology and coinage ==
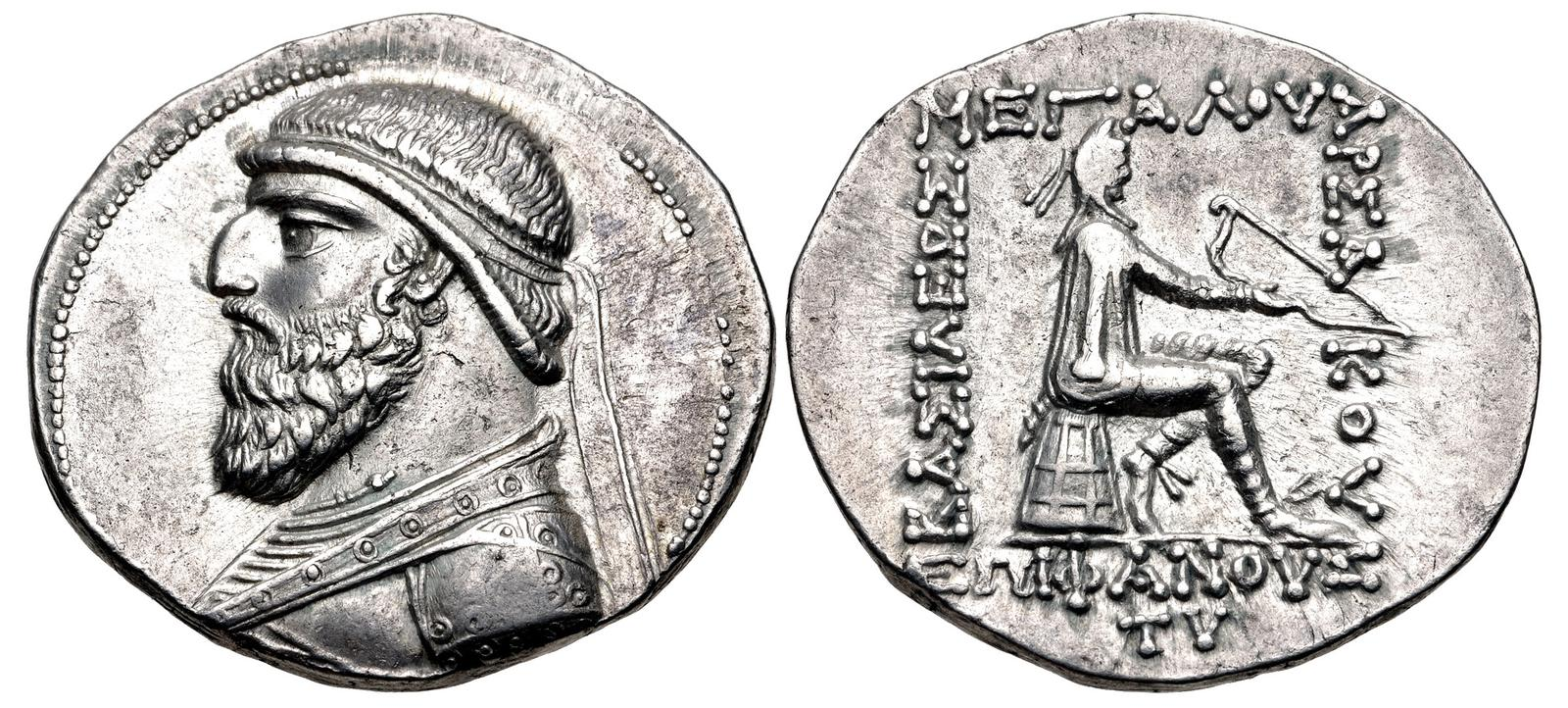
Tetradrachm of Mithridates II, Seleucia mint (between 120 and 109 BC)

Since the early 2nd-century BC, the Arsacids had begun adding obvious signals in their dynastic ideology, which emphasized their association with the heritage of the ancient Achaemenid Empire. Examples of these signs included a fictitious claim that the first Arsacid king, Arsaces I (r. 247 – 217 BC) was a descendant of the Achaemenid King of Kings, Artaxerxes II (r. 404 – 358 BC). Achaemenid titles were also assumed by the Arsacids, including the title of "King of Kings" by Mithridates I (r. 171 – 132 BC). However, the title was only infrequently used by Mithridates I, and it was first under Mithridates II, from c. 109/8 BC onwards, that the use of the title became a regular feature. The new title was used both on coins and engravings (attested in Greek as ΒΑΣΙΛΕΥΣ ΒΑΣΙΛΕΩΝ), and also Babylonian accounts, where it is attested as šar šarrāni. Mithridates II was more determined than his predecessors as heir and guardian of Achaemenid heritage.

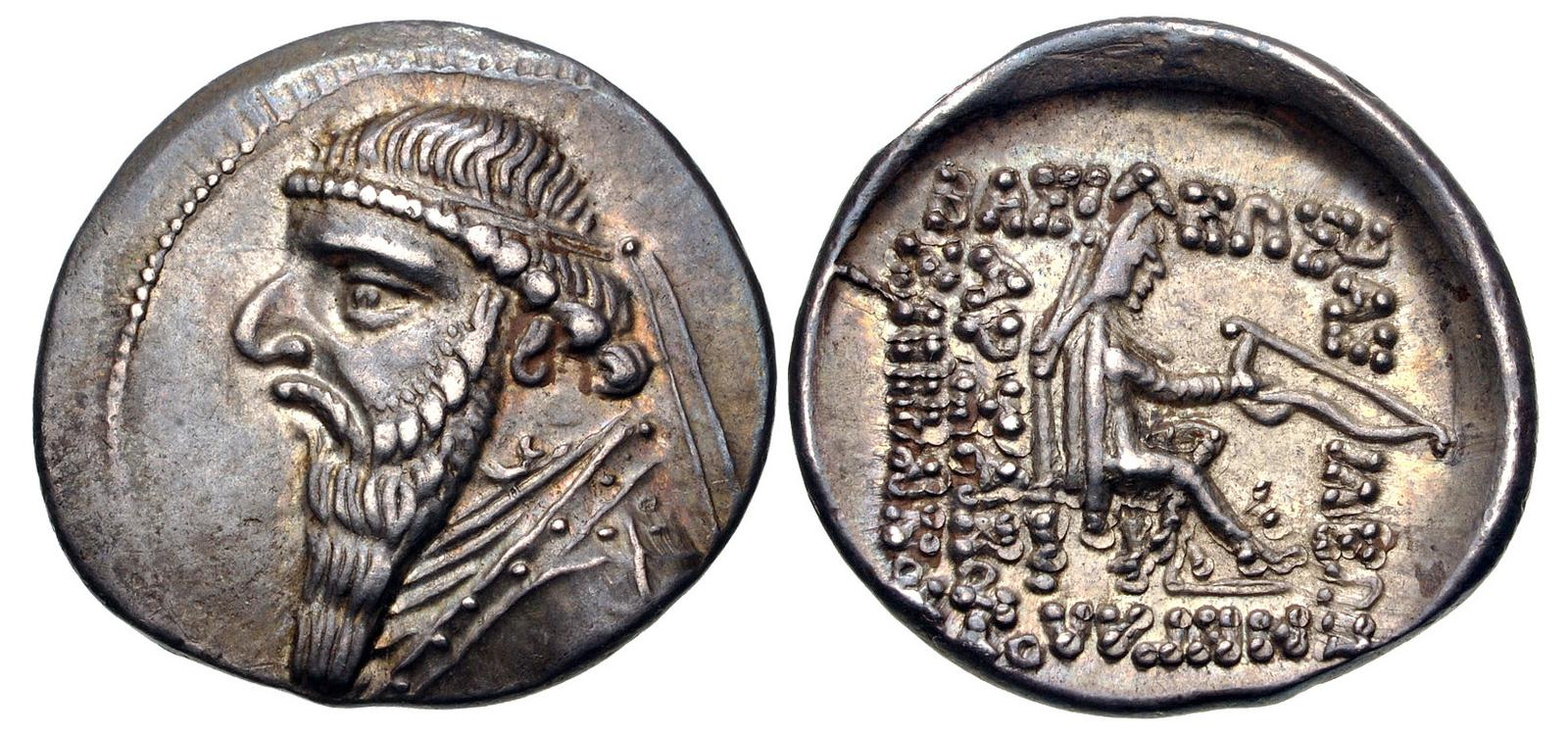
Drachm of Mithridates II wearing a diadem

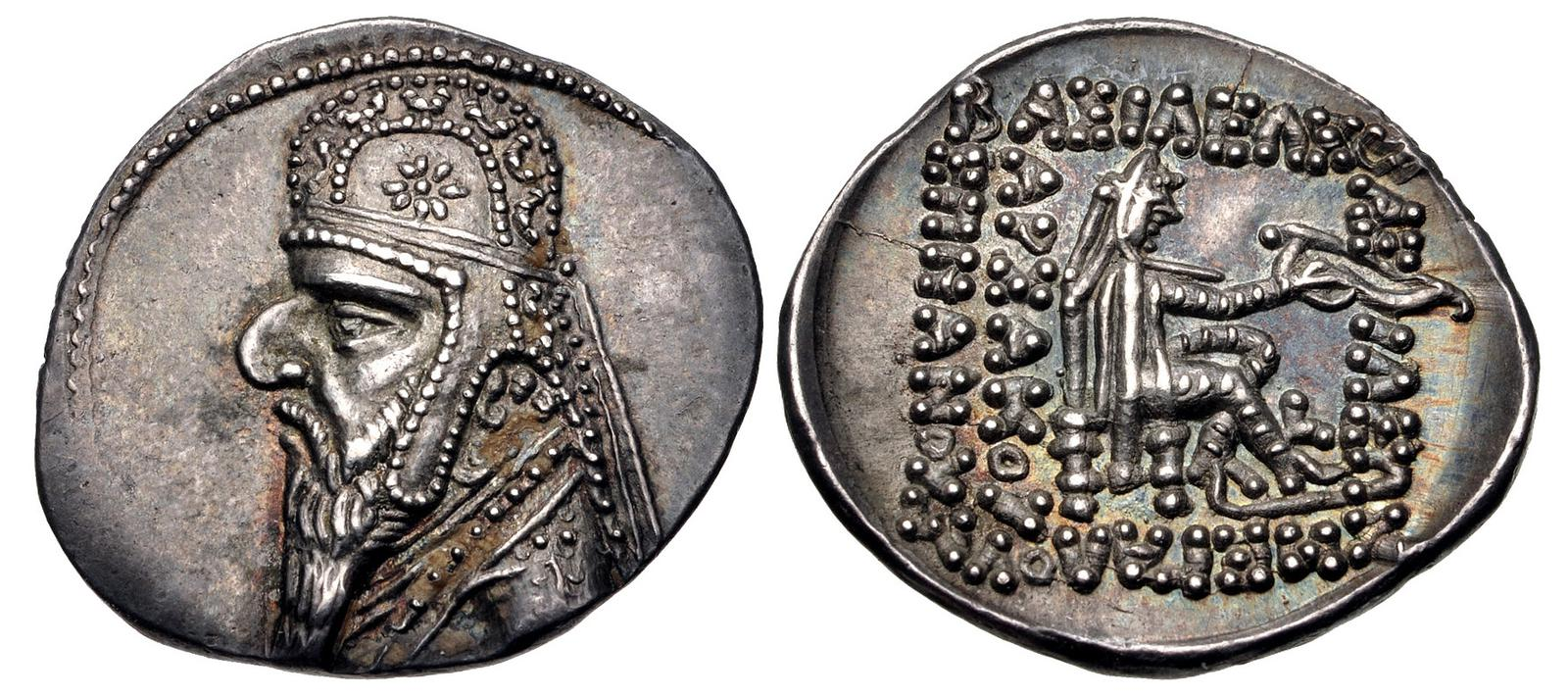
Drachm of Mithridates II wearing a tiara, minted at Rhages between 96 and 92 BC

At the start of his reign, Mithridates II briefly used the Greek title Soter ("Saviour"), which was used on his coin mints in Ecbatana and Rhages. The reason behind his use of the title is uncertain. Olbrycht (2010) has proposed that he adopted the title due to his victory over the nomads, while Grenet (2006) has proposed that Soter could be seen as a Mithraic title from an Iranian point of view, in connection to Mithra's role as a saviour in Zoroastrianism.

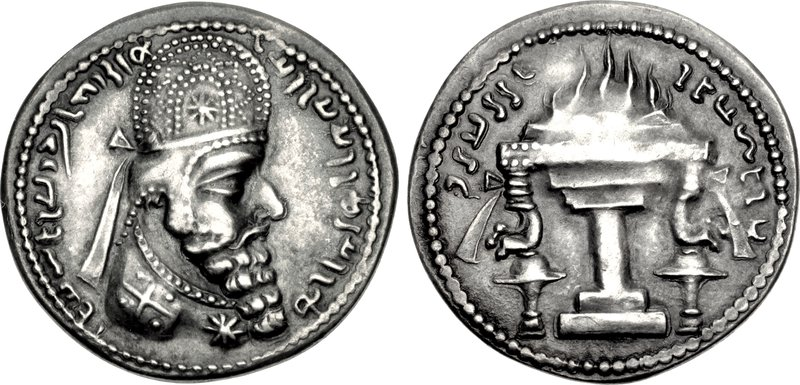
Drachm of the Sasanian king Ardashir I (r. 224–242 AD) wearing the same type of tiara used by Mithridates II

The early Arsacid monarchs are depicted on the obverse of their coins with a soft cap, known as the bashlyk, which had also been worn by Achaemenid satraps. From Mithridates I, the Hellenistic diadem was used by the Arsacid kings. The diadem was also used during the early reign of Mithridates II, until he later started using a tall bejewelled tiara or kolah (tall hat). The tiara was of Median origin; in the Achaemenid era, high ranking Median officers wore a tall, domed headdress, which was part of the Median national dress. Media, a region in central Iran which neighboured Parthia, was an important part of the Parthian realm under Mithridates II.

According to Justin, the Parthian language shared many features with Median. The Parthians admired Median customs, and seemingly got familiar with Achaemenid heritage through Media. The tiara would be used by many Parthian kings, particularly in the late Parthian period. This type of tiara was also later used by the vassal kings of the Parthians, such as the Kings of Persis. The founder of the Sasanian Empire, Ardashir I (r. 224–242 AD), also used this tiara. Like Artabanus I, Mithridates II is depicted on the obverse of his coins wearing an Iranian rider garb—the Parthian trouser-suit.

The reverse of Mithridates II's coin mints also see a major chance during his reign. Since the start of the Arsacid dynasty, the reverse of the coins had depicted a seated bowman wearing a bashlyk, which greatly resembled the coins of the Achaemenid satrap Datames (d. 362 BC). The bowman was originally depicted seated on a diphros, however, under Mithridates I this was changed to an omphalos. Tetradrachms minted at Seleucia and Susa under Mithridates II, including his early coin mints from central Iran and Marw in Margiana, maintained the same style. However, on the coins minted in Ecbatana and Rhages, a tail-like piece of fabric has been added on the back of the bowman. In 117–111 BC, the omphalos was replaced by a highbacked throne, which was originally used in the Achaemenid era. The long piece of fabric has also been removed. During military assemblies and campaigns, a horse or gorytos was depicted on the reverse of his coins.

== Assessment and legacy ==
Map of the Parthian Empire under Mithridates II

Mithridates II is viewed favourably by both ancient and modern historians, who consider him one of the greatest and successful Parthian monarchs to ever rule. Justin says the following about him;

"He was succeeded by his son Mithridates, to whom his achievements procured the surname of Great; for, being fired with a desire to emulate the merit of his ancestors, he was enabled by the vast powers of his mind to surpass their renown. He carried on many wars, with great bravery, against his neighbours, and added many provinces to the Parthian kingdom. He fought successfully, too, several times, against the Scythians, and avenged the injuries received from them by his forefathers."

== Bibliography ==
=== Primary Sources ===
- Strabo, Geographica.
- Justin (2025) [c. 225 CE]. Epitome of the Philippic History of Pompeius Trogus. Translated with notes by John Selby Watson (1853). Hastings: Delphi Publishing. ISBN 9781801702782.
- Plutarch (1859). "Life of Sylla". In John Dryden; Arthur H. Clough (eds.). The Parallel Lives. Translated by William Davies.

=== Secondary Sources ===
- Assar, Gholamreza F. (2006). "A Revised Parthian Chronology of the Period 91–55 BC". Parthica. 8: 55–104.
- Bosworth, Clifford E. (1997). "Sīstān". In Bosworth, Clifford E.; van Donzel, Emeri; Heinrichs, Wolfhart; Lecomte, Gérard (eds.). The Encyclopaedia of Islam. Vol. 9 (San-Sze) (2nd ed.). Brill. ISBN 9789004104228.
- Brosius, Maria (2006). The Persians: An Introduction. Routledge. ISBN 9780415320894.
- Dąbrowa, Edward (2012). "Ch. 6 - The Arsacid Empire". In Daryaee, Touraj (ed.). The Oxford Handbook of Iranian History. Oxford University Press. ISBN 9780199875757.
- Dąbrowa, Edward (2018). "Arsacid Dynastic Marriages". Electrum. 25: 73–83.
- Dignas, Beate; Winter, Engelbert (2007). Rome and Persia in Late Antiquity: Neighbours and Rivals. Cambridge University Press. ISBN 978-0-521-84925-8.
- Frye, Richard N. (1984). The History of Ancient Iran. C. H. Beck. ISBN 9783406093975.
- Garthwaite, Gene R. (2005). The Persians. Blackwell Publishing. ISBN 9781557868602.
- Garsoïan, Nina (2019) [2005]. "Tigran II". Encyclopaedia Iranica Online.
- Gazerani, Saghi (2015). The Sistani Cycle of Epics and Iran's National History. On the Margins of Historiography. Brill. ISBN 9789004281998.
- Kia, Mehrdad (2016). The Persian Empire: A Historical Encyclopedia. (2 volumes). ABC-Clio. ISBN 9781610693905.
- Mayor, Adrienne (2009). The Poison King: The Life and Legend of Mithradates, Rome's Deadliest Enemy. Princeton University Press. ISBN 9780691150260.
- Mørkholm, Otto (1980). "The Parthian Coinage of Seleucia on the Tigris, c. 90-55 B.C.". The Numismatic Chronicle. 20. Royal Numismatic Society: 33–47. JSTOR 42667078. (registration required)
- Olbrycht, Marek Jan (1997). "Parthian King's tiara - Numismatic evidence and some aspects of Arsacid political ideology". Notae Numismaticae. 2: 27–61.
- Olbrycht, Marek Jan (2009). "Mithridates VI Eupator and Iran". In Højte, Jakob Munk (ed.). Mithridates VI and the Pontic Kingdom. Black Sea Studies. Vol. 9. Aarhus University Press. pp. 163–190. ISBN 9788779344433.
- Olbrycht, Marek Jan (2010). "The early reign of Mithradates II the Great in Parthia". Anabasis. Studia Classica et Orientalia. 1: 144–158.
- Olbrycht, Marek Jan (2016). "The Sacral Kingship of the early Arsacids I. Fire Cult and Kingly Glory". Anabasis. Studia Classica et Orientalia. 7: 91–106.
- Rezakhani, Khodadad (2013). "Arsacid, Elymaean, and Persid Coinage". In Potts, Daniel T. (ed.). The Oxford Handbook of Ancient Iran. Oxford University Press. ISBN 978-0199733309.
- Sarkhosh Curtis, Vesta (2007). "The Iranian Revival in the Parthian Period". In Sarkhosh Curtis, Vesta; Stewart, Sarah (eds.). The Age of the Parthians. Vol. 2 - The Ideas of Iran. I.B. Tauris / SOAS Middle East Institute. pp. 7–25. ISBN 9781845114060.
- Sarkhosh Curtis, Vesta (2012). "Parthian coins: Kingship and Divine Glory". In Wick, Peter; Zehnder, Markus (eds.). The Parthian Empire and its Religions - Studies in the Dynamics of Religious Diversity (in German and English). Computus Druck Satz & Verlag. pp. 67–83. ISBN 9783940598134.
- Sarkhosh Curtis, Vesta (2019). "From Mithradat I (c. 171-138 BCE) to Mithradat II (c. 122/1-91 BCE): the Formation of Arsacid Parthian Iconography". In Moradi, Yousef (ed.). Afarin Nameh. pp. 25–31.
- Schippmann, Klaus (2016) [1986]. "Arsacids ii. The Arsacid dynasty". Encyclopaedia Iranica Online.
- Schmitt, Rüdiger (2012) [2005]. "Personal Names, Iranian iv. Parthian Period". Encyclopaedia Iranica Online.
- Sellwood, David (1976). "The Drachms of the Parthian "Dark Age"". The Journal of the Royal Asiatic Society of Great Britain and Ireland. 1 (1). Cambridge University Press: 2–25. JSTOR 25203669. S2CID 161619682.
- Sellwood, David (1983). "Minor States in Southern Iran". In Yarshater, Ehsan (ed.). The Cambridge History of Iran: The Seleucid, Parthian and Sasanian Periods. Vol. 3(1). Cambridge: Cambridge University Press. pp. 299–322. ISBN 0-521-20092-X.
- Shayegan, M. Rahim (2011). Arsacids and Sasanians: Political Ideology in Post-Hellenistic and Late Antique Persia. Cambridge University Press. ISBN 9780521766418.

Mithridates II of Parthia Arsacid dynasty Died: 91 BC
Preceded by Artabanus I	King of the Parthian Empire; 124–91 BC	Succeeded by Gotarzes I
