= Osroes of Elymais =

2nd century ruler of Elymais

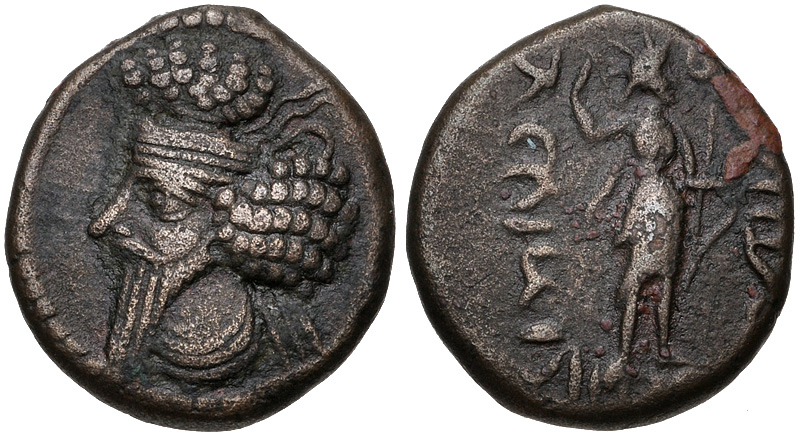
Coin of Osroes

Osroes of Elymais was the ruler of Elymais in the first quarter of the 2nd century. He may have been the same person as the contemporary Parthian contender Osroes I (r. 109–129).

== Sources ==
- Hansman, John F. (1998). "Elymais". Encyclopaedia Iranica, Vol. VIII, Fasc. 4. pp. 373–376.
- Rezakhani, Khodadad (2013). "Arsacid, Elymaean, and Persid Coinage". In Potts, Daniel T. (ed.). The Oxford Handbook of Ancient Iran. Oxford University Press. ISBN 978-0199733309.
