= Sinatruces II of Parthia =

Early 2nd century pretender to the throne of the Parthian Empire

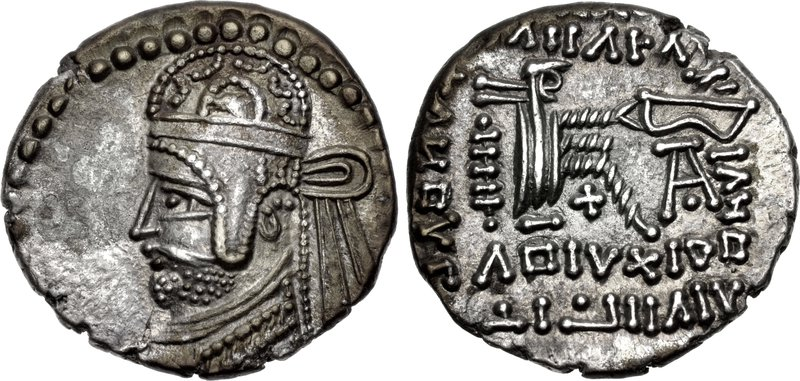
Coin of Sanatruces II

Sanatruces II of Parthia, was a pretender to the throne of the Parthian Empire during the disputed reign of his uncle Osroes I. He is only known from the writings of the Byzantine historian John Malalas (Chronographia), who is often not very reliable. The person of this ruler and the related events remain therefore enigmatic.

When Osroes was deposed by the invading Emperor Trajan in 116 in favor of the puppet ruler Parthamaspates, Sanatruces and his father, Osroes' brother Mithridates, together claimed the diadem and continued the struggle against the Romans in Mesopotamia. Trajan then marched southward to the Persian Gulf, defeated them, and declared Mesopotamia a province of the Roman Empire. After the Romans withdrew, Osroes drove out Parthamaspates and reclaimed the Parthian throne.

Mithridates V eventually succeeded Osroes about 129 and reigned to about 140, when he died in an attack on Roman Commagene. Sanatruces, whom he had appointed his successor, predeceased him, also falling in a battle with the Romans. Thus the pair's earlier "reign" during the abortive campaign of 116 proved Sanatruces' sole taste of kingship.

His father's longtime rival Vologases III took over Mithridates' realm, but another son of Mithridates, Vologases IV, eventually came to the throne after the death of Vologases III in 147.

== Ancient Sources ==
- Dio Cassius, lxviii, 17–33.
- John Malalas, Chronographia.
- Aelius Spartianus, Vita Hadrian, v, 13.
- Pausanias, v, 12.

Sinatruces II of Parthia Arsacid dynasty
Preceded by Parthamaspates	King of the Parthian Empire; 116	Succeeded by Osroes I
