= Gotarzes I =

Gotarzes I 𐭂𐭅𐭕𐭓𐭆
- Great King, Arsaces
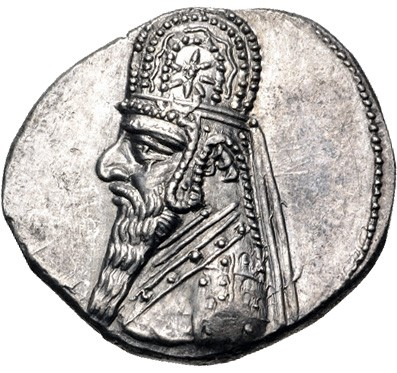
- Coin of Gotarzes I, Ecbatana mint

King of the Parthian Empire
- Reign: 91 – 87/80 BC
- Predecessor: Mithridates II (predecessor)
- Successor: Orodes I (successor); Mithridates III (?) (contender)
- Died: 87 or 80 BC
- Spouse: Asi'abatar; Ariazate; Siake; Azate
- Issue: Orodes I
- Dynasty: Arsacid dynasty
- Father: Mithridates II
- Religion: Zoroastrianism

Gotarzes I (Parthian: 𐭂𐭅𐭕𐭓𐭆 Gōdarz) was king of the Parthian Empire from 91 BC to 87 or 80 BC. He was the son and successor of Mithridates II (r. 124–91 BC), and was succeeded by his son Orodes I.

== Name ==
"Gotarzes" is from Middle Iranian Gōdarz (𐭂𐭅𐭕𐭓𐭆), itself from the Old Iranian *Gau-tarza- (literally "Ox-crusher").

== Reign ==
Coins, reliefs and Babylonian astronomical diaries label Gotarzes as the son and heir of Mithridates II (r. 124–91 BC). According to a heavily damaged relief at Behistun, Gotarzes had served as "satrap of satraps" under his father. After the death of his father, Gotarzes was proclaimed king at Babylon. At his accession, Gotarzes appointed Mitratu as the general of Babylonia. Gotarzes continued his father's policy by using their vassal, the Artaxiad king of Armenia, Tigranes the Great (r. 95–55 BC), as their representative in their efforts to extend their influence to Syria and Cappadocia. In 87/6 or 83 BC, Tigranes had seized Syria and Cilicia. Gotarzes' had several wives, one of them, Asi'abatar (also spelled Ashiabatar), is known from tablets. The other one, Ariazate, a daughter of Tigranes, was also Gotarzes' wife, and was probably the mother of Gotarzes' son Orodes I. Gotarzes had two sister-wives, Siake and Azate.

Gotarzes used the title of Great King. Furthermore, like the rest of the Parthian kings, he used the title of Arsaces on his coinage, which was the name of the first Parthian ruler Arsaces I (r. 247 – 217 BC), which had become a royal honorific among the Parthian monarchs out of admiration for his achievements. There is not enough evidence that indicate Gotarzes used the title of King of Kings. Under Gotarzes I and Orodes I, Babylonian scholars notably followed wrote cuneiform records in the same method that had been done in era of the Iranian Achaemenid Empire. According to Shayegan, this was done to emphasize the association of the Parthians with their Achaemenid predecessors.

Several hypotheses have been proposed regarding the end of Gotarzes' rule: According to Gholamreza F. Assar, Gotarzes' died in 87 BC and was succeeded by Orodes I, whose throne was shortly usurped by a brother of Gotarzes, named Mithridates III. According to M. Rahim Shayegan and Alberto M. Simonetta, Gotarzes died in 80 BC and was succeeded by Orodes I. Simonetta suggests that Mithridates III was not a contender of the throne during the reign of Orodes I, but that of Gotarzes, who eventually defeated Mithridates III in 87 BC. Shayegan, to the contrary of Assar and Simonetta, does not support the existence of Mithridates III, and has suggested that it was Gotarzes, and not Mithridates III, who defeated and captured the Seleucid king Demetrius III Eucaerus (r. 96–87 BC) in 87 BC.

== Rock relief ==
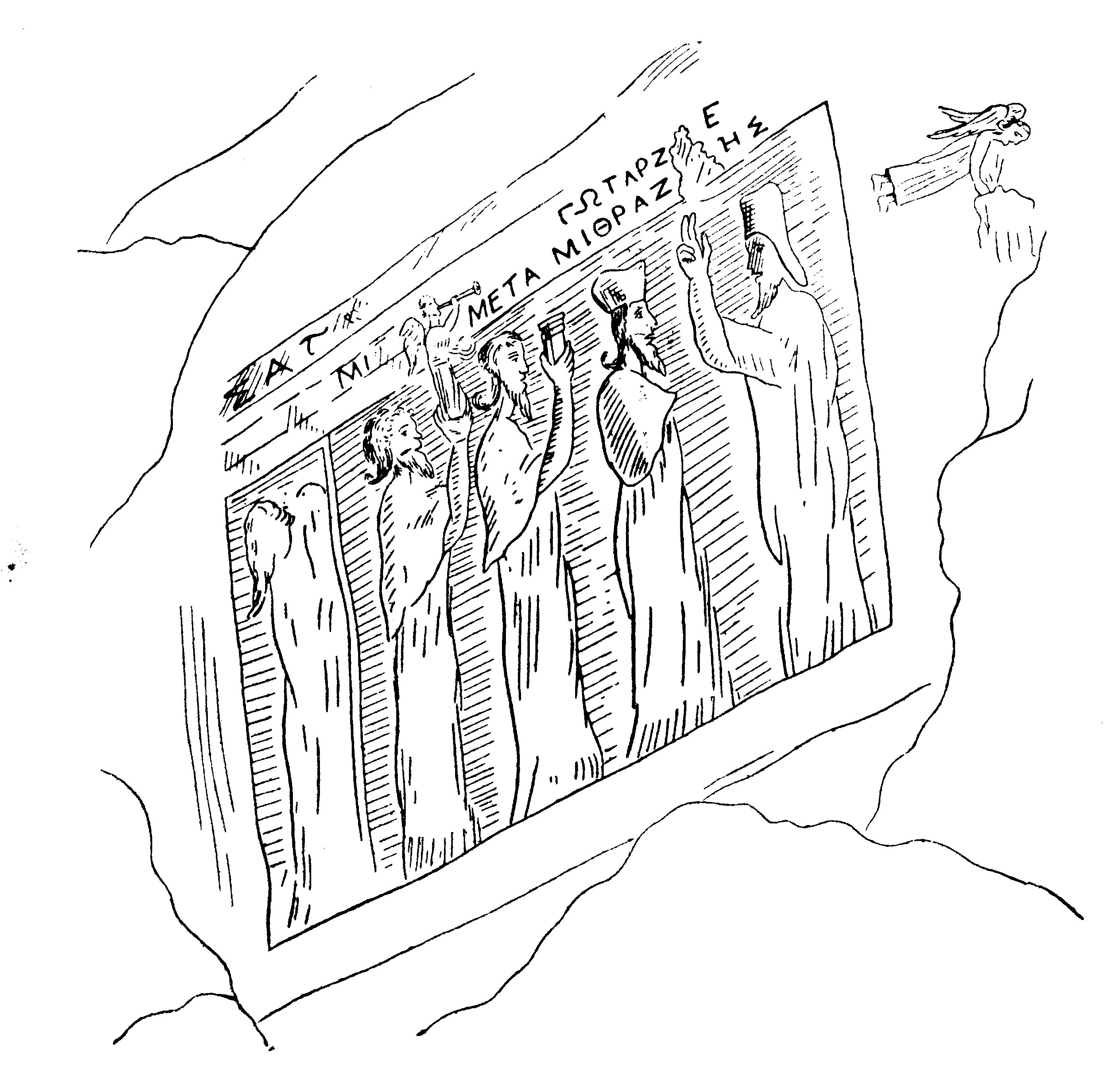
Sketch of the rock relief portraying Mithridates II and four grandees at Mount Behistun

At Mount Behistun in western Iran, there is a rock relief which depicts four figures paying respect to a fifth figure. The relief, along with its Greek inscription, heavily damaged, was partly reconstructed by the German archaeologist Ernst Herzfeld (d. 1948), and reads the following:

"Kophasates, Mithrates, [...] Gotarzes the satrap of satraps, and the great king Mithradates."

Rahim M. Shayegan (2011), has suggested, contrary to other scholars, that the rock relief was not constructed during the reign of Mithridates II, but during that of his son and successor Gotarzes, perhaps as an attempt to stress the legitimacy of his sovereignty by portraying the prestigious status of himself and his officers during Mithridates II's kingship. He identifies the first figure with the Parthian satrap Kofzad; the second figure with the Parthian commander Mitratu, who first rose to a distinguished position under Gotarzes; the third figure with Gotarzes' son and heir Orodes; and the fourth with Gotarzes himself, who served as "satrap of satraps" under his father.

== Sources ==
- Assar, Gholamreza F. (2006). A Revised Parthian Chronology of the Period 91-55 BC. Parthica. Incontri di Culture Nel Mondo Antico. Vol. 8: Papers Presented to David Sellwood. Istituti Editoriali e Poligrafici Internazionali. doi:10.4000/abstractairanica.26562. ISBN 978-8-881-47453-0. ISSN 1128-6342.
- Dąbrowa, Edward (2012). "The Arsacid Empire". In Daryaee, Touraj (ed.). The Oxford Handbook of Iranian History. Oxford University Press. pp. 1–432. ISBN 978-0-19-987575-7. Archived from the original on 2019-01-01.
- Kia, Mehrdad (2016). The Persian Empire: A Historical Encyclopedia [2 volumes]. ABC-CLIO. ISBN 978-1610693912.
- MacKenzie, David Neil (1986). "Some Names from Nisa" (PDF).
- Rezakhani, Khodadad (2013). "Arsacid, Elymaean, and Persid Coinage". In Potts, Daniel T. (ed.). The Oxford Handbook of Ancient Iran. Oxford University Press. ISBN 978-0199733309.
- Shayegan, M. Rahim (2011). Arsacids and Sasanians: Political Ideology in Post-Hellenistic and Late Antique Persia. Cambridge University Press. pp. 1–539. ISBN 9780521766418.
- Simonetta, Alberto M. (2001). "A Proposed Revision of the Attributions of the Parthian Coins Struck during the So-called 'Dark Age' and Its Historical Significance". East and West. 51 (1/2). Istituto Italiano per l'Africa e l'Oriente (IsIAO). ISSN 0012-8376.

Gotarzes I Arsacid dynasty Died: 87 or 80 BC
Preceded by Mithridates II	King of the Parthian Empire; 91–87 or 80 BC	Succeeded by Orodes I
