= Aphrodisianus =

Aphrodisianus (Ancient Greek: Ἀφροδισιανός) was a Persian man who wrote in Ancient Greek a work called Description of the East (or A Picture of the World), a fragment of which is given by the 17th century philologist Charles du Fresne, sieur du Cange. An extract from this work is said to exist in the royal library at Vienna (now the Austrian National Library).

He was also quoted as a reference in the Chronicle of Hippolytus of Thebes and in the anonymous work known as the Ravenna Cosmography.

Aphrodisianus also wrote a historical work on the Christian Mary. Some speculate that this Aphrodisianus was a different author from the one who wrote Description of the East.
