= Ariazate =

Ariazate (also spelled Aryzate or Aryazate, meaning "Child of an Iranian"), also known as Automa, was a Parthian queen consort as the wife of the Parthian monarch Gotarzes I (r. 91–87/80 BC).

She was an Artaxiad princess of Armenia as the daughter of the Artaxiad king Tigranes the Great (r. 95–55 BC).

According to Zoroastrian law, the king could marry several women, all of whom were normally given the Greek title “basilissa” (“queen”), as well as legitimate wives without a title and have sons considered legitimate with the palace slave women and Greek hetaira used to entertain in his banquets, but no hierarchy is known for the queen-wives.

Ariazate was possibly the mother of Gotarze's son and successor Orodes I (r. 87/80–75 BC).

== Sources ==
- Assar, Gholamreza F. (2006). A Revised Parthian Chronology of the Period 91-55 BC. Vol. 8: Papers Presented to David Sellwood. Istituti Editoriali e Poligrafici Internazionali. ISBN 978-8-881-47453-0. ISSN 1128-6342.
- Dąbrowa, Edward (2018). "Arsacid Dynastic Marriages". Electrum. 25: 73–83. doi:10.4467/20800909EL.18.005.8925.
- Højte, Jakob M. (2009). Mithridates VI and the Pontic Kingdom. ISD LLC. ISBN 978-87-7934-443-3.
- Romeny, R. B. ter Haar (2010). Religious Origins of Nations?: The Christian Communities of the Middle East. Brill. ISBN 9789004173750.
- Russell, James R. (1987). Zoroastrianism in Armenia. Harvard University, Department of Near Eastern Languages and Civilizations and National Association for Armenian Studies and Research. ISBN 978-0674968509.
