= Orodes I of Parthia =

Orodes I 𐭅𐭓𐭅𐭃
- Great King, Arsaces
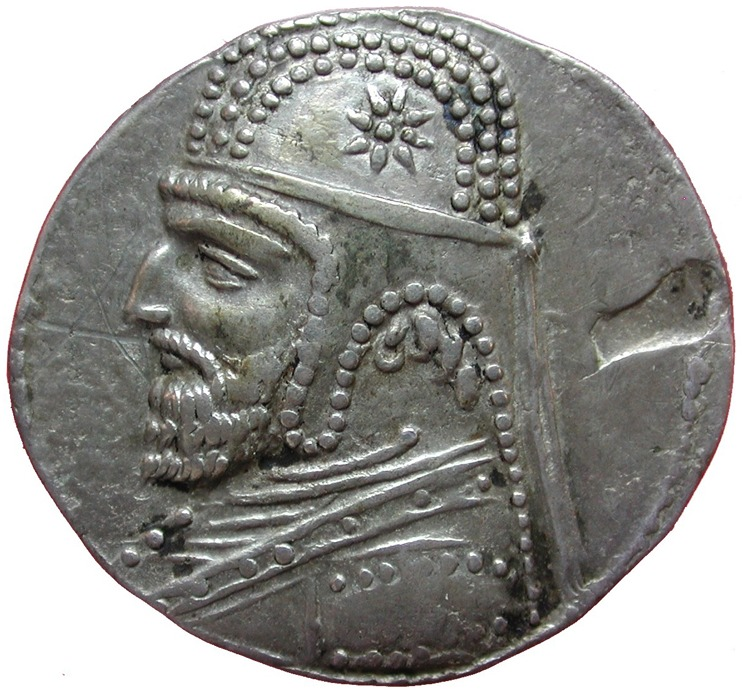
- Tetradrachm of Orodes I, Seleucia mint

King of the Parthian Empire
- Reign: 80–75 BC
- Predecessor: Gotarzes I Mithridates III (?) (rival king)
- Successor: Sinatruces
- Died: 75 BC
- Spouse: Ispubarza
- Dynasty: Arsacid dynasty
- Father: Gotarzes I
- Mother: Ariazate (?)
- Religion: Zoroastrianism

Orodes I (also spelled Urud I; Parthian: 𐭅𐭓𐭅𐭃 Wērōd/Urūd), was king of the Parthian Empire from 80 to 75 BC. He was the son and heir of Gotarzes I (r. 91–87/80 BC). His reign is relatively obscure. His throne may have been usurped in 87–80 BC by his supposed uncle Mithridates III, however, this has found little support in scholarship. Of his military activities, it is known that Orodes I re-established Parthian rule in Elymais in 78 BC, which had been independent since 81/80 BC. Orodes I later lost the throne to the aged Parthian prince Sinatruces, who belonged to a different branch of the royal Arsacid family.

== Name ==
Orōdēs (Ὀρώδης) is the Greek attestation of the Middle Iranian name Wērōd/Urūd (𐭅𐭓𐭅𐭃). The etymology of the name is disputed. The Modern Persian version is Viru (ویرو).

== Biography ==
Orodes was the son and heir of Parthian king Gotarzes I (r. 91–87/80 BC). Rahim M. Shayegan (2011) has suggested that Orodes was one of the figures depicted on the rock relief of Gotarzes I at Mount Behistun. Orodes' mother may have been the Armenian queen Ariazate, who was a daughter of Tigranes the Great (r. 95–55 BC).

According to Gholamreza F. Assar (2006), after the death of Gotarzes I in 87 BC, his brother Mithridates III usurped the throne from Orodes. In August/September 80 BC, Mithridates III was dethroned in Babylon, and was shortly afterwards expelled from Susa by Orodes. Mithridates III may have survived this event and managed to flee to the north, where he continued fighting until he died the following year. Other scholars, however, do not support the existence of a Mithridates III ruling in the 80s BC. According to Shayegan, the existence of rival kings such as Mithridates III during this period "repose primarily upon numismatic evidence, may find scant support in the literary and documentary sources, and can be contradicted by a diverging interpretation of the period's coinage." Shayegan deduced that Gotarzes I reigned till his death in c. 80 BC, and was succeeded by Orodes I.

Orodes I reigned during a period coined in scholarship as the "Parthian Dark Age," which refers to a period of three decades in the history of Parthian Empire starting from the death (or last years) of Mithridates II (r. 124–91 BC). It is referred to as a "Dark Age" due to the lack of clear information on the events of this period in the empire, except a series of, apparently overlapping, reigns. It is only with the beginning of the reign of Orodes II in c. 57 BC, that the line of Parthian rulers can again be reliably traced.

The majority of Orodes I's coins were minted in Ecbatana and Rhagae in central Iran. He is mentioned as king of the Arsacid dynasty in a Babylonian report of the lunar eclipse of 11 April 80 BC. Babylonian chronicles also made mention of his sister-queen, Ispubarza. It is unknown if they were full siblings; marriage with half-siblings was not considered incestuous amongst the members of the Iranian Achaemenid dynasty. It is uncertain if the Parthians continued the same practice of half-sibling marriage, due to lack of convincing documentation. While Orodes I's grandfather, Mithridates II, used the title of King of Kings, it remains uncertain whether he himself used the title or not. It is however certain that he used the titles of Great King and Arsaces. Under Gotarzes I and Orodes I, Babylonian scholars notably wrote cuneiform records in the same method that had been done in era of the Achaemenid Empire. According to Shayegan, this was done to emphasize the association of the Parthians with their Achaemenid predecessors. (Note: Orodes I, for example, was recorded in cuneiforms as Aršakā / Aršakam (šarru/šar šarrāni) ša ițțarridu Urudā (šarru); "Arsaces (king/king of kings) who is called Urud, (king)", closely resembling the Achaemenid variant Umakuš/Aršu ša Artakšatsu šarru/šar mātāti šumšu nabu; "Ochos/Arses who is called Artaxerxes king/king of the lands)

The kingdom of Elymais in south-western Iran had since 124 BC been under complete Parthian control. However, in 81/80 BC, coins of king Kamnaskires III and his wife Anzaze appears, which indicates that the kingdom had been restored. According to Babylonian sources, Orodes I launched an expedition into Elymais in 78 BC, where he defeated Kamnaskires III. Kamnaskires III was not deposed, however, and continued ruling the kingdom, now as a Parthian vassal.

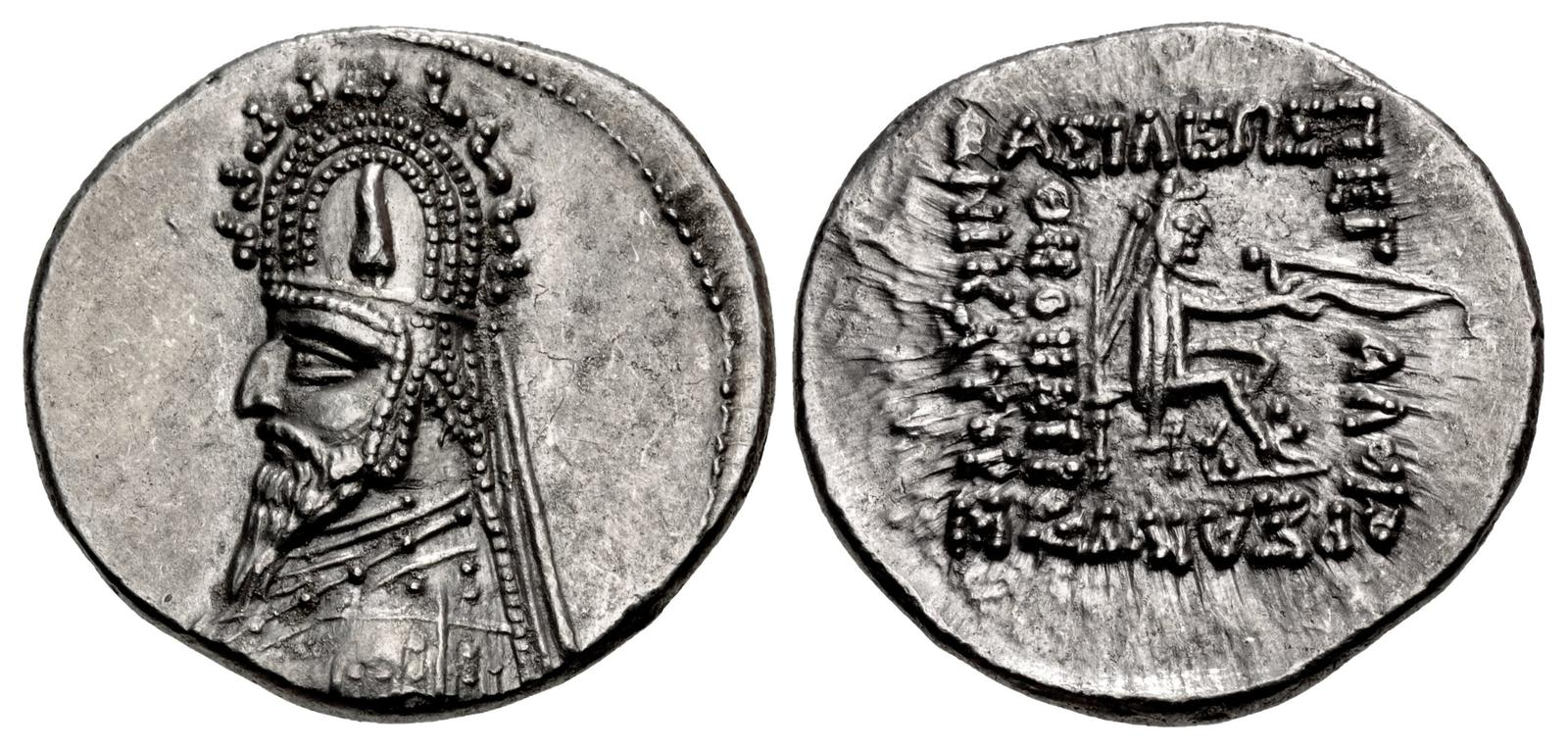
Drachm of Sinatruces (r. 75–69 BC)

Sinatruces, an aged Parthian prince named who originally resided amongst the Saka of Central Asia, enlisted the aid of his hosts, and captured the Parthian throne in c. 75 BC, thus succeeding Orodes I. Unlike Orodes I, Sinatruces was not a descendant of Mithridates II. Sinatruces thus ousted the line of Mithridates II with his own; the name of the Arsacid branch established by Sinatruces on the Parthian throne has been coined by the modern historian Marek Jan Olbrycht as the "Sinatrucids", which ruled the Parthian Empire till 12 AD. The Sinatrucid family was notably supported by the Suren clan of Sakastan.

== Sources ==
- al-Rayhani, Ali ibn 'Ubayda (2006). Moshen Zakeri (ed.). Persian Wisdom in Arabic Garb (2 vols.). Vol. 66. Brill.
- Assar, Gholamreza F. (2006). A Revised Parthian Chronology of the Period 91-55 BC. Vol. 8: Papers Presented to David Sellwood. Istituti Editoriali e Poligrafici Internazionali. ISBN 978-8-881-47453-0. ISSN 1128-6342.
- Bivar, A.D.H. (1968). "The Political History of Iran Under the Arsacids". In Fischer, William B. (ed.). The Cambridge History of Iran. Vol. 3a. Cambridge: Cambridge University Press. pp. 21–99. ISBN 0-521-06935-1.
- Brosius, Maria (2000). "Women i. In Pre-Islamic Persia". Encyclopaedia Iranica, Vol. London et al.
- Curtis, Vesta Sarkhosh (2012). "Parthian coins: Kingship and Divine Glory". The Parthian Empire and its Religions. Computus Druck Satz & Verlag. pp. 67–83. ISBN 9783940598134.
- Gazerani, Saghi (2015). The Sistani Cycle of Epics and Iran's National History: On the Margins of Historiography. BRILL. pp. 1–250. ISBN 9789004282964.
- Marcato, Enrico (2018). Personal Names in the Aramaic Inscriptions of Hatra. Digital Publishing. ISBN 9788869692314.
- Mørkholm, Otto (1980). "The Parthian Coinage of Seleucia on the Tigris, c. 90-55 B.C.". The Numismatic Chronicle. 20. Royal Numismatic Society: 33–47. JSTOR 42667078. (registration required)
- Olbrycht, Marek Jan (2015). "Arsacid Iran and the nomads of Central Asia – Ways of cultural transfer". Complexity of Interaction along the Eurasian Steppe Zone in the First Millenium CE. Bonn Contributions to Asian Archaeology. Vol. 7. Bonn. pp. 333–390.
- Olbrycht, Marek Jan (2016). "Dynastic Connections in the Arsacid Empire and the Origins of the House of Sāsān". In Curtis, Vesta Sarkhosh; Pendleton, Elizabeth J.; Alram, Michael; Daryaee, Touraj (eds.). The Parthian and Early Sasanian Empires: Adaptation and Expansion. Oxbow Books. ISBN 9781785702082.
- Sellwood, David (1976). "The Drachms of the Parthian "Dark Age"". The Journal of the Royal Asiatic Society of Great Britain and Ireland. 1 (1). Cambridge University Press: 2–25. doi:10.1017/S0035869X00132988. JSTOR 25203669. S2CID 161619682. (registration required)
- Shayegan, M. Rahim (2011). Arsacids and Sasanians: Political Ideology in Post-Hellenistic and Late Antique Persia. Cambridge University Press. pp. 1–539. ISBN 9780521766418.

Orodes I of Parthia Arsacid dynasty Died: 75 BC
Preceded by Gotarzes I	King of the Parthian Empire; 80–75 BC	Succeeded by Sinatruces
