= Artabanus IV of Parthia =

Ruler of Parthian Empire from c. 213 to 224

Artabanus IV
- King of Kings; Arsaces
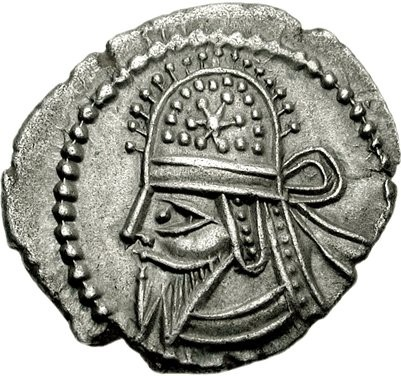
- The portrait of Artabanus IV on the obverse of a Parthian drachm, Hamadan mint

King of Parthia
- Reign: 213–224
- Predecessor: Vologases VI
- Successor: Ardashir I (Sasanian)
- Died: 28 April 224; Hormozdgan (possibly Ram-Hormoz)
- Issue: Artavazdes; Murrod; Archak
- Dynasty: Arsacid
- Father: Vologases V
- Religion: Zoroastrianism

Artabanus IV, also known as Ardavan IV (Parthian: 𐭓𐭕𐭐𐭍), incorrectly known in older scholarship as Artabanus V, was the last monarch of the Parthian Empire from c. 213 to 224. He was the younger son of Vologases V, who died in 208.

Artabanus IV rebelled against his brother, Vologases VI, a few years after the latter succeeded their father as king. He was able to take control of most of the Parthian territories, although his brother continued to rule over a reduced principality. He fought off an invasion by the Roman emperor Caracalla in 217, preserving Parthian control over most of Mesopotamia. He then faced a rebellion in Persis by Ardashir, a local dynast. Artabanus's and Ardashir's armies met in April 224 at the Battle of Hormozdgan, where Artabanus was killed and his army was defeated. Ardashir then went on to conquer the rest of the Parthian Empire, inaugurating the rule of the Sasanian dynasty over Iran.

== Name ==
Artabanus is the Latin form of the Greek Artábanos (Ἁρτάβανος), itself from the Old Persian *Arta-bānu ("the glory of Arta."). The Parthian and Middle Persian variant was Ardawān (𐭓𐭕𐭐𐭍).

== Reign ==
=== Dynastic struggles and war with the Romans ===
In c. 208, Vologases VI succeeded his father Vologases V as king of the Parthian Empire. His rule was unquestioned for a few years, till his brother Artabanus IV rebelled. The dynastic struggle between the two brothers most likely started about 213. Artabanus successfully conquered much of the empire, including Media and Susa. Vologases VI seems to have only managed to keep Seleucia, where he minted coins. The Roman emperor Caracalla sought to take advantage of the conflict between the two brothers. He tried to find a pretext to invade the Parthian Empire by requesting Vologases to send two refugees—a philosopher named Antiochus and a certain Tiridates, who was possibly either an Armenian prince or an uncle of Vologases. To the surprise of the Romans, Vologases had the two men sent to Caracalla in 215, thus denying him his pretext. Caracalla's choice of contacting Vologases instead of Artabanus shows that the Romans still saw him as the dominant king.

Caracalla then chose to invade Armenia. He appointed a freedman named Theocritus as the leader of the invasion, which eventually ended in disaster. Caracalla then once again sought to start a war with the Parthians. In another attempt to gain a pretext, he requested Artabanus to marry his daughter, which he declined. It is disputed whether Caracalla's proposal was sincere or not. Caracalla's choice to contact Artabanus shows that the latter was now considered the dominant king over Vologases, who would rule a small principality centered around Seleucia until 221/2. Artabanus soon clashed with Caracalla, whose forces he managed to contain at Nisibis in 217. Peace was made between the two empires the following year, with the Arsacids keeping most of Mesopotamia. However, Artabanus still had to deal with his brother Vologases, who continued to mint coins and challenge him.

=== War with the Sasanians ===
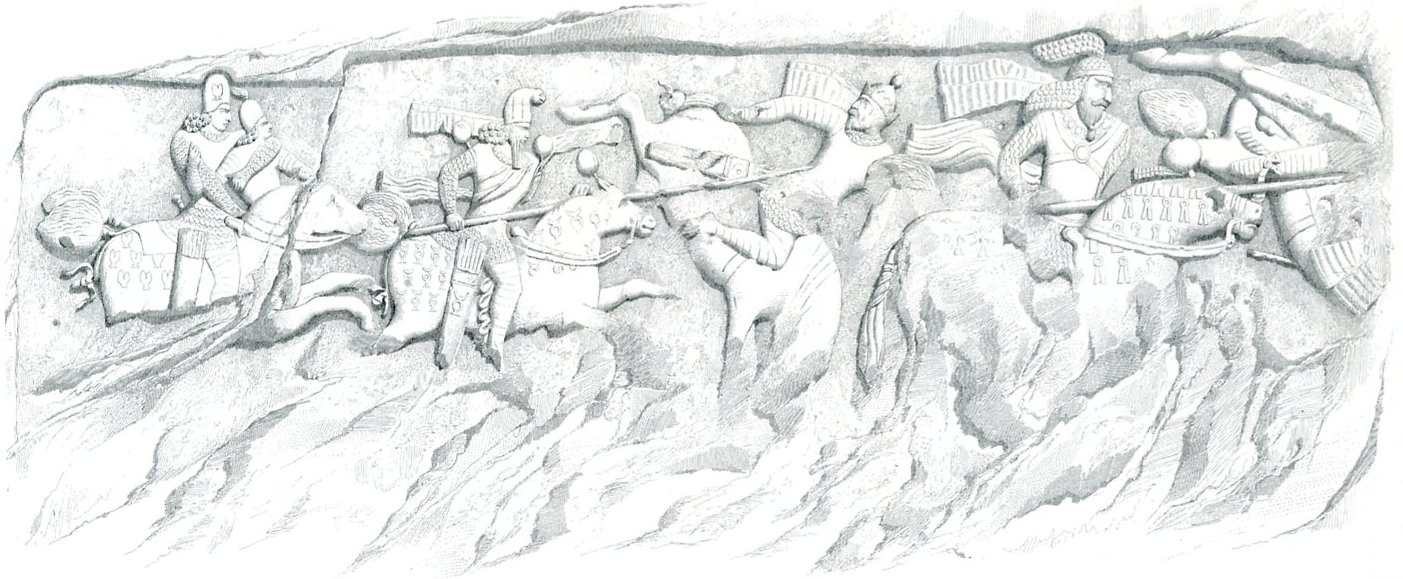
1840 illustration of a Sasanian relief at Firuzabad, showing Ardashir I's victory over Artabanus IV and his forces.

The Sasanian family had meanwhile quickly risen to prominence in their native Pars, and had now under prince Ardashir I begun to conquer the neighboring regions and more distant territories, such as Kirman. At first, Ardashir I's activities did not alarm Artabanus, until later, when the Arsacid king finally chose to confront him. According to al-Tabari, whose work was probably based on Sasanian sources, Ardashir I and Artabanus agreed to meet in Hormozdgan at the end of the month of Mihr (April). Nonetheless, Ardashir I went to the place before due time to occupy an advantageous spot on the plain. There he dug out a ditch to defend himself and his forces. He also took over a spring at the place. Ardashir I's forces numbered 10,000 cavalry, with some of them wearing flexible chain armor akin to that of the Romans. Artabanus led a greater number of soldiers, who, however, were at a disadvantage because of their inconvenient lamellar armor. Ardashir I's son and heir, Shapur I, as portrayed in the Sasanian rock reliefs, also took part in the battle. The battle was fought on 28 April 224, with Artabanus being defeated and killed, marking the end of the Arsacid era and the start of 427 years of Sasanian rule.

==== Aftermath ====
The chief secretary of Artabanus, Dad-windad, was afterwards executed by Ardashir I. Thenceforth, Ardashir I assumed the title of shahanshah ("King of Kings") and started the conquest of an area which would be called Iranshahr (Ērānshahr). He celebrated his victory by having two rock reliefs sculptured at the Sasanian royal city of Ardashir-Khwarrah (present-day Firuzabad) in his homeland, Pars. The first relief portrays three scenes of personal fighting; starting from the left, a Persian aristocrat seizing a Parthian soldier; Shapur impaling the Parthian minister Dad-windad with his lance; and Ardashir I ousting Artabanus IV. The second relief, conceivably intended to portray the aftermath of the battle, displays the triumphant Ardashir I being given the badge of kingship over a fire shrine from the Zoroastrian supreme god Ahura Mazda, while Shapur and two other princes are watching from behind. The Middle Persian text Kar-Namag i Ardashir i Pabagan reports that Ardashir married a daughter of Artabanus, who gave birth to his heir Shapur. (Note: The story goes that the daughter of Artabanus, now Ardashir's wife, is provoked by her brothers to poison Ardashir. The poisoning plot is revealed, and Ardashir orders the execution of his wife, despite the fact that she is pregnant. A mobad secretly saves and hides the woman, who gives birth to Shapur. Seven years later, Ardashir regrets his deed, and the mobad reveals to him that his son his still alive. Richard Stoneman writes that this story follows an old, recurring pattern and matches the account of Cyrus the Great's birth found in Herodotus. A similar account of Shapur's birth is recorded in the works of al-Tabari, al-Dinawari, Ferdowsi's Shahnameh, and the Nihayat al-arab. C. E. Bosworth states that Shapur I "must have been born well before the defeat of Ardawan and the overthrow of the Arsacids.") This account, if not entirely fictional, may preserve the memory of a marriage between Ardashir and a princess of the Arsacid house or possibly just a noblewoman linked with the Parthian nobility.

Vologases VI was driven out of Mesopotamia by Ardashir I's forces soon after 228. The leading Parthian noble-families (known as the Seven Great Houses of Iran) continued to hold power in Iran, now with the Sasanians as their new overlords. The early Sasanian army (spah) was identical to the Parthian one. Indeed, the majority of the Sasanian cavalry were composed of the very Parthian nobles that had once served the Arsacids. Memories of the Arsacid Empire never completely vanished, with efforts trying to restore the empire in the late 6th century made by the Parthian dynasts Bahram Chobin and Vistahm, which ultimately proved unsuccessful.

== Sources ==
- Al-Tabari, Abu Ja'far Muhammad ibn Jarir (1985–2007). Yarshater, Ehsan (ed.). The History of Al-Ṭabarī. Albany, NY: State University of New York Press. 40 vols.
- Jackson Bonner, Michael Richard (2020). The Last Empire of Iran. Gorgias Handbooks. Piscataway, N.J.: Gorgias Press. ISBN 978-1-4632-0616-1.
- Chaumont, M. L.; Schippmann, K. (1988). "Balāš VI". In Yarshater, Ehsan (ed.). Encyclopædia Iranica. Vol. III/6: Baḵtīārī tribe II–Banān (Online ed.). Encyclopædia Iranica Foundation. pp. 574–580.
- Daryaee, Touraj (2014). Sasanian Persia: The Rise and Fall of an Empire. I.B.Tauris. pp. 1–240. ISBN 978-0857716668.
- Dandamayev, M. A. (1986). "Artabanus (Old Persian proper name)". In Yarshater, Ehsan (ed.). Encyclopædia Iranica. Vol. II/6: Art in Iran I–ʿArūż (Online ed.). Encyclopædia Iranica Foundation. pp. 646–647.
- The Kârnâmê î Artakhshîr î Pâpakân: being the oldest surviving records of the Zoroastrian emperor Ardashîr Bâbakân, the founder of the Sâsânian dynasty in Irân (in English, Gujarati, and Pahlavi). Notes, introduction, and appendices by Darab Dastur Peshotan Sanjana. Bombay. 1896.
- McDonough, Scott (2013). "Military and Society in Sasanian Iran". In Campbell, Brian; Tritle, Lawrence A. (eds.). The Oxford Handbook of Warfare in the Classical World. Oxford University Press. pp. 1–783. ISBN 9780195304657.
- Rajabzadeh, Hashem (1993). "Dabīr". In Yarshater, Ehsan (ed.). Encyclopædia Iranica. Vol. VI/5: Čūb-bāzī–Daf(f) and Dāyera (Online ed.). Encyclopædia Iranica Foundation. pp. 534–539.
- Schippmann, K. (1986a). "Artabanus (Arsacid kings)". In Yarshater, Ehsan (ed.). Encyclopædia Iranica. Vol. II/6: Art in Iran I–ʿArūż (Online ed.). Encyclopædia Iranica Foundation. pp. 647–650.
- Schippmann, K. (1986b). "Arsacids ii. The Arsacid dynasty". In Yarshater, Ehsan (ed.). Encyclopædia Iranica. Vol. II/5: Armenia and Iran IV–Art in Iran I (Online ed.). Encyclopædia Iranica Foundation. pp. 525–536.
- Shahbazi, A. Shapur (2004). "Hormozdgān". In Yarshater, Ehsan (ed.). Encyclopædia Iranica. Vol. XII/5: Homosexuality III–Human migration II (Online ed.). Encyclopædia Iranica Foundation. pp. 469–470.
- Shahbazi, A. Shapur (2005). "Sasanian dynasty". In Yarshater, Ehsan (ed.). Encyclopædia Iranica (Online ed.). Encyclopædia Iranica Foundation.
- Shahbazi, A. Shapur (2002). "Šāpur I". In Yarshater, Ehsan (ed.). Encyclopædia Iranica. Encyclopaedia Iranica (Online ed.). Encyclopædia Iranica Foundation.
- Shahbazi, A. Shapur (1989). "Besṭām o Bendōy". In Yarshater, Ehsan (ed.). Encyclopædia Iranica. Vol. IV/2: Behruz–Bibliographies II (Online ed.). Encyclopædia Iranica Foundation. pp. 180–182.
- Shahbazi, A. Shapur (1988). "Bahrām VI Čōbīn". In Yarshater, Ehsan (ed.). Encyclopædia Iranica. Vol. III/5: Bahai Faith III–Baḵtīārī tribe II (Online ed.). London et al.: Encyclopædia Iranica Foundation. pp. 514–522.
- Stoneman, Richard (2012). "Persian Aspects of the Romance Tradition". In Stoneman, Richard (ed.). The Alexander Romance in Persia and the East. Ancient Narrative. Groningen: Barkhuis Publishing. pp. 3–18. ISBN 978-94-91431-04-3.
- Yarshater, E. (1982). "Abarsām". In Yarshater, Ehsan (ed.). Encyclopædia Iranica. Vol. I/1: Āb–ʿAbd-al-Hamīd (Online ed.). Encyclopædia Iranica Foundation. pp. 67–68.
- Wiesehöfer, Joseph (1986). "Ardašīr I i. History". In Yarshater, Ehsan (ed.). Encyclopædia Iranica. Vol. II/4: Architecture IV–Armenia and Iran IV (Online ed.). Encyclopædia Iranica Foundation. pp. 371–376.

Artabanus IV of Parthia Arsacid dynasty Died: 28 April 224
Preceded by Vologases VI	King of the Parthian Empire; 208–224	Succeeded by Ardashir I (Sasanian Empire)
