= Adusius =

6th and 5th-century Persian satrap

- Αδούσιος
- Military career
- Allegiance: Cyrus the Great
- Other work: Satrap of Caria

Adusius (Old Persian Āδušya, Ancient Greek Αδούσιος) was, according to the account of Xenophon in his Cyropaedeia, sent by Cyrus the Great with an army into Caria, to put an end to the feuds which existed in the country. He afterwards assisted Hystaspes in subduing Phrygia, and was made satrap of Caria, as the inhabitants had requested.
