= Parthamaspates of Parthia =

2nd century Roman client king in Mesopotamia and of Osroene

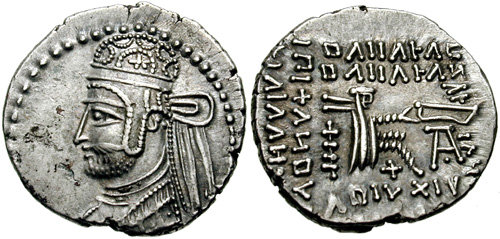
Tetradrachm of Parthamaspates.

Parthamaspates was a Parthian prince who ruled as a Roman client king in Mesopotamia, and later of Osroene during the early second century AD. He was the son of the Parthian emperor Osroes I.

== Biography ==
Parthamaspates was a member of the Arsacid dynasty.

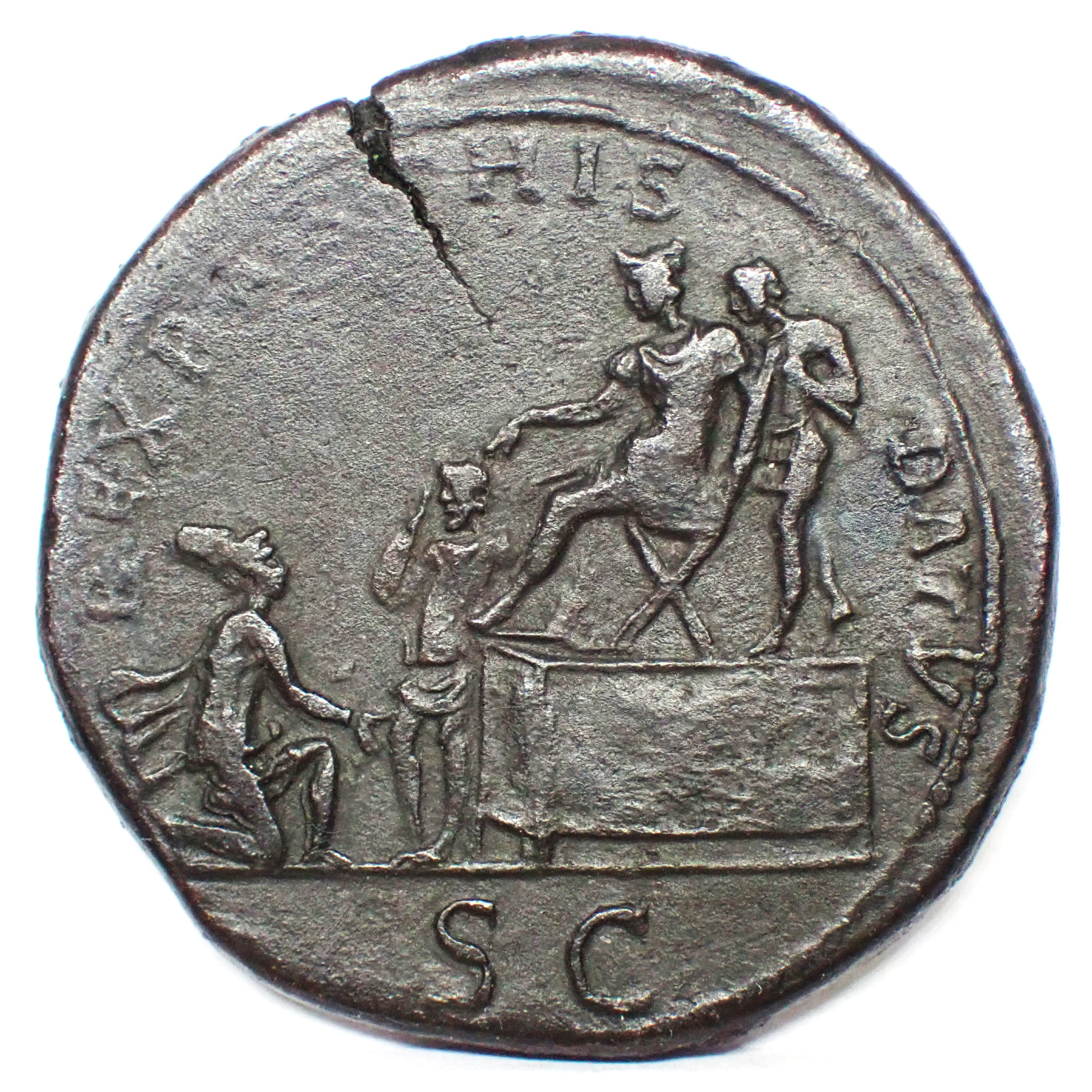
A kneeling Parthia presents Parthamaspates to Trajan

After spending much of his life in Roman exile, Parthamaspates accompanied Emperor Trajan on the latter's campaign to conquer Parthia. Trajan originally planned to annex Ctesiphon as part of the Roman Empire, but ultimately decided instead to place Parthamaspates on his father's throne as a Roman client, doing so in 116. Much of the Parthian land Trajan conquered was in open rebellion by the time he returned to Babylon. He crowned Parthamaspates as king before returning to Antioch. His reign lasted around six months. Following the Roman withdrawal from the area, Osroes easily defeated Parthamaspates and reclaimed the Parthian throne.

After Parthamaspates' defeat in Parthia, he again fled to the Romans who then, as a consolation, granted him the co-rule of Osroene, a small Roman client state between Asia Minor and Roman Syria. The Syriac chronicle attributed to Dionysius of Telmahar claims that Parthamaspates ruled over Osroene from c. 118/119 to 123 AD. He ruled alongside Yalur of Osroene until becoming sole ruler in 123 AD.

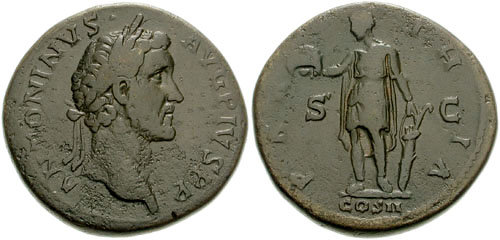
Sestertius of Antoninus Pius showing a subdued Parthia (PAR-TH-IA on the reverse) handing the crown to him, an empty claim that Parthia was still subject to Rome after the events surrounding Parthamaspates.

From Parthamaspates' territory of Osroene, he is known to have traded with the Kushan Empire, goods being sent by sea and through the Indus River.

Long after the failure of Parthamaspates, Rome still claimed to have control of Parthian land, as shown in a coin of Antoninus Pius (138–161 AD) with the image of a subdued "Parthia" offering the crown to him.

== Works cited ==
=== Books ===
- Curtis, Vesta; Pendleton, Elizabeth; Alram, Michael; Daryaee, Touraj, eds. (2016). The Parthian and Early Sasanian Empires: Adaptation and Expansion. Vol. 5. Oxbow Books. ISBN 9781785702075.

=== Journals ===
- Devine, A. (1979). "The "Parthi," the Tyranny of Tiberius, and the Date of Q. Curtius Rufus". Phoenix. 33 (2). Johns Hopkins University Press: 142–159. doi:10.32350/1087991. JSTOR 1087991.
- Mehrafarin, Reza; Hadji, Seyyed; Feyz, Soltan (2011). "A Study of the Ceramics of East Iran During the Later Parthian Era With Special Reference to Tapa Gowri". Central Asiatic Journal. 55 (2). Harrassowitz Verlag: 240–258. doi:10.32350/41928590. JSTOR 41928590.

== Sources ==
- (in French) Clément Huart & Louis Delaporte, L'Iran antique : Élam et Perse et la civilisation iranienne, Albin Michel, coll. « L'Évolution de l'Humanité », Paris, 1943, p. 327.
- Toumanoff, Cyril (1986). "Arsacids". Encyclopaedia Iranica, Vol. II, Fasc. 5. Cyril Toumanoff. pp. 525–546.

Parthamaspates of Parthia Arsacid dynasty
Preceded by Osroes I	King of the Parthian Empire; 116–117	Succeeded by Osroes I
Preceded by None (interregnum)	King of Osroene; 118–123 (with Yalur to 122)	Succeeded by Ma'nu VII
