= Sinatruces of Parthia =

King of the Parthian Empire, c. 75–69 BC

Sinatruces
- Great King
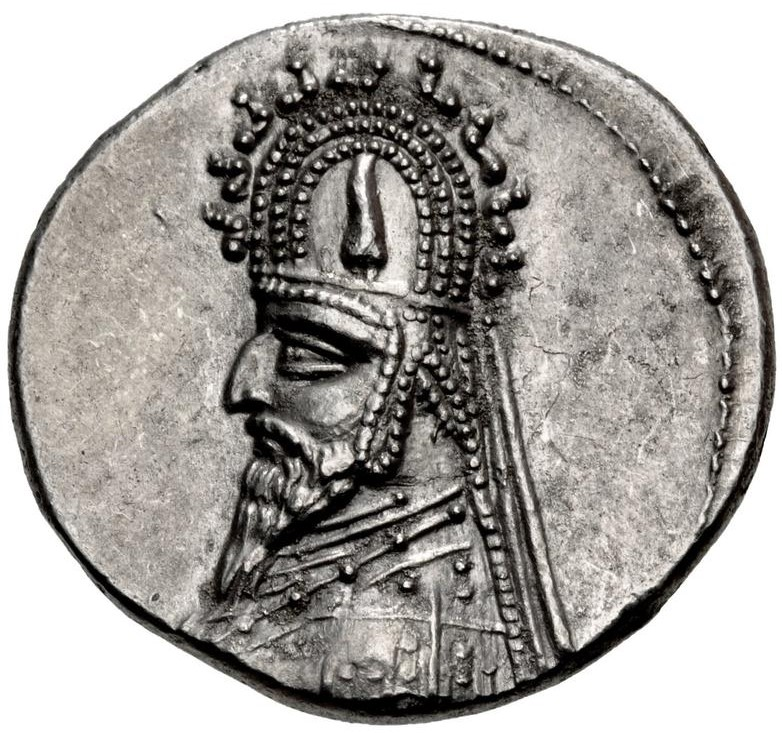
- Coin of Sinatruces, Ray mint

King of the Parthian Empire
- Reign: c. 75 – 69 BC
- Predecessor: Orodes I
- Successor: Phraates III
- Born: c. 158 BC
- Died: 69 BC (aged 90)
- Issue: Phraates III
- Dynasty: Arsacid dynasty
- Father: Mithridates I (?)
- Religion: Zoroastrianism

Sinatruces (also spelled Sinatrukes or Sanatruces) was king of the Parthian Empire from c. 75 BC to c. 69 BC. (Note: According to Assar (2006, pp. 52–53), Sinatruces reigned twice, from 93/2 to 88/7 BC, and then from 77/6 to 70/69 BC. However, this is not supported by other scholars, who state that Sinatruces only reigned once during the 70s BC.) Some sources (incl. G. R. Farhad Assar and Edward Dąbrowa) indicate that he could have been a son of the Parthian ruler Mithridates I (r. 171–132 BC), and a half-brother of Phraates II. David Sellwood, historian, designates Sinatruces as a probably younger brother of Mithridates I. Sinatruces was succeeded by his son Phraates III.

== Reign ==
The Parthian Empire had since the death of Mithridates II (r. 124–88 BC) fallen into a state of turmoil and decline; the authority of the crown had decreased, while the empire lost lands to its neighbours. Sinatruces, who originally resided amongst the Saka of Central Asia, took advantage of the chaotic situation in the empire, and with the aid of the Saka captured the Parthian throne in c. 75 BC, at the age of eighty. The name of the Arsacid branch established by Sinatruces on the Parthian throne has been coined by the modern historian Marek Jan Olbrycht as the "Sinatrucids", which ruled the Parthian Empire till 12 AD. The Sinatrucid family was notably supported by the Suren clan of Sakastan.

During Sinatruces' reign, the Artaxiad king of Armenia, Tigranes the Great (r. 95–55 BC), took advantage of the weakness of the Parthians, and retook the "seventy valleys" he had previously ceded to Mithridates II, and also went to conquer the Parthian domains of Media Atropatene, Gordyene, Adiabene, Osroene, and northern Mesopotamia. Sinatruces died in 69 BC and was succeeded by his son Phraates III. Contemporary historian, Saghi Gazerani, has come up with the hypothesis that the story of the legendary Iranian monarch, Zav Tahmasp, contains echoes of the life of Sinatruces.

== Coinage ==
On the obverse of his coins, Sinatruces is portrayed with a tiara decorated with a line of stags. The stags are a reference to the religious symbolism of the Saka, who had helped him ascend the throne. Sinatruces' son Phraates III also made use of stag symbols on his coins.

== Sources ==
- Assar, Gholamreza F. (2006). "A Revised Parthian Chronology of the Period 91-55 BC". Parthica. Incontri di Culture Nel Mondo Antico. 8: Papers Presented to David Sellwood. Istituti Editoriali e Poligrafici Internazionali. ISBN 978-8-881-47453-0. ISSN 1128-6342.
- Curtis, Vesta Sarkhosh (2007). "Religious iconography on ancient Iranian coins". Journal of Late Antiquity. London: 413–434.
- Curtis, Vesta Sarkhosh (2012). "Parthian coins: Kingship and Divine Glory". The Parthian Empire and its Religions. Computus Druck Satz & Verlag. pp. 67–83. ISBN 9783940598134.
- Dąbrowa, Edward (2007). "The Parthian Kingship". History of the Ancient Near East / Monographs. XI: 123–134.
- Dąbrowa, Edward (2010). "Arsakes Epiphanes. Were the Arsacids Deities 'Revealed'?". Studi Ellenistici. XXIV: 223–231.
- Dąbrowa, Edward (2012). "The Arsacid Empire". In Daryaee, Touraj (ed.). The Oxford Handbook of Iranian History. Oxford University Press. pp. 1–432. ISBN 978-0-19-987575-7.
- Dąbrowa, Edward (2013). "The Parthian Aristocracy: its Social Position and Political Activity". Parthica. 15: 53–62.
- Dąbrowa, Edward (2018). "Arsacid Dynastic Marriages". Electrum. 25: 73–83. doi:10.4467/20800909EL.18.005.8925.
- Garsoian, Nina (2005). "Tigran II". Encyclopaedia Iranica.
- Gazerani, Saghi (2015). The Sistani Cycle of Epics and Iran's National History: On the Margins of Historiography. BRILL. pp. 1–250. ISBN 9789004282964.
- Kia, Mehrdad (2016). The Persian Empire: A Historical Encyclopedia [2 volumes]. ABC-CLIO. ISBN 978-1610693912.
- Marciak, Michał (2017). Sophene, Gordyene, and Adiabene: Three Regna Minora of Northern Mesopotamia Between East and West. BRILL. ISBN 9789004350724.
- Olbrycht, Marek Jan (1997). "Parthian King's tiara - Numismatic evidence and some aspects of Arsacid political ideology". Notae Numismaticae. 2: 27–61.
- Olbrycht, Marek Jan (2015). "Arsacid Iran and the nomads of Central Asia – Ways of cultural transfer". Complexity of Interaction along the Eurasian Steppe Zone in the First Millenium CE. Bonn Contributions to Asian Archaeology. Vol. 7. Bonn: Vor- und Frühgeschichtliche Archäologie. pp. 333–390.
- Olbrycht, Marek Jan (2016). "Dynastic Connections in the Arsacid Empire and the Origins of the House of Sāsān". In Curtis, Vesta Sarkhosh; Pendleton, Elizabeth J.; Alram, Michael; Daryaee, Touraj (eds.). The Parthian and Early Sasanian Empires: Adaptation and Expansion. Oxbow Books. ISBN 9781785702082.
- Rezakhani, Khodadad (2013). "Arsacid, Elymaean, and Persid Coinage". In Potts, Daniel T. (ed.). The Oxford Handbook of Ancient Iran. Oxford University Press. ISBN 978-0199733309.
- Schmitt, Rüdiger (2005). "Personal Names, Iranian iv. Parthian Period". Encyclopaedia Iranica.
- Shayegan, M. Rahim (2011). Arsacids and Sasanians: Political Ideology in Post-Hellenistic and Late Antique Persia. Cambridge University Press. pp. 1–539. ISBN 9780521766418.
- Simonetta, Alberto M. (2001). "A Proposed Revision of the Attributions of the Parthian Coins Struck during the So-called 'Dark Age' and Its Historical Significance". East and West. 51 (1/2). Istituto Italiano per l'Africa e l'Oriente (IsIAO). ISSN 0012-8376.

Sinatruces of Parthia Arsacid dynasty Born: c. 158 BC Died: 69 BC
Preceded by Orodes I	King of the Parthian Empire c. 75–69 BC	Succeeded by Phraates III
