= Vologases VI =

King of Kings of Parthia from 208 to 228

- King of Kings
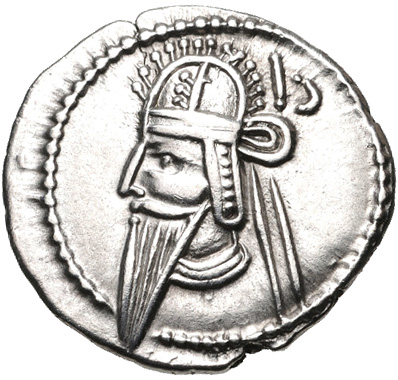
- Coin of Vologases VI, minted at Hamadan

King of the Parthian Empire
- Reign: 207/208 – 221/222
- Predecessor: Vologases V
- Successor: Ardashir I (Sasanian Empire)
- Rival king: Artabanus IV (213-224)
- Died: 228; Mesopotamia
- Father: Vologases V
- Religion: Zoroastrianism

Vologases VI (Parthian: Walagash, Persian: بلاش, Balāsh) was the uncontested king of the Parthian Empire from 208 to 213, but afterwards fell into a dynastic struggle with his brother Artabanus IV, (Note: Artabanus IV is erroneously known in older scholarship as Artabanus V. For further information, see Schippmann (1986a, pp. 647–650)) who by 216 was in control of most of the empire, even being acknowledged as the supreme ruler by the Roman Empire. Vologases VI continued to rule Seleucia until 221/2, and coin mints of him even appear in Mesopotamia until 228, when he was presumably defeated by the Sasanian Empire, who had previously defeated Artabanus IV and now succeeded the Parthians as the kings of Iran.

== Name ==
Vologases is the Greek and Latin form of the Parthian Walagash. The name is also attested in New Persian as Balāsh and Middle Persian Wardākhsh (also spelled Walākhsh). The etymology of the name is unclear. A suggestion has been made that the name could mean "strength".

== Biography ==
Vologases VI succeeded his father Vologases V as king in c. 208. His rule was unquestioned for a few years, till his brother Artabanus IV rebelled. The dynastic struggle between the two brothers most likely started in c. 213. Artabanus successfully conquered much of the empire, including Media and Susa. Vologases VI seems to have only managed to keep Seleucia, where he minted coins. The Roman emperor Caracalla sought to take advantage of the conflict between the two brothers. He tried to find a pretext to invade the Parthian Empire by requesting Vologases to send two refugees—a philosopher named Antiochus and a certain Tiridates, who was possibly either an Armenian prince or an uncle of Vologases. To the surprise of the Romans, Vologases had the two men sent to Caracalla in 215, thus denying him his pretext. Caracalla's choice of contacting Vologases instead of Artabanus shows that the Romans still saw him as the dominant king.

Caracalla thus chose to preoccupy himself with an invasion of Armenia. He appointed a freedman named Theocritus as the leader of the invasion, which eventually ended in a disaster. Caracalla then once again sought to start a war with the Parthians. In another attempt to gain a pretext, he requested Artabanus to marry his daughter, which he declined. It is disputed whether Caracalla's proposal was sincere or not. Caracalla's choice to contact Artabanus shows that the latter was now considered the dominant king over Vologases, who would rule a small principality centered around Seleucia until 221/2. A few years later (224), Ardashir I (r. 224–242), the founder of the Sasanian dynasty, defeated and killed Artabanus, thus putting an end to the Parthian Empire. Over the next few years, Ardashir I further expanded his new empire, and must have driven out or defeated Vologases in Mesopotamia soon after 228.

== Sources ==
- Chaumont, M. L.; Schippmann, K. (1988). "Balāš VI". Encyclopaedia Iranica, Vol. III, Fasc. 6. pp. 574–580.
- Schippmann, K. (1986a). "Artabanus (Arsacid kings)". Encyclopaedia Iranica, Vol. II, Fasc. 6. pp. 647–650.
- Schippmann, K. (1986b). "Arsacids ii. The Arsacid dynasty". Encyclopaedia Iranica, Vol. II, Fasc. 5. pp. 525–536.

Vologases VI Arsacid dynasty Died: 228
Regnal titles
Preceded by Vologases V	King of the Parthian Empire; 208–228	Succeeded by Parthian Empire abolished
