= Parthian coinage =

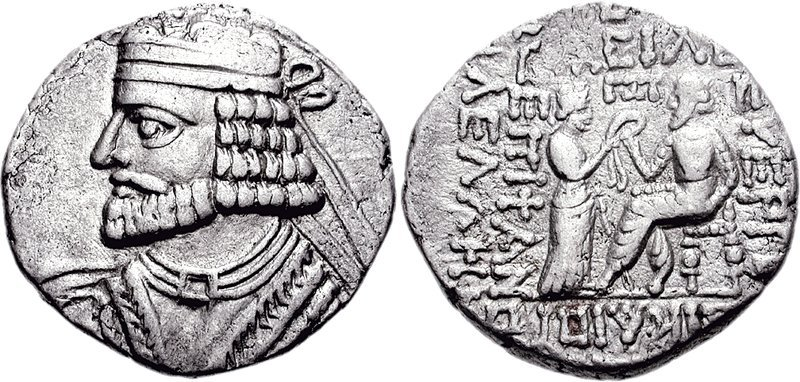
Tetradrachm of the Parthian king Vologases I, struck at Seleucia. On the obverse is a portrait of the king wearing a trouser-suit, diadem and beard. The reverse depicts an investiture scene, where the king is receiving a scepter by the Greek goddess Tyche. In the Parthian era, Iranians used Hellenistic iconography to portray their divine figures, thus the investiture scene can be associated with the Avestan khvarenah, i.e. kingly glory.

Parthian coinage was produced within the domains of the Parthian Empire (247 BC – 224 AD). The coins struck by the Parthians were mainly made of silver, with the main currencies being the drachm and tetradrachm. The tetradrachm, which generally weighed around 16 g, was only minted in Seleucia, first conquered by the Parthians in 141 BC. Design-wise, Parthian coinage was based on Seleucid and Achaemenid satrapal coinage.

== See also ==
- Royal formula of Parthian coinage
- Achaemenid coinage
- Sasanian coinage

== Sources ==
- Boyce, Mary (1984). Zoroastrians: Their Religious Beliefs and Practices. Psychology Press. pp. 1–252. ISBN 9780415239028.
- Boyce, Mary; Grenet, Frantz (1991). Beck, Roger (ed.). A History of Zoroastrianism, Zoroastrianism under Macedonian and Roman Rule. Leiden: Brill. ISBN 978-9004293915.
- Curtis, Vesta Sarkhosh; Stewart, Sarah, eds. (2007), The Age of the Parthians, Ideas of Iran, vol. 2, London: I. B. Tauris
- Curtis, Vesta Sarkhosh (2007), "The Iranian Revival in the Parthian Period", in Curtis, Vesta Sarkhosh and Sarah Stewart (ed.), The Age of the Parthians: The Ideas of Iran, vol. 2, London & New York: I.B. Tauris & Co Ltd., in association with the London Middle East Institute at SOAS and the British Museum, pp. 7–25, ISBN 978-1-84511-406-0
- Curtis, Vesta Sarkhosh (2012). "Parthian coins: Kingship and Divine Glory". The Parthian Empire and its Religions. pp. 67–83. ISBN 9783940598134.
- Curtis, Vesta Sarkhosh (2019). "From Mithradat I (c. 171-138 BCE) to Mithradat II (c. 122/1-91 BCE): the Formation of Arsacid Parthian Iconography". In Namadi, Yousef (ed.). Afarin Nameh: Essays on the Archaeology of Iran in Honour of Mehdi Rahbar. pp. 25–31.
- Olbrycht, Marek Jan (1997). "Parthian King's tiara - Numismatic evidence and some aspects of Arsacid political ideology". Notae Numismaticae. 2: 27–61.
- Olbrycht, Marek Jan (2016). "The Sacral Kingship of the early Arsacids I. Fire Cult and Kingly Glory". Anabasis: Studia Classica et Orientalia. 7: 91–106.
- Rezakhani, Khodadad (2013). "Arsacid, Elymaean, and Persid Coinage". In Potts, Daniel T. (ed.). The Oxford Handbook of Ancient Iran. Oxford University Press. ISBN 978-0199733309.
- Sellwood, David (1968). "Parthian Coins". In Fischer, William B. (ed.). The Cambridge History of Iran. Vol. 3a. Cambridge: Cambridge University Press. pp. 279–298. ISBN 0-521-06935-1.
- Sinisi, Fabrizio (2012). "The Coinage of the Parthians". In Metcalf, William E. (ed.). The Oxford Handbook of Greek and Roman Coinage. Oxford University Press. ISBN 978-0195305746.
