= Mithridates III of Parthia =

Mithridates III 𐭌𐭄𐭓𐭃𐭕
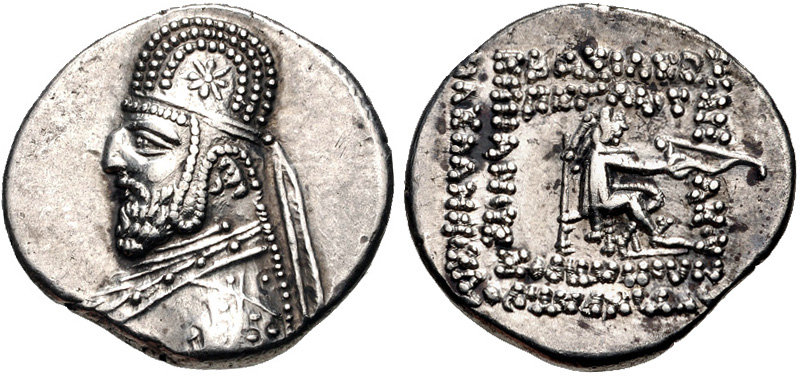
- Coin of a Parthian king, possibly Mithridates III, Ray mint

King of the Parthian Empire
- Reign: 87–80 BC
- Predecessor: Orodes I
- Successor: Orodes I
- Died: 80/79 BC
- Dynasty: Arsacid dynasty
- Father: Mithridates II
- Religion: Zoroastrianism

Mithridates III (Parthian: 𐭌𐭄𐭓𐭃𐭕 Mihrdāt) was king of the Parthian Empire from 87 to 80 BC. His existence is disputed in scholarship.

== Biography ==
Mithridates' year of birth is not specified by ancient historians, but his coin mints illustrate him as a middle-aged man. He was probably a son of Mithridates II. In July/August 87 BC, Mithridates III usurped the Parthian throne from Orodes I. Around the same period, the Seleucid ruler Demetrius III Eucaerus besieged his brother Philip I Philadelphus in Bereoa in Syria. The governor of the city, however, called on Aziz, an Arab phylarch (tribal leader), and the Parthian governor Mithridates Sinaces for help; with their aid, Demetrius III was defeated and taken hostage to Mithridates III, who treated him with "honour" until he died of illness. In August/September 80 BC, Mithridates III was dethroned in Babylon, and was shortly afterwards expelled from Susa by Orodes I. Mithridates III may have survived this event and managed to flee to the north, where he continued fighting until he died the following year. Other scholars, however, do not support the existence of a Mithridates III ruling in the 80s BC. According to M. Rahim Shayegan (2011), the existence of rival kings during Orodes I's reign "repose primarily upon numismatic evidence, may find scant support in the literary and documentary sources, and can be contradicted by a diverging interpretation of the period's coinage." Shayegan deduces that Gotarzes I reigned till his death in c. 80 BC, and was succeeded by Orodes I.

== Sources ==
- Assar, Gholamreza F. (2006). "A Revised Parthian Chronology of the Period 91-55 BC". Parthica. Incontri di Culture Nel Mondo Antico. 8: Papers Presented to David Sellwood. Istituti Editoriali e Poligrafici Internazionali. ISBN 978-8-881-47453-0. ISSN 1128-6342.
- Curtis, Vesta Sarkhosh (2012). "Parthian coins: Kingship and Divine Glory". The Parthian Empire and its Religions. Computus Druck Satz & Verlag. pp. 67–83. ISBN 9783940598134.
- Olbrycht, Marek Jan (2015). "Arsacid Iran and the nomads of Central Asia – Ways of cultural transfer". Complexity of Interaction along the Eurasian Steppe Zone in the First Millenium CE. Bonn Contributions to Asian Archaeology. Vol. 7. Bonn. pp. 333–390.
- Olbrycht, Marek Jan (2016). "Dynastic Connections in the Arsacid Empire and the Origins of the House of Sāsān". In Curtis, Vesta Sarkhosh; Pendleton, Elizabeth J.; Alram, Michael; Daryaee, Touraj (eds.). The Parthian and Early Sasanian Empires: Adaptation and Expansion. Oxbow Books. ISBN 9781785702082.
- Sellwood, David (1976). "The Drachms of the Parthian "Dark Age"". The Journal of the Royal Asiatic Society of Great Britain and Ireland. 1 (1). Cambridge University Press: 2–25. doi:10.1017/S0035869X00132988. JSTOR 25203669. S2CID 161619682. (registration required)
- Shayegan, M. Rahim (2011). Arsacids and Sasanians: Political Ideology in Post-Hellenistic and Late Antique Persia. Cambridge University Press. pp. 1–539. ISBN 9780521766418.

Mithridates III of Parthia Arsacid dynasty Died: 80 BC
Preceded by Orodes I	King of the Parthian Empire; 87–80 BC	Succeeded by Orodes I
