= Life of Caesar (Plutarch) =

2nd-century CE biography – part of Parallel Lives

The Life of Caesar (original Greek title: Καίσαρ; translated into Latin as Vita Iulii Caesaris) is a biography of Julius Caesar written in Ancient Greek in the beginning of the 2nd century AD by the Greek moralist Plutarch, as part of his Parallel Lives. In this book comparing Greek and Roman statesmen, Plutarch paired Caesar with Alexander the Great, the other grand victor of classical antiquity. Unlike most of the other Parallel Lives, Caesar's Life is more historical and secular, lacking the main features of Plutarch's works: moral judgement and relationship with the divine. Plutarch moved these elements of Caesar's personality to the lives of the other Roman contemporaries he wrote about, such as Pompey, Cicero, or Brutus.

Most of Plutarch's source was the lost Histories of Asinius Pollio, a contemporary of Caesar, who was critical of him. In turn, Plutarch's Life was the main historical source of Shakespeare for his play Julius Caesar, first staged in 1599.

== Work ==
=== Date of writing ===
At the end of the reign of Domitian (AD 81–96), Plutarch wrote a series of biographies of the first eight Roman emperors, entitled in modern editions the Lives of the Caesars, of which only Galba and Otho have survived. Plutarch then began another series of biographies, called the Parallel Lives, which he started at the beginning of Trajan's reign in AD 98 and was still working on it at the time of his death in the early AD 120s. These biographies compared the lives of famous Greek and Roman statesmen in pairs, of which 46 lives have survived. Paired with that of Alexander the Great, the Life of Caesar was composed midway through, slightly after AD 110, as part of a batch of six pairs that included other Romans of the late Republic: Agesilaus–Pompey, Nicias–Crassus, Alexander–Caesar, Phocion–Cato the Younger, Dion–Brutus, Demetrius–Antony.

=== Pairing with Alexander ===
Initially, Plutarch must have thought about pairing Alexander with Pompey, who was much more often compared to Alexander than Caesar during their lifetime. For example, Pompey received the cognomen Magnus ("the Great") in reference to Alexander. Plutarch even makes a comparison between Pompey and Alexander in the Life of Pompey. However, Plutarch finally chose to pair Pompey with the Spartan king Agesilaus II, who likewise met his downfall and an inglorious death in Egypt. According to Christopher Pelling, Alexander and Caesar were "the two great victors of Greek and Roman history" and the more natural pair. The comparison between Alexander and Caesar had already been done before Plutarch, notably by Velleius Paterculus, who wrote under the emperor Tiberius (AD 14–37). Like Alexander, Caesar wanted to launch a grand campaign that would have circled the known world (notably against the Parthians), but he died just before. Alexander and Caesar both stirred resentment from the establishment by their new style of exercising power; Alexander by adopting Persian customs, Caesar by appearing like a king. The main difference between Caesar and Alexander is that the latter became paranoid and harsh at the end of his life, whereas Caesar was merciful towards his enemies.

Alexander–Caesar is one of the four pairs of the Parallel Lives for which the conclusion is lost. In this small text Plutarch usually compares the two characters he has paired, and tells who was the better of the two (most of them are draws, or close wins). However, following a theory first made by Hartmut Erbse, several scholars have suggested that Plutarch did not make a conclusion for these four pairs. Plutarch possibly considered their final chapters to be sufficient; that of the Life of Caesar is particularly powerful on its own. Supporting this view, Christopher Pelling suggests that the Greek historian Appian ended his book on Caesar's Civil War with a comparison between Alexander and Caesar, precisely because he had noted that such an account was missing in the Parallel Lives.

=== Sources ===
Plutarch read widely, and often combined several sources for his Lives, although he mostly followed one source at a time for a particular event or topic.

Plutarch cites seven authors in the Life of Caesar:

- Asinius Pollio was a writer of the first century BC. A soldier who served under Caesar then Octavian, he turned to literature at the end of his life, perhaps because of his disbelief in public affairs. He indeed retained an unusual critical tone towards Augustus. His work started in 60 BC and can be identified thanks to the resemblance between Plutarch and Appian, who also used Polio extensively for his account of the Civil War.
- Caesar's Commentaries on the Gallic Wars. Plutarch perhaps knew this work through the citations he found in Asinius Polio's own Histories. Likewise, the reference to Caesar's Anticato (a lost work written against Cato) probably comes from the reading of Munatius Rufus or Thrasea Paetus.
- Livy's Ab urbe condita libri and Strabo's Geographica are often cited as complements to Plutarch's main narrative, especially for their frequent mentions of omens. Plutarch cited them for this reason in some other Lives.
- Cicero's On his own consulship. Plutarch remained influenced by the reading of the works of Cicero for his own Life, which he had composed earlier. He therefore made citations of Cicero from his memory, and several passages hostile to Mark Antony likely derive from Cicero's enmity of him.
- Gaius Oppius, a lost historian who was a friend of Caesar. He was used by other historians and biographers that dealt with Caesar, such as Suetonius and Velleius Paterculus. Plutarch was aware of Oppius' biaised tone in favour of Caesar.
- Tanusius Geminus, a lost author. It is likely that Plutarch did not have a first-hand account of him, but got knowledge of him through Asinius Polio.

Moreover, Plutarch read a lot of authors for the writing of the other Lives, and might have used their contents for Caesar's Life, even though he does not cite them. Christopher Pelling suggests writers such as Theophanes, Munatius Rufus (through Thrasea Paetus), Empylus and Calpurnius Bibulus (who both wrote a book on Brutus), Publius Volumnius, and Messalla Corvinus. Plutarch also reads his own works as a source for his Life of Caesar. For instance, the passage about Caesar's reform of the calendar likely came from his earlier work on the king of Rome Numa, known as the inventor of the Roman calendar. However, Pelling notes that Plutarch's Roman Lives lack the references to other kinds of literature: theatre, poetry, philosophy, and also pamphlets. Plutarch mention these genres in his Greek Lives, but his knowledge of Latin, which he acquired late in his life, prevented him from doing the same for their Roman counterparts. In his Life of Caesar, Suetonius extensively gather this non-historical literature.

=== Moral judgement ===
Plutarch's Parallel Lives are principally a moral judgement of historical characters, but his Life of Caesar is curiously devoid of it. He does not comment on Caesar going into debt in his youth, even though he wrote a small work entitled Avoid Debt. In contrast, in the Life of Pompey, Plutarch makes harsh criticisms of Pompey's demagoguery, whereas the same judgement is tamer for Caesar. The moral question about whether Caesar's assassination was justified is also not treated in the Life of Caesar, but in that of Brutus, where he also discusses Caesar's autocratic rule. Caesar's dubious role in the Catilinarian Conspiracy is better dealt with in the Life of Cicero. Even Caesar's positive qualities are likewise avoided; his famous clemency towards his enemies is only briefly mentioned. In addition, Plutarch conceals stories about his mistresses; his affair with Servilia is moved to the lives of Cato and Brutus, while that with Cleopatra is much less developed than in the Life of Antony. Other ancient writers were less coy about judging him: Suetonius remarked that he was "justly killed", Sallust disapproved his populism, or Pliny condemned the bloodshed of the Gallic Wars. Moreover, Plutarch does not expand on Caesar's divine honours and relationship with the gods. By contrast, the Life of Alexander counts several cases of divine involvement, starting with the omens and portents that surrounded Alexander's birth. The gods only intervene in Caesar's Life after his death, under the form of his "great guardian spirit" that tracked and killed his assassins.

The Life of Caesar is therefore a more historical biography, focused on big events and light on anecdotes and moral judgements, than the rest of the Parallel Lives. In this regard, it is comparable with the Life of Themistocles.

Using typically Greek stereotypes, Plutarch analysed Roman politics at the time of Caesar as an opposition between the people (demos) and the oligarchs (oligoi). Caesar is presented as having used the former to get in power against the latter, who are nevertheless successful in the end. Whereas Suetonius debates whether Caesar had always coveted tyranny, Plutarch does not discuss the question and considers that Caesar's mind was set on achieving sole rule from the beginning of his life. In the 3rd chapter, Plutarch writes that "his attention was devoted to becoming first in power and in armed strength". It is nevertheless a goal that he ascribes to most of the other Roman statesmen he wrote about on this period (Pompey, Catiline, Cicero, Antony...). Plutarch used these political stereotypes because they could draw better parallels between Greeks and Romans, while he discarded the Roman aspects of Caesar's rise to power: connections with the nobility and equites, the use of his clientela or gladiators. Following a pattern first established by Plato in the Republic, Caesar is pictured as a demagogue using popular support to get in power. However, Plutarch shows how Caesar did not match Plato's path to a brutal tyranny. Instead, Caesar became famous for his clemency towards his enemies (including Brutus and Cassius), honoured Pompey after he died, and refused a bodyguard in order to remain accessible to the people. These good qualities are precisely what made his assassination possible, and the main moral point of his Life.

== In Shakespeare ==
In 1559, Plutarch's Parallel Lives were translated into French by Jacques Amyot, whose work was in turn translated into English by Sir Thomas North. William Shakespeare only read Plutarch from North's version, and he was his only source for his plays Julius Caesar (1599), Coriolanus (1605–1608), and Antony and Cleopatra (1607).

Several passages of the play are directly transposed from Plutarch's Life, such as the assassination. Shakespeare also used most of the Life of Brutus and some of that of Antony. On some points, Shakespeare adapted the elements he found in Plutarch to suit his storytelling. From the anecdote told by Plutarch that Caesar pretended he did not stand up when meeting with senators because he had an epilepsy crisis, Shakespeare portrayed Caesar as a physically weak character. On the other hand, Shakespeare dismissed elements that were central in Plutarch, like the ingratitude of Brutus towards Caesar, who had spared him and made him praetor.

The play had some echoes in English contemporary politics, as in 1597 the Earl of Essex was already causing trouble (he led a revolt in 1601) and republicanism was debated in political circles.

== Bibliography ==
=== Ancient sources ===
- Plato, The Republic.
- Plutarch, Parallel Lives.
- Suetonius, The Twelve Caesars.

=== Modern sources ===
- Hartmut Erbse, "Die Bedeutung der Synkrisis in den Parallelbiographien Plutarchs", Hermes, 84. Bd., H. 4 (1956), pp. 398–424.
- Christopher Pelling, Plutarch Caesar: Translated with Introduction and Commentary, Clarendon Ancient History Series, Oxford; New York: Oxford University Press, 2011. ISBN 9780199608355
