= Vonones I =

King of the Parthian Empire (8–12 AD) and Armenia (12–18 AD)

- King of Kings
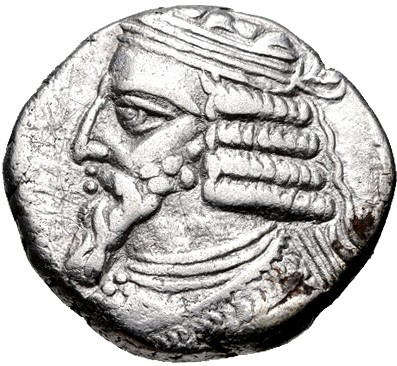
- Tetradrachm of Vonones I, Seleucia mint

King of the Parthian Empire
- Reign: 8–12
- Predecessor: Orodes III
- Successor: Artabanus II

King of Armenia
- Reign: 12–18
- Predecessor: Tigranes V and Erato
- Successor: Artaxias III
- Died: 19; Cilicia (modern-day Turkey)
- Issue: Meherdates
- Dynasty: Arsacid dynasty
- Father: Phraates IV
- Mother: Scythian princess (?)
- Religion: Zoroastrianism

Vonones I (ΟΝΩΝΗΣ Onōnēs on his coins) was an Arsacid prince, who ruled as King of Kings of the Parthian Empire from 8 to 12, and subsequently as King of Armenia from 12 to 18. He was the eldest son of Phraates IV (r. 37–2 BC) and was sent to Rome as a hostage in 10/9 BC to avoid conflict over the succession of Phraates IV's youngest son, Phraataces.

== Background and early life ==
Vonones was the eldest son of Phraates IV. According to the classical Roman historian Tacitus, Vonones was related to the Scythian king. Phraates IV had previously been aided during his reign by the Scythians to retake his throne from the usurper Tiridates in c. 30 BC, and thus Vonones was possibly the result of a marriage alliance between Phraates IV and a Scythian tribal chief, who agreed to provide support in exchange for the union. Vonones was along with three of his brothers (Phraates, Seraspandes and Rhodaspes) sent to Rome in 10/9 BC, in order to prevent conflict over the succession of Phraates IV's youngest son, Phraataces. The Roman emperor Augustus used this diplomatic gesture as propaganda, portraying it as a sign of Parthia’s submission to Rome, listing it as a great accomplishment in his Res Gestae Divi Augusti.

== Reign ==
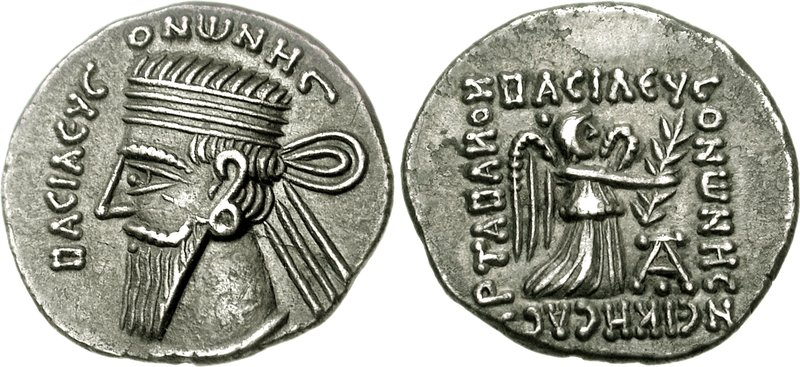
Drachm, Ekbatana mint

After the assassination of Orodes III in about 6 AD, the Parthians applied to Augustus for a new king from the house of Arsaces. Augustus sent them Vonones I, but he was unable to maintain his rule; he had been educated as a Roman, and was despised by those who regarded him as a Roman puppet. Another member of the Arsacid house, Artabanus II, who ruled Media Atropatene, was invited to the throne. In a civil war he defeated and expelled Vonones I.

Vonones I fled into Armenia and became king there in 12. Artabanus II, now the monarch of the Parthian Empire, attempted to depose Vonones I from the Armenian throne and appoint his own son instead. This was opposed by the Romans, who regarded this as posing a danger to their interests. As a result, the Roman emperor Tiberius (r. 14–37) sent his stepson Germanicus to prevent this from happening. However, the Roman general was met with no resistance by the Parthians, and reached an agreement with Artabanus II to appoint Artaxias III the new King of Armenia and renounce their support of Vonones I. The Romans thus acknowledged Artabanus II as the legitimate Parthian ruler. In order to ratify the friendly relationship between the two empires, Artabanus and Germanicus met on an island in the Euphrates in 18. The Romans moved Vonones I into Syria, where he was kept in custody, though in a kingly style. Later he was moved to Cilicia, and when he tried to escape in about 19, he was killed by his guards.

His death and the now unchallenged dominance of Artabanus II split the Parthian nobility, since not all of them supported a new branch of the Arsacid family taking over the empire. The Parthian satrap of Sakastan, Drangiana and Arachosia, named Gondophares, declared independence from Artabanus II and founded the Indo-Parthian Kingdom. He assumed the titles of "Great King of Kings" and "Autokrator", signaling his assertion of sovereignty. Nevertheless, Artabanus and Gondophares most likely reached an agreement that the Indo-Parthians would not intervene in the affairs of the Arsacids. Vonones was survived by his son Meherdates, who attempted to take the Parthian throne in 49–51.

== Bibliography ==
=== Ancient works ===
- Hon. Ana. 5, 9.
- Josephus, Antiquities of the Jews, xviii, 2, 4.
- Tacitus, Annals, ii, 4, 58, 68.

=== Modern works ===
- Bivar, A.D.H. (1983). "The Political History of Iran Under the Arsacids". In Yarshater, Ehsan (ed.). The Cambridge History of Iran: The Seleucid, Parthian and Sasanian Periods. Vol. 3(1). Cambridge: Cambridge University Press. pp. 21–99. ISBN 0-521-20092-X.
- Bigwood, J. M. (2004). "Queen Mousa, Mother and Wife(?) of King Phraatakes of Parthia: A Re-evaluation of the Evidence". Journal of the Classical Association of Canada. 4 (1). Project Muse: 35–70. doi:10.1353/mou.2004.0027. S2CID 164436127.
- Bigwood, Joan M. (2008). "Some Parthian Queens in Greek and Babylonian Documents". Iranica Antiqua. 43: 235–274. doi:10.2143/IA.43.0.2024050.
- Brosius, Maria (2006), The Persians: An Introduction, London & New York: Routledge, ISBN 978-0-415-32089-4
- Dąbrowa, Edward (2012). "The Arsacid Empire". In Daryaee, Touraj (ed.). The Oxford Handbook of Iranian History. Oxford University Press. pp. 1–432. ISBN 978-0-19-987575-7.
- Kia, Mehrdad (2016). The Persian Empire: A Historical Encyclopedia [2 volumes]. ABC-CLIO. ISBN 978-1610693912.
- Olbrycht, Marek Jan (2012). "The Political-Military Strategy of Artabanos/Ardawān II in AD 34–371". Anabasis: Studia Classica et Orientalia. 3: 215–237.
- Olbrycht, Marek Jan (2016). "Dynastic Connections in the Arsacid Empire and the Origins of the House of Sāsān". In Curtis, Vesta Sarkhosh; Pendleton, Elizabeth J.; Alram, Michael; Daryaee, Touraj (eds.). The Parthian and Early Sasanian Empires: Adaptation and Expansion. Oxbow Books. ISBN 9781785702082.
- Schippmann, K. (1986). "Arsacids ii. The Arsacid dynasty". Encyclopaedia Iranica, Vol. II, Fasc. 5. pp. 525–536.
- Strugnell, Emma (2008). "Thea Musa, Roman Queen of Parthia". Iranica Antiqua. 43: 275–298. doi:10.2143/IA.43.0.2024051.

Vonones I Arsacid dynasty Died: 19
Preceded by Orodes III	King of the Parthian Empire; 8–12	Succeeded by Artabanus II
Preceded by Tigranes V and Erato	King of Armenia; 12–18	Succeeded by Artaxias III
