= Antony's Atropatene campaign =

Military campaign in the Roman Republic

- Part of the Roman–Parthian Wars
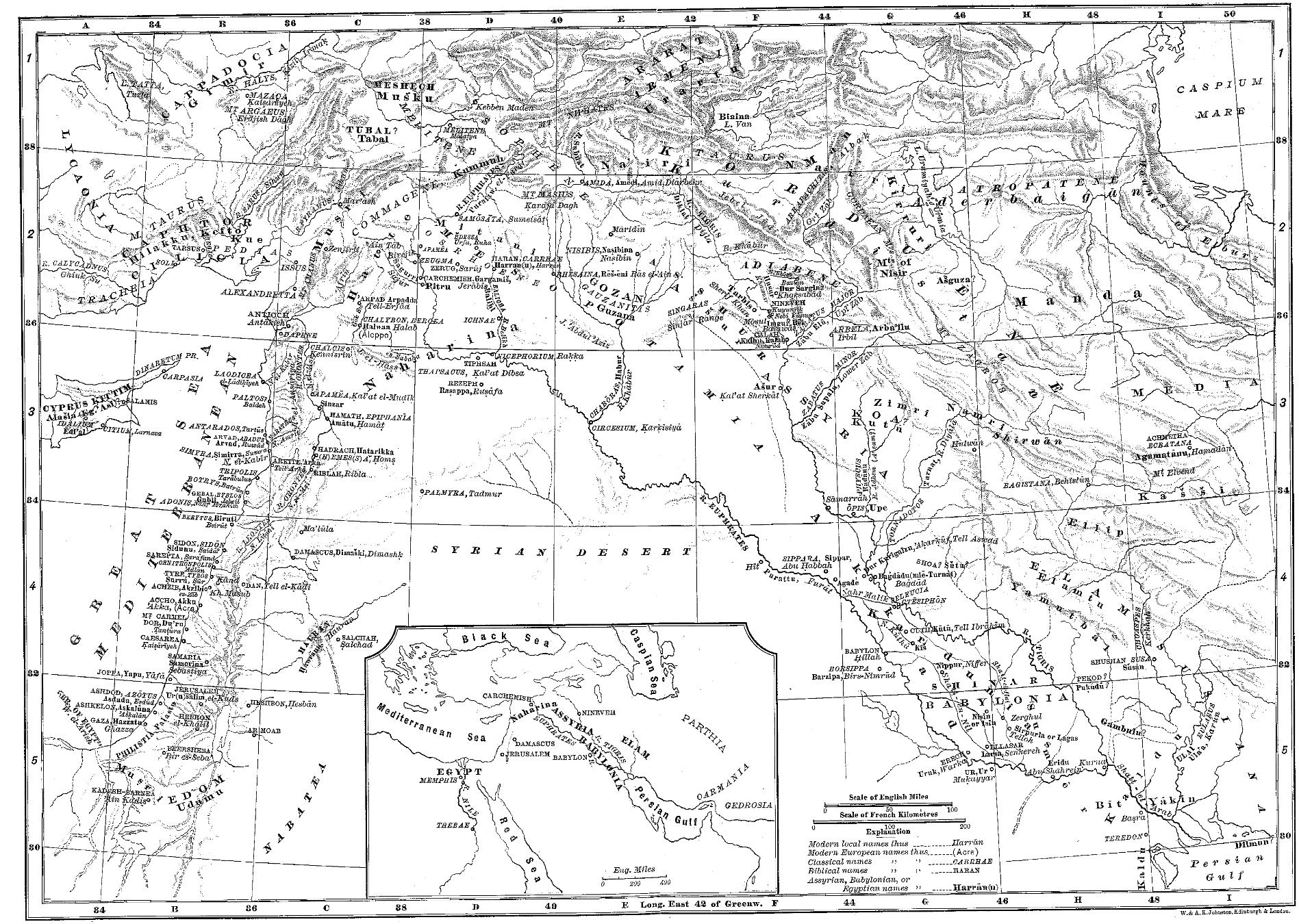
Date	36 BC
Location	Atropatene
Result	Parthian victory
Territorial changes	Status quo ante bellum

Belligerents
Roman Republic; Armenia; Galatia; Cappadocia; Pontus; Herodian Judea	Parthian Empire; Atropatene; Hasmonean Judea

Commanders and leaders
Mark Antony; Artavasdes II of Armenia; Oppius Statianus †; Polemon I of Pontus (POW) (surrendered); Herod the Great	Phraates IV; Artavasdes I of Atropatene; Monaeses

Strength
100,000 in total: 16 legions (80,000 legionaries) with 300 wagons of siege engines; 10,000 Iberian and Celtic cavalry; 6,000 Armenian armored cavalry, 7,000 Armenian infantry; 23,000–24,000 auxiliaries	24,000 in total: 2,000 cataphracts; 22,000 horse archers

Casualties and losses
~32,000 men lost	Unknown, but minimal

Antony's Atropatene campaign, also known as Antony's Parthian campaign, was a military campaign by Mark Antony, the eastern triumvir of the Roman Republic, against the Parthian Empire under Phraates IV.

Julius Caesar had planned an invasion of Parthia but died before he could implement it. In 40 BC, the Parthians were joined by Pompeian forces and briefly captured much of the Roman East, but a force sent by Antony defeated them and reversed their gains.

Allying with several kingdoms, including Armenia, Antony began a campaign against Parthia with a massive force in 36 BC. Since the Euphrates front was found to be strong, Antony chose the route via Armenia. Upon entering Atropatene, the Roman baggage train and siege engines, which had taken a different route, were destroyed by a Parthian cavalry force. Antony moved on and besieged the Atropatene capital but was unsuccessful. The arduous journey of retreat to Armenia and then Syria further inflicted losses on his force, making the war a tactical Roman disaster and a strategic failure. Peace was later negotiated by Augustus.

== Source analysis ==
Primary sources for the 36 Atropatene campaign of Antony include sections, fragments or passing mentions in Strabo (Geographica), Livy (Periochae), Velleius Paterculus, Josephus (The Jewish War), Frontinus (Strategemata), Plutarch (Life of Antony), Arrian (fragments of Parthica), Florus/Justus (Epitome of Roman History), Cassius Dio (Roman History), Festus (Breviarium), Eutropius (Breviarium Historiae Romanae), Orosius, and the anonymous De viris illustribus.

Benjamin Kelly (2008) noted that apart from agreeing on a few basic facts, the primary sources on Antony's 36 Atropatene campaign contradict each other on virtually everything. Discrepancies range from troop strength and losses; to which city was targeted by Antony's siege; to whether almost all Roman soldiers except Polemon I of Pontus in Statianus' supply forces were killed, or that many more were captured; to whether Antony's retreating infantry used the testudo formation tactic once or multiple times to ward off the Parthians; and whether the Armenian king was held responsible for the campaign's failure or not. Florus claims that at some point Antony walked into a Parthian trap and lost two legions, which no other source mentions, although one would expect Dio or Plutarch to do so. Florus alleged that the blazing heat of Armenia and the snowfall of Cappadocia inflicted lethal attrition on the retreating Romans, while Plutarch and Dio wrote that the snow and ice of Armenia were killing Antony's soldiers. Dio and especially Orosius asserted that many Romans deserted the army during the withdrawal, while Plutarch emphasised that the troops remained loyal to Antony. Plutarch indicates explicitly and implicitly that he based his account on multiple, sometimes conflicting sources, leading to duplications of the same events (such as the Romans twice fraternising with Parthians, being misled along a "safe" passage but attacked by Parthians anyway), and contradicting himself on whether the Armenian king's withdrawal of the cavalry, or Antony's decision to campaign during the winter season, was to blame for the expedition's failure.

== Background ==
Julius Caesar, after ensuring victory in his civil war, planned a campaign into the Parthian Empire in 44 BC to avenge the earlier defeat of a Roman army led by Marcus Licinius Crassus at the Battle of Carrhae. Caesar's plan was, after a brief pacification of Dacia, to continue east into Parthian territory. After his assassination, the Second Triumvirate was formed with Marcus Antonius (Antony), Marcus Lepidus and Gaius Octavianus (later known as Augustus). Soon, with the triumvirs preoccupied with the revolt of Sextus Pompey in Sicily, Parthia attacked Roman-controlled Syria and the client kingdom of Judea.

The Judean high priest and puppet Roman ruler, Hyrcanus II, was overthrown and sent as prisoner to Seleucia, and the pro-Parthian Hasmonean Antigonus was installed in his place. Antigonus was the only remaining son of the former King Aristobulus II, whom the Romans deposed and installed the weaker Hyrcanus II as high priest (but not king) in 63 BC. Upon capturing Hyrcanus II, Antigonus bit off his uncle's ears to disqualify him from ever serving as high priest again.

In Anatolia, the Parthians allied with Quintus Labienus, son of Caesar's former general and later antagonist Titus Labienus, and penetrated deep into the west and defeated a Roman army under Decidius Saxa. They were, however, defeated by a veteran army, led by Publius Ventidius Bassus, which drove the invaders from Roman territory.

With the aid of Mark Antony, a lover of Egyptian Ptolemaic Queen Cleopatra VII, the son-in-law of Hyrcanus, Herod, returned to Judea and recaptured Jerusalem in 37 BC.

== Campaign ==
In 36 BC, Antony went on to attack the Parthian Empire. Having 16 legions (about 80,000 men), he joined with forces from the client kingdoms of Galatia, Cappadocia, Pontus and Armenia (7,000 infantry and 6,000 heavy cavalry). The invasion force reached a total of 90,000 to 100,000 men with siege engines in 300 wagons (a train ~5 miles (8.0 km) long) and an 80 foot (24 m) long battering ram. Cleopatra accompanied Antony as far as the city of Zeugma, where he drew together the army.

Late into the campaigning season of 36, Antony attacked Media Atropatene via Armenia.

As the Parthians were concentrated on the Euphrates, Antony chose the route via Armenia towards Atropatene. From there, Antony and the bulk of the force took the convenient caravan route. The baggage train, which was protected by two legions under legatus Oppius Statianus and accompanied by King Artavasdes II of Armenia, took a different longer route. After entering Atropatene, the latter convoy was attacked by a Parthian cavalry force under Monaeses (according to Kelly (2008), King Phraates himself commanded the attack on the Roman baggage train). Statianus and 10,000 legionaries were killed and Antony's supplies and siege engines were destroyed. King Polemon I of Pontus was captured, but King Artavasdes II and his cavalry had hastily retreated and did not engage.

The retreat of the Armenian king was later interpreted as treason in Antony's camp. However, a pro-Antony bias is present in the narrations of the campaign by Strabo and Plutarch, whose primary source was a written report by Antony's friend, Quintus Dellius, who had masked Antony's poor management and put the blame on the Armenian king.

Antony still proceeded to besiege the fortified Atropatenian capital Phraata/Praaspa (identified as either Maragheh or less probably Ganzak/Takht-e Soleyman). Ceaselessly harassed by the Parthian and Atropatenian cavalry, Antony finally abandoned the siege and realised his defeat.

Antony then began an exhausting retreat to Armenia along a mountainous road and was continually harassed by the Parthian cavalry. His forces reached the border of Armenia Major after 27 days. A survey of the troops suggested 24,000 men were lost.

In Armenia, Antony hid his resentment of the Armenian king and his intentions to punish him in the future, as he needed support to continue his journey through Armenia back to Roman soil in Syria. Although safe from Parthian attacks after arriving in Armenia, additional Roman soldiers died on the march to the Mediterranean due to inclement weather. The arduous journey through the mountains of Armenia in winter greatly reduced the strength of Antony's army. Around 32,000 men of his army were lost in total.

== Aftermath ==
Some Roman sources blame the Armenian king for the heavy defeat, but others do not; Strabo and Plutach disagree sharply on the issue. Plutach even contradicts himself on whether the Armenian king's withdrawal of the cavalry, or Antony's decision to campaign during the winter season, was to blame for the expedition's failure. Modern sources note Antony's poor management and planning.

Again with Egyptian money, citing abandonment of the Romans in 36 after initially supporting them, Antony invaded Armenia in 34, capturing king Artavasdes and taking control of Armenia for a time. On his return to Egypt, the equivalent of a Roman triumph was celebrated in the streets of Alexandria. At the end of the celebration, the whole city was summoned to hear a very important political statement, later known as the Donations of Alexandria, which effectively ended Antony's alliance with Octavian.

Parthian King Phraates IV was unable to follow up the victory because of a civil war from 32 BC to 25 BC. It began by a rebellion of Tiridates that was probably supported by aristocratic circles and the Romans.

Among the prized possessions taken by Antony from Media Atropatene were the first Nisean horses in Rome. When Antony died, these horses fell into the hands of Augustus.

== See also ==
- Fabian strategy

== Bibliography ==
- Kelly, Benjamin (2008). Dellius, the Parthian Campaign, and the Image of Mark Antony (PDF). Toronto: York University, Toronto. pp. 213–234.
