= Phraates (son of Phraates IV) =

Parthian prince

Phraates (Parthian: 𐭐𐭓𐭇𐭕 Frahāt) was a Parthian prince, who was one of the eldest sons of Phraates IV (r. 37–2 BC).

In 10/9 BC, seeking to secure the throne for her son Phraataces, Musa convinced Phraates IV to send his four first-born sons (Vonones, Phraates, Seraspandes and Rhodaspes) to Rome in order to prevent conflict over his succession. The Roman emperor Augustus used this as propaganda depicting the submission of Parthia to Rome, listing it as a great accomplishment in his Res Gestae Divi Augusti. During his stay in Rome, Phraates was the patron of a temple at Nemi, possibly devoted to Isis. In 35 AD, Phraates attempted to take the Parthian throne from Artabanus II, but died from illness shortly after reaching the Parthian realm.

== Sources ==
- Bivar, A.D.H. (1968). "The Political History of Iran Under the Arsacids". In Fischer, William B. (ed.). The Cambridge History of Iran. Vol. 3a. Cambridge: Cambridge University Press. pp. 21–99. ISBN 0-521-06935-1.
- Brosius, Maria (2006), The Persians: An Introduction, London & New York: Routledge, ISBN 978-0-415-32089-4
- Dąbrowa, Edward (2012). "The Arsacid Empire". In Daryaee, Touraj (ed.). The Oxford Handbook of Iranian History. Oxford University Press. pp. 1–432. ISBN 978-0-19-987575-7. Archived from the original on 2019-01-01.
- Dąbrowa, Edward (2017). "Tacitus on the Parthians": 171–189.
- Kia, Mehrdad (2016). The Persian Empire: A Historical Encyclopedia [2 volumes]. ABC-CLIO. ISBN 978-1610693912.
- Schippmann, K. (1986). "Arsacids ii. The Arsacid dynasty". Encyclopaedia Iranica, Vol. II, Fasc. 5. pp. 525–536.
- Strugnell, Emma (2008). "Thea Musa, Roman Queen of Parthia". Iranica Antiqua. 43: 275–298. doi:10.2143/IA.43.0.2024051.
