= Tanusia gens =

Ancient Roman family

The gens Tanusia was an obscure plebeian family at ancient Rome. Few members of this gens are mentioned in history, and none attained any of the higher offices of the Roman state. Quintus Cicero mentions that the heads of this family were proscribed by Sulla, and Tanusius Geminus was a historian of the same period, whose work has now been lost. A few other Tanusii are known from epigraphy.

== Praenomina ==
The Tanusii used the praenomina Lucius, Gaius, Marcus, Quintus, and Titus, all of which were amongst the most common names at all periods of Roman history.

== Members ==
This list includes abbreviated praenomina. For an explanation of this practice, see filiation.

- Tanusius Geminus, a historian whose work has been lost, with the exception of a passage quoted by Suetonius, concerning Sulla. He is probably the same as the historian "Ganusius" referred to by Plutarch, and the annalist "Tamusius" mentioned by Seneca.
- Lucius Tanusius L. f., a native of Ateste in Venetia and Histria, was a veteran of the Legio XIV Gemina, buried at Mogontiacum in Germania Superior, aged fifty, along with Quintus Tanusius, probably his brother, in a tomb dating from the first half of the first century.
- Quintus Tanusius L. f., a native of Ateste, and a veteran of the Legio XIV Gemina, was buried at Mogontiacum, aged forty, along with Lucius Tanusius, probably his brother, in a tomb dating to the first half of the first century.
- Tanusius, the author of an inscription from Pompeii in Campania.
- Gaius Tanusius T. f. Balbinus, interred at Saena in Etruria, in a cinerarium dating to the latter half of the first century.
- Lucius Tanusius Dexter, one of the aediles at Sora in Latium in AD 83.
- Lucius Tanusius M. f. Pudens, a native of Sassina in Umbria, was a soldier in the seventh cohort of the Praetorian Guard at Rome, in the century of Taurus, and was buried at Rome, aged twenty-five, having served for five years, in a tomb dating to the late first or early second century.
- Quintus Tanusius Terentianus, a native of Arretium in Etruria, was a soldier serving at Rome during the reign of Antoninus Pius, in the century of Severus.
- Tanusius Martinianus, buried in a fourth- or fifth-century tomb at Rome.

=== Undated Tanusii ===
- Marcus Tanusius C. f., named in a sepulchral inscription from the present site of Scansano, formerly part of Etruria.
- Lucius Tanusius Felix, buried at Aquileia in Venetia and Histria.
- Gaius Tanusius Luppus, a veteran of the urban cohorts, buried at Sullectum in Africa Proconsularis.

== See also ==
- List of Roman gentes

== Bibliography ==
- Quintus Tullius Cicero, De Petitione Consulatus (attributed).
- Lucius Annaeus Seneca (Seneca the Younger), Epistulae Morales ad Lucilium (Moral Letters to Lucilius).
- Lucius Mestrius Plutarchus (Plutarch), Lives of the Noble Greeks and Romans.
- Gaius Suetonius Tranquillus, De Vita Caesarum (Lives of the Caesars, or The Twelve Caesars).
- Gerardus Vossius, De Historicis Latinis (The Latin Historians), Jan Maire, Brittenburg (1627).
- Dictionary of Greek and Roman Biography and Mythology, William Smith, ed., Little, Brown and Company, Boston (1849).
- Theodor Mommsen et alii, Corpus Inscriptionum Latinarum (The Body of Latin Inscriptions, abbreviated CIL), Berlin-Brandenburgische Akademie der Wissenschaften (1853–present).
- Wilhelm Henzen, Ephemeris Epigraphica: Corporis Inscriptionum Latinarum Supplementum (Journal of Inscriptions: Supplement to the Corpus Inscriptionum Latinarum, abbreviated EE), Institute of Roman Archaeology, Rome (1872–1913).
- Notizie degli Scavi di Antichità (News of Excavations from Antiquity, abbreviated NSA), Accademia dei Lincei (1876–present).
- René Cagnat et alii, L'Année épigraphique (The Year in Epigraphy, abbreviated AE), Presses Universitaires de France (1888–present).
