= Planned Invasion =

Planned Invasion may refer to:

- Caesar's planned invasion of Parthia
- Planned French invasion of Britain (1708)
- Planned French invasion of Britain (1744)
- Planned French invasion of Britain (1759), an abandoned invasion of Britain in 1759
- Napoleon's invasion of the United Kingdom, a French plan to invade Britain in 1803–04
- Operation Sea Lion, a German plan to invade Britain in 1940
- Operation Tannenbaum, a German plan to invade Switzerland in 1940
- Proposed Japanese invasion of Australia during World War II, a Japanese plan to invade Australia in 1942
- Proposed Japanese invasion of Sichuan, during the Second Sino-Japanese War (1937–1945)
- Proposed Japanese invasion of Soviet Union during World War II, 1941
- Operation Downfall, an Allied plan to invade Japan in 1945–46
- Proposed United States invasion of Venezuela
