= Phraates IV =

King of Kings of the Parthian Empire from 37 to 2 BC

Phraates IV 𐭐𐭓𐭇𐭕
- Great King, King of Kings, Arsaces
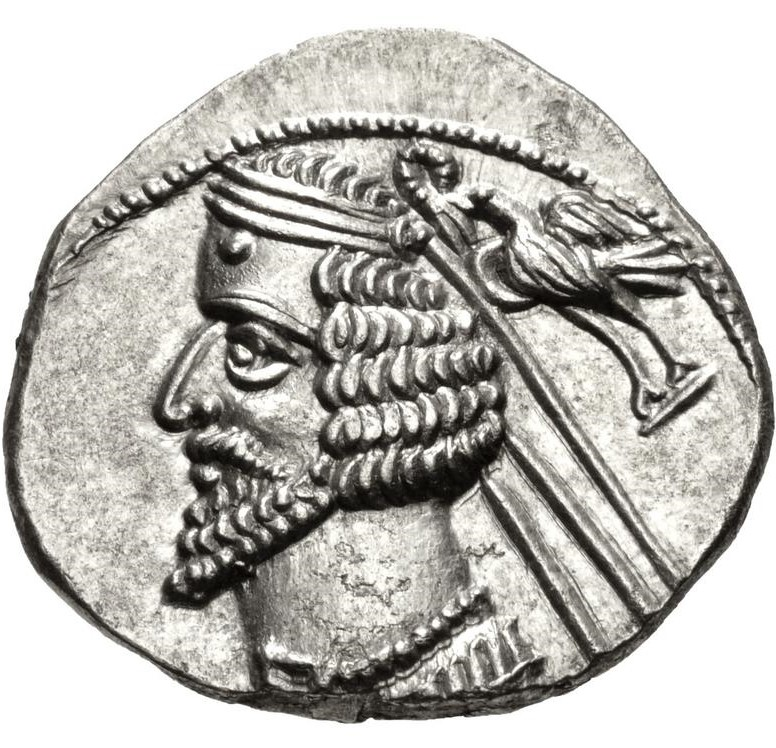
- Coin of Phraates IV, Mithradatkert mint

King of the Parthian Empire
- Reign: 37–2 BC
- Predecessor: Orodes II
- Successor: Phraates V and Musa
- Died: 2 BC
- Spouse: Olennieire, Cleopatra, Baseirta, Bistheibanaps, Musa
- Issue: Vonones I, Phraates, Seraspandes, Rhodaspes, Karen, Phraates V
- Dynasty: Arsacid dynasty
- Father: Orodes II
- Religion: Zoroastrianism

Phraates IV (also spelled Frahad IV; Parthian: 𐭐𐭓𐭇𐭕 Frahāt) was King of Kings of the Parthian Empire from 37 to 2 BC. He was the son and successor of Orodes II (r. 57–37 BC), and was given the throne after the death of his brother Pacorus I. Phraates IV soon murdered all his brothers, and also possibly his father. His actions alienated the Armenians and also some of his nobles, including the distinguished Monaeses, who fled to the Roman triumvir Mark Antony, but shortly returned and reconciled with Phraates IV.

Phraates IV was attacked in 36 BC by Mark Antony, who marched through Armenia into Media Atropatene, and was defeated and lost the greater part of his army. Antony, believing himself betrayed by Artavasdes II, king of Armenia, invaded his kingdom in 34 BC, took him prisoner, and concluded a treaty with Artavasdes I, king of Media Atropatene. But when the war with Octavian broke out, Antony could not maintain his conquests; Phraates IV recovered Media Atropatene and made Artaxias, the son of Artavasdes II, king of Armenia.

Around the same time, Phraates IV's throne was usurped by Tiridates II, but he quickly managed to reestablish his rule with the aid of Scythian nomads. Tiridates fled to the Romans, taking one of Phraates IV's sons with him. In negotiations conducted in 20 BC, Phraates IV arranged for the release of his kidnapped son. In return, the Romans received the lost legionary standards taken at Carrhae in 53 BC, as well as any surviving prisoners of war. The Parthians viewed this exchange as a small price to pay to regain the prince.

Along with the prince, Octavian (now known as Augustus) gave Phraates IV a girl named Musa, who quickly became queen and a favourite of Phraates IV, giving birth to Phraataces (Phraates V). Seeking to secure the throne for her son, Musa convinced Phraates IV to send his four first-born sons (Vonones, Phraates, Seraspandes and Rhodaspes) to Rome in order to prevent conflict over his succession. In 2 BC, Musa had Phraates IV poisoned and made herself along with Phraates V the co-rulers of the empire.

== Name ==
Phraátēs (Φραάτης) is the Greek form of the Parthian Frahāt (𐭐𐭓𐭇𐭕), itself from the Old Iranian *Frahāta- ("gained, earned"). The Modern Persian version is Farhād (فرهاد).

== Consolidation of power ==
In 38 BC, the heir to the Parthian throne, Pacorus I was defeated and killed at the Battle of Mount Gindarus by a Roman force. His death spurred a succession crisis in which Orodes II (r. 57–37 BC), deeply afflicted by the death of his favourite son, relinquished the throne to his other son Phraates IV. Orodes II died soon afterwards. His cause of death is uncertain. According to Cassius Dio, he had either died of grief due to Pacorus' death, or of old age. Plutarch, however, states that Orodes was murdered by Phraates IV. Fearing that his position might become endangered, Phraates IV executed all his half-brothers–the sons of Orodes and his Commagenian wife Laodice, partially due to their maternal descent being greater than that of his own. Laodice was probably killed as well.

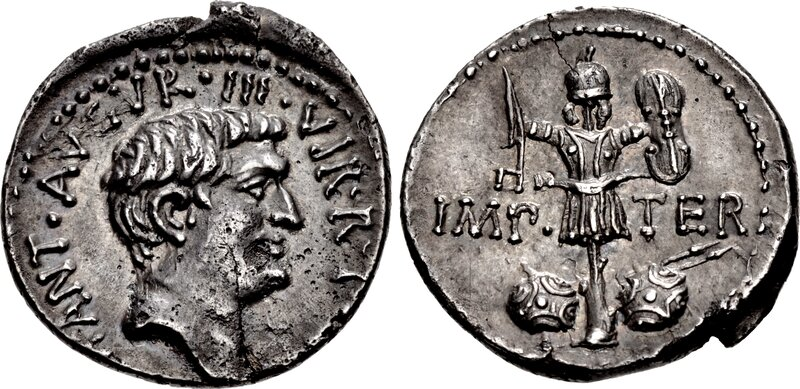
Coin of Mark Antony

Phraates IV also had supporters of his brothers and his own opponents sent into exile; one of them, Monaeses, a Parthian nobleman who had distinguished himself as a military leader under Orodes II, fled to Syria, where he took refuge with the Roman triumvir Mark Antony. There Monaeses urged him to attack Parthia, and promised him to spearhead the troops and conquer the empire without any difficulties. Antony granted Monaeses three cities—Larissa, Hierapolis and Arethusa, and promised him the Parthian throne. Around the same time, Antony had restored Roman rule in Jerusalem, and executed the King of the Jews Antigonus II Mattathias, who was succeeded by Herod the Great. The relations between Parthia and Armenia had also been damaged, due to the death of Pacorus I (who was married into the Armenian royal house) and Phraates IV's treatment of his brothers and some of the nobility, which upset the Armenians. The Parthians took the defection of Monaeses very serious, and as a result Phraates IV invited Monaeses back to the country and reconciled with him.

== War with Mark Antony ==
Map of the Parthian–Roman borders

The following year, when Antony marched to Theodosiopolis, Artavasdes II of Armenia defected to the Roman side by sending Antony additional troops. Antony invaded Media Atropatene, then ruled by Parthia's ally Artavasdes I, with the intention of seizing the capital Praaspa, the location of which is now unknown. However, Phraates IV ambushed Antony's rear detachment, destroying a giant battering ram meant for the siege of Praaspa; after this, Artavasdes II abandoned Antony's forces. The Parthians pursued and harassed Antony's army as it fled to Armenia. Eventually, the greatly weakened force reached Syria.

The defeat of Antony, along with that of Crassus at Carrhae in 53 BC, would be remembered by Romans for a long period, and often incited them to invade Parthia in later events. After this, Antony lured Artavasdes II into a trap with the promise of a marriage alliance. He was taken captive in 34 BC, paraded in Antony's mock Roman triumph in Alexandria, Egypt, and eventually executed by Cleopatra VII of the Ptolemaic Kingdom. Antony attempted to strike an alliance with Artavasdes I of Media Atropatene, whose relations with Phraates IV had recently soured. This was abandoned when Antony and his forces withdrew from Armenia in 33 BC; they escaped a Parthian invasion while Antony's rival Octavian attacked his forces to the west. According to Cassius Dio, Phraates IV murdered the Commagenian King Antiochus I in c. 31 BC. Following Antony's suicide in Egypt followed by that of his wife Cleopatra in 30 BC, the Parthian ally Artaxias II reassumed the throne of Armenia.

== Brief overthrow, diplomatic correspondence with Augustus and death ==
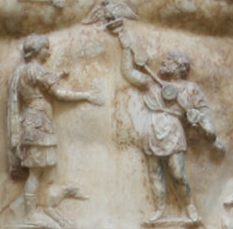
A close-up view of the breastplate on the statue of Augustus of Prima Porta, showing a Parthian man returning to Augustus the legionary standards lost by Marcus Licinius Crassus at Carrhae

Following the defeat of Antony and Cleopatra of Ptolemaic Egypt at the Battle of Actium in 31 BC, Octavian consolidated his political power and in 27 BC was named Augustus by the Roman Senate, becoming the first Roman emperor. Around this time, Tiridates II of Parthia briefly overthrew Phraates IV, who was able to quickly reestablish his rule with the aid of Scythian nomads. Tiridates fled to the Romans, taking one of Phraates IV's sons with him. In negotiations conducted in 20 BC, Phraates IV arranged for the release of his kidnapped son. In return, the Romans received the lost legionary standards taken at Carrhae in 53 BC, as well as any surviving prisoners of war. The Parthians viewed this exchange as a small price to pay to regain the prince. Augustus hailed the return of the standards as a political victory over Parthia; this propaganda was celebrated in the minting of new coins, the building of a new temple to house the standards, and even in fine art such as the breastplate scene on his statue Augustus of Prima Porta.

Along with the prince, Augustus gave Phraates IV a slave-girl named Musa, who quickly became queen and a favourite of Phraates IV, giving birth to Phraataces (Phraates V). Emma Strugnell (2008) has suggested that Augustus' choice to send Musa may have been an attempt to obtain information or influence the Parthian king to the advantage of the Romans. She further adds that "Augustus could potentially launch a punitive invasion against Parthia, with the probable aim of converting it into a Roman province." According to the Parchments of Avroman, Phraates IV had already at least four other queens at that time: Olennieire, Cleopatra, Baseirta and Bistheibanaps.

Seeking to secure the throne for her son, Musa convinced Phraates IV in 10/9 BC to send his four first-born sons (Vonones, Phraates, Seraspandes and Rhodaspes) to Rome in order to prevent conflict over his succession. Again, Augustus used this as propaganda depicting the submission of Parthia to Rome, listing it as a great accomplishment in his Res Gestae Divi Augusti. In 2 BC, Musa had the aged Phraates IV poisoned and made herself along with Phraates V the co-rulers of the empire.

== Coinage ==
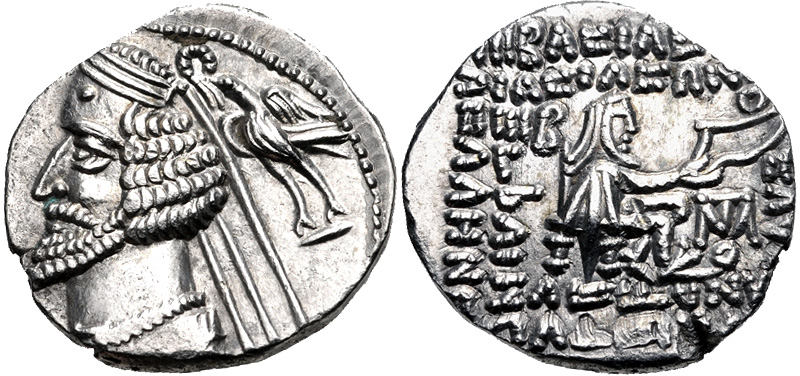
Coin of Phraates IV, Mithradatkert mint

Under Phraates IV and his father, the production of coins reached its zenith, with the only Parthian ruler having similar numbers being Mithridates II (r. 124–88 BC). Phraates IV mostly kept the same style of Parthian coinage that was used under his father. The obverse of his coins portrays him with short hair and beard, along with a visible moustache. According to the modern historian Vesta Sarkhosh Curtis, the portrait greatly resembles the Shami statue, discovered in the Bakhtiari mountains in southwestern Iran, and currently stored in the National Museum of Iran in Tehran. A bird of prey is present behind his head, which is associated with the khvarenah, i.e. kingly glory. The bird, possibly a symbol of the bird of the deity Verethragna, is holding a diadem, a wreath or a ring.

The reverse depicts a seated archer wearing a soft cap (bashlyk) and sitting on a throne. Curtis notes its close resemblance to the thrones of the Achaemenid monarchs portrayed on the rock reliefs at Persepolis. Other reverse of his coins, however depicts an investiture scene, where Orodes is receiving a scepter by the Greek goddess Tyche. In the Parthian era, Iranians used Hellenistic iconography to portray their divine figures, thus the investiture scene can be associated with the khvarenah, with Tyche being either a representation of Anahita or Ashi. The titling of Phraates IV on his coinage was: "[coin] of the King of Kings, Arsakes, Just, Benefactor, Illustrious, Philhellene."

== Family ==
=== Marriages ===
Phraates IV had the following wives:

- Olennieire
- Cleopatra
- Baseirta
- Bistheibanaps
- Musa

=== Issue ===
- Vonones I, eldest son and Parthian King from 8 to 12. Subsequently King of Armenia from 12 to 18.
- Phraates, one of his first-born sons, attempted to take the Parthian throne from Artabanus II in 35.
- Seraspandes, one of his first-born sons, sent to Rome, where he remained till his death.
- Rhodaspes, one of his first-born sons, sent to Rome, where he remained till his death.
- Karen, the eponymous founder of the House of Karen, one of the Seven Great Houses of Iran.
- Unnamed daughter, who was the mother of Artabanus II.
- Phraataces (Phraates V), Parthian King from 2 BC to 4 AD.

== Bibliography ==
=== Ancient works ===
- Cassius Dio, Roman History
- Plutarch, Parallel Lives

=== Modern works ===
- Bivar, A.D.H. (1983). "The Political History of Iran Under the Arsacids". In Yarshater, Ehsan (ed.). The Cambridge History of Iran: The Seleucid, Parthian and Sasanian Periods. Vol. 3(1). Cambridge: Cambridge University Press. pp. 21–99. ISBN 0-521-20092-X.
- Bigwood, J. M. (2004). "Queen Mousa, Mother and Wife(?) of King Phraatakes of Parthia: A Re-evaluation of the Evidence". Journal of the Classical Association of Canada. 4 (1). Project Muse: 35–70. doi:10.1353/mou.2004.0027. S2CID 164436127.
- Bigwood, Joan M. (2008). "Some Parthian Queens in Greek and Babylonian Documents". Iranica Antiqua. 43: 235–274. doi:10.2143/IA.43.0.2024050.
- Boyce, Mary (1984). Zoroastrians: Their Religious Beliefs and Practices. Psychology Press. pp. 1–252. ISBN 9780415239028.
- Boyce, Mary; Grenet, Frantz (1991). Beck, Roger (ed.). A History of Zoroastrianism, Zoroastrianism under Macedonian and Roman Rule. Leiden: Brill. ISBN 978-9004293915.
- Brosius, Maria (2000). "Women i. In Pre-Islamic Persia". Encyclopædia Iranica, online edition. New York.
- Brosius, Maria (2006), The Persians: An Introduction, London & New York: Routledge, ISBN 978-0-415-32089-4
- Bringmann, Klaus (2007) [2002]. A History of the Roman Republic. Translated by W. J. Smyth. Cambridge: Polity Press. ISBN 978-0-7456-3371-8.
- Burstein, Stanley M. (2004), The Reign of Cleopatra, Westport, CT: Greenwood Press, ISBN 978-0-313-32527-4.
- Curtis, Vesta Sarkhosh (2007). "Religious Iconography on Ancient Iranian coins". Journal of Late Antiquity. London: 413–434.
- Curtis, Vesta Sarkhosh (2012). "Parthian Coins: Kingship and Divine Glory": 67–83.
- Curtis, Vesta Sarkhosh (2016). "Ancient Iranian Motifs and Zoroastrian Iconography". In Williams, Markus; Stewart, Sarah; Hintze, Almut (eds.). The Zoroastrian Flame Exploring Religion, History and Tradition. I.B. Tauris. pp. 179–203. ISBN 9780857728159.
- Dąbrowa, Edward (2012). "The Arsacid Empire". In Daryaee, Touraj (ed.). The Oxford Handbook of Iranian History. Oxford University Press. pp. 1–432. ISBN 978-0-19-987575-7.
- Dąbrowa, Edward (2017). "Tacitus on the Parthians". Electrum. 42: 171–189. doi:10.4467/20800909EL.17.026.7508.
- Dąbrowa, Edward (2018). "Arsacid Dynastic Marriages". Electrum. 25: 73–83. doi:10.4467/20800909EL.18.005.8925.
- Garthwaite, Gene Ralph (2005), The Persians, Oxford & Carlton: Blackwell Publishing, Ltd., ISBN 978-1-55786-860-2.
- Kia, Mehrdad (2016). The Persian Empire: A Historical Encyclopedia [2 volumes]. ABC-CLIO. ISBN 978-1610693912.
- Kennedy, David (1996), "Parthia and Rome: Eastern Perspectives", in Kennedy, David L.; Braund, David (eds.), The Roman Army in the East, Ann Arbor: Cushing Malloy Inc., Journal of Roman Archaeology: Supplementary Series Number Eighteen, pp. 67–90, ISBN 978-1-887829-18-2
- Metcalf, William E. (2016). The Oxford Handbook of Greek and Roman Coinage. Oxford: Oxford University Press. ISBN 9780199372188.
- Olbrycht, Marek Jan (2014). "The Genealogy of Artabanos II (AD 8/9–39/40), King of Parthia": 92–97. doi:10.6084/M9.FIGSHARE.12400685.V2.
- Olbrycht, Marek Jan (2016). "Dynastic Connections in the Arsacid Empire and the Origins of the House of Sāsān". In Curtis, Vesta Sarkhosh; Pendleton, Elizabeth J.; Alram, Michael; Daryaee, Touraj (eds.). The Parthian and Early Sasanian Empires: Adaptation and Expansion. Oxbow Books. ISBN 9781785702082.
- Pourshariati, Parvaneh (2017). "Kārin". Encyclopædia Iranica, online edition. New York.
- Rezakhani, Khodadad (2013). "Arsacid, Elymaean, and Persid Coinage". In Potts, Daniel T. (ed.). The Oxford Handbook of Ancient Iran. Oxford University Press. ISBN 978-0199733309.
- Richardson, J.S. (2012). Augustan Rome 44 BC to AD 14: The Restoration of the Republic and the Establishment of the Empire. Edinburgh University Press. ISBN 978-0-7486-1954-2.
- Roller, Duane W. (2010), Cleopatra: A Biography, Oxford: Oxford University Press, ISBN 978-0-19-536553-5.
- Russell, James R. (1987). Zoroastrianism in Armenia. Harvard University Press. ISBN 978-0674968509.
- Schippmann, K. (1986). "Arsacids ii. The Arsacid Dynasty". Encyclopædia Iranica, online edition, Vol. II, Fasc. 5. pp. 525–536.
- Schmitt, Rüdiger (2005). "Personal Names, Iranian iv. Parthian Period". Encyclopædia Iranica, online edition. New York.
- Strugnell, Emma (2006), "Ventidius' Parthian War: Rome's Forgotten Eastern Triumph", Acta Antiqua, 46 (3): 239–252, doi:10.1556/AAnt.46.2006.3.3
- Strugnell, Emma (2008). "Thea Musa, Roman Queen of Parthia". Iranica Antiqua. 43: 275–298. doi:10.2143/IA.43.0.2024051.
- Widengren, G. (1986). "Antiochus of Commagene". Encyclopædia Iranica, online edition, Vol. II, Fasc. 2. pp. 135–136.

Phraates IV Arsacid dynasty Died: 2 BC
Preceded by Orodes II	King of the Parthian Empire; 37–2 BC	Succeeded by Phraates V
