= Musa of Parthia =

Co-ruler of the Parthian Empire

Musa
- Basilissa
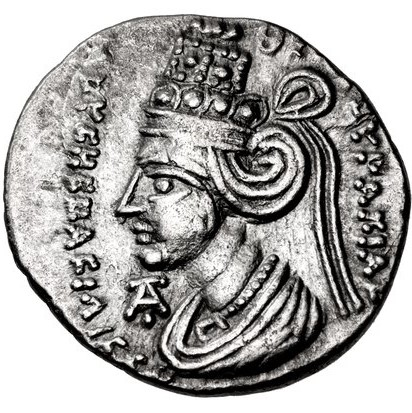
- The portrait of Musa on the reverse of a Parthian drachm, Ecbatana mint

Queen of the Parthian Empire
- Reign: 2 BC – 4 AD
- Predecessor: Phraates IV
- Successor: Orodes III
- Co-ruler: Phraates V (2 BC – 4 AD)
- Died: 1st-century AD
- Spouse: Phraates IV
- Issue: Phraates V

Musa (also spelled Mousa), also known as Thea Musa, was the reigning queen of the Parthian Empire from 2 BC to 4 AD.

Originally an Italian slave-girl, Augustus gifted her to Phraates IV. She quickly became queen and a favourite of Phraates IV, giving birth to a son, Phraataces, who would later be known as Phraates V. In 2 BC, she had Phraates IV poisoned and made herself, along with Phraates V, the co-rulers of Parthia. Their reign was short-lived; they were forced to flee to Rome after being deposed by the Parthian nobility, who crowned Orodes III as king.

Musa is the first of only three women to rule as monarchs in Iranian history, the others being the two 7th-century Sasanian sisters Boran (r. 630–630, 631–632) and Azarmidokht (r. 630–631). Other female rulers, Rinnu, Ifra Hormizd and Denag, ruled only as regents of their sons, not as reigning monarchs in their own right.

== Rise to power ==
Musa was an Italian slave-girl who was given to the Parthian monarch Phraates IV (r. 37 BC – 2 BC) as a gift by the Roman Emperor Augustus (r. 27 BC – 14 AD). Phraates IV received her around the time a treaty was made in 20 BC, whereby he received his kidnapped son in exchange for returning several Roman legionary standards captured at the Battle of Carrhae in 53 BC, and the surviving Roman prisoners of war. The Parthians viewed this as a small price to pay to regain the prince. Emma Strugnell (2008) has suggested that Augustus may have sent Musa in an attempt to obtain information or influence the Parthian king to the advantage of the Romans.

According to the Parchments of Avroman, Phraates IV already had at least four other queens at that time: Olennieire, Cleopatra, Baseirta and Bistheibanaps. Musa quickly became queen and a favourite of Phraates IV, giving birth to Phraataces (Phraates V) about 19 BC. Seeking to secure the throne for her son, she convinced Phraates IV in 10/9 BC to send his four first-born sons to Rome in order to prevent conflict over his succession.

== Reign ==
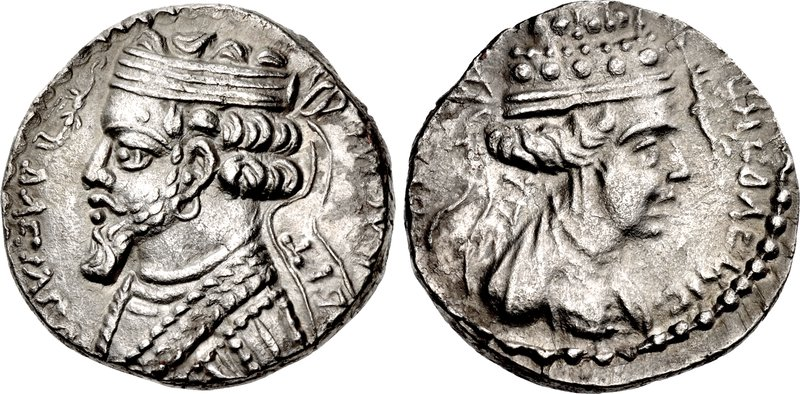
Coin of Phraates V, showing his mother, Musa, on the reverse. Minted at Seleucia

In 2 BC, Musa had Phraates IV poisoned and made herself and Phraates V the co-rulers of the Parthian Empire. The reverse of Phraates V's later coins notably has an image of his mother, Musa, with a circular legend labelling her as "heavenly", contrary to the square legends which had been typical on Parthian coins, implying that they were at least co-rulers. Furthermore, the title of basilissa ("queen") was given to her by Phraates V, which was not necessarily only used by the wife of the king in the Hellenistic era, but also other royal women.

The 1st-century Roman historian Josephus noted allegations that Musa married her son. However, there is no other evidence that supports or contradicts Josephus' claim; and neither under the Parthians, nor their Iranian predecessors—the Achaemenids—is there reliable evidence that marriage was practiced between parents and their children. The modern historian Joan M. Bigwood calls the report of Josephus "seriously misleading", and points out its striking similarities to the story of the Assyrian queen Semiramis, deducing that his account of Musa was most likely derived from a common folk tale. Leonardo Gregoratti likewise questions the historicity of Josephus' report, calling it "pseudo-historical." He argues that the latter created a "fictional role for the Parthian women to prove the institutional weakness of the Arsacids."

After a short rule, the Parthian nobility, angered by Phraates V's recent acknowledgement of Roman suzerainty in Armenia and his mother's Italian slave descent, deposed them both from the throne and installed a certain Orodes III as king. Phraates V and Musa fled to Rome, where Augustus welcomed them.

== Alleged portraits ==
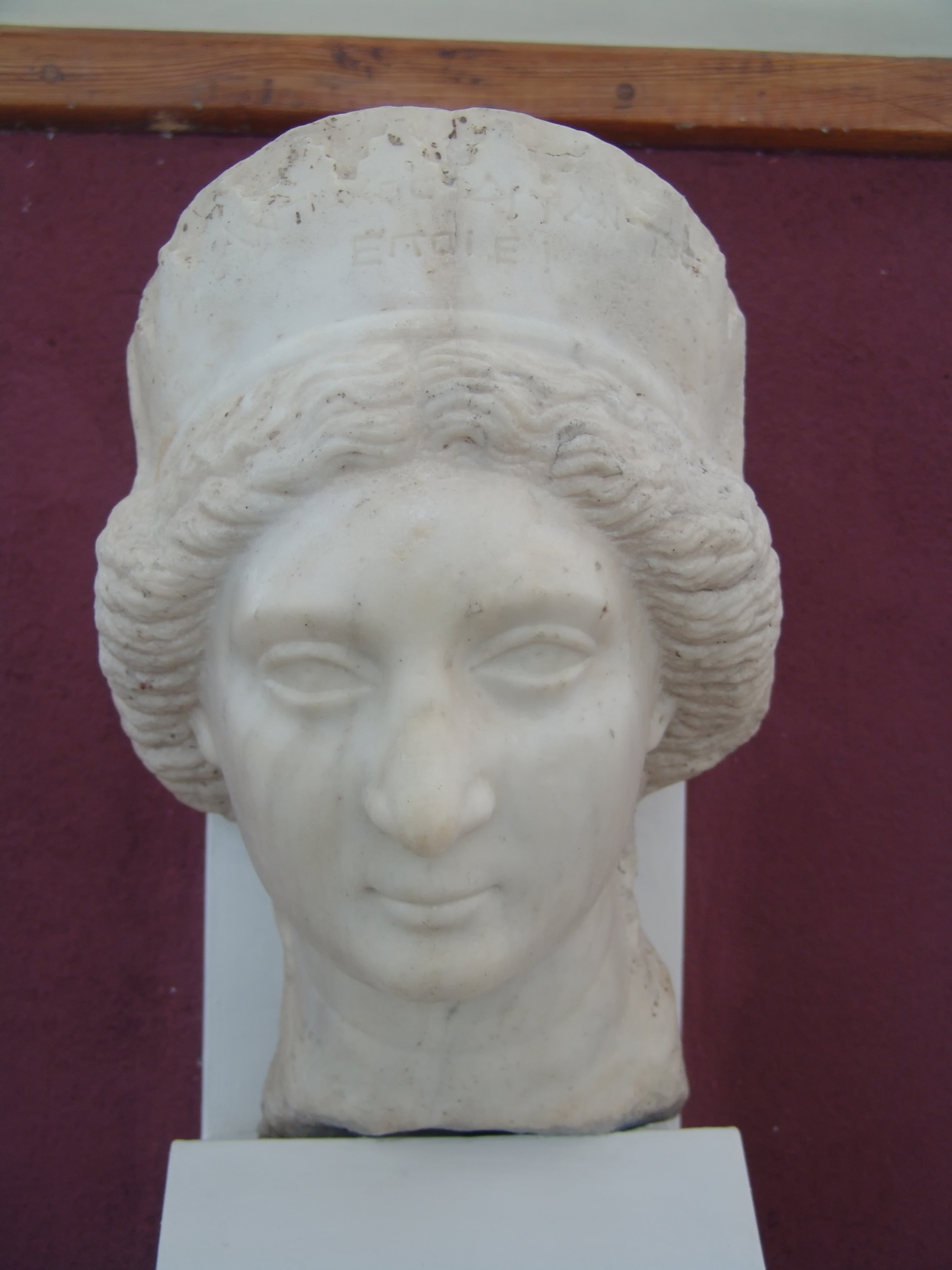
A Greek bust found in Susa, which was initially thought be that of Musa, now in the National Museum of Iran

Some portraits have been attributed to Musa, including a gold ring and a gem. However, these links with Musa have subsequently been questioned.

A bust of a female figure from Susa—uncovered in 1939 by the archeologist Roland de Mecquenem—made by a Greek artist named Antiochus, was first attributed to Musa by the Belgian archeologist Franz Cumont. This attribution was agreed by several other scholars. The facial characteristics of the bust, however, has little in common with that of the coins of Musa. The bust is wearing a crown with crenellations, resembling those worn in the Achaemenid era, while the coins of Musa portrayed her wearing a diadem along with a jewelled crown with three layers. The crown with crenellations, albeit often worn by members of the royal family, was also worn by deities. The Greek goddess Tyche is sometimes portrayed with a similar crown on Parthian coins. As a result, some scholars have suggested the bust is a portrayal of Tyche.

== Sources ==
- Bigwood, Joan M. (2004). "Queen Mousa, Mother and Wife(?) of King Phraatakes of Parthia: A Re-evaluation of the Evidence". Journal of the Classical Association of Canada. 4 (1). Project Muse: 35–70. doi:10.1353/mou.2004.0027. S2CID 164436127.
- Bivar, A.D.H. (1983). "The Political History of Iran Under the Arsacids". In Yarshater, Ehsan (ed.). The Cambridge History of Iran: The Seleucid, Parthian and Sasanian Periods. Vol. 3(1). Cambridge: Cambridge University Press. pp. 21–99. ISBN 0-521-20092-X.
- Cumont, Franz (1939). "Portrait d'une reine trouvé à Suse". Comptes Rendus des Séances de l'Académie des Inscriptions et Belles-Lettres. 83 (3): 330–341. OCLC 1014584127.
- Dąbrowa, Edward (2012). "The Arsacid Empire". In Daryaee, Touraj (ed.). The Oxford Handbook of Iranian History. Oxford University Press. pp. 1–432. ISBN 978-0-19-987575-7. Archived from the original on 2019-01-01.
- Garthwaite, Gene Ralph (2005), The Persians, Oxford & Carlton: Blackwell Publishing, Ltd., ISBN 978-1-55786-860-2
- Gregoratti, Leonardo (2012). Hirschberger, Martina (ed.). "Parthian Women in Flavius Josephus". Jüdisch-hellenistische Literatur in Ihrem Interkulturellen Kontext: 183–192.
- Kia, Mehrdad (2016). The Persian Empire: A Historical Encyclopedia [2 volumes]. Santa Barbara: ABC-CLIO. ISBN 978-1610693912.
- Marciak, Michał (2017). Sophene, Gordyene, and Adiabene: Three Regna Minora of Northern Mesopotamia Between East and West. BRILL. ISBN 9789004350724.
- Rezakhani, Khodadad (2013). "Arsacid, Elymaean, and Persid Coinage". In Potts, Daniel T. (ed.). The Oxford Handbook of Ancient Iran. Oxford University Press. pp. 766–777. ISBN 978-0199733309.
- Richardson, J.S. (2012). Augustan Rome 44 BC to AD 14: The Restoration of the Republic and the Establishment of the Empire. Edinburgh University Press. ISBN 978-0-7486-1954-2.
- Schippmann, K. (1986). "Arsacids ii. The Arsacid dynasty". In Yarshater, Ehsan (ed.). Encyclopædia Iranica. Vol. II/5: Armenia and Iran IV–Art in Iran I. London and New York: Routledge & Kegan Paul. pp. 525–536. ISBN 978-0-71009-105-5.
- Schlude, Jason M. (2020). Search Results Web results Rome, Parthia, and the Politics of Peace. New York: Routledge. ISBN 9-781-35113-569-6.
- Strugnell, Emma (2006), "Ventidius' Parthian War: Rome's Forgotten Eastern Triumph", Acta Antiqua, 46 (3): 239–252, doi:10.1556/AAnt.46.2006.3.3
- Strugnell, Emma (2008). "Thea Musa, Roman Queen of Parthia". Iranica Antiqua. 43: 275–298. doi:10.2143/IA.43.0.2024051.

Musa of Parthia Arsacid dynasty
Preceded by Phraates IV	Queen of the Parthian Empire; 2 BC–4 AD; Joint ruler with Phraates V	Succeeded by Orodes III
