= Monaeses (nobleman) =

Monaeses (Greek: Μοναίσης Monaísēs; also spelled Moneses or Monneses) was a Parthian nobleman.

In 37 BCE, he fled from the Parthian king Phraates IV to the Roman triumvir Mark Antony; called by W W Tarn (in CAH 10.71) the "Warden of the Western Marches" (the western approaches into Parthia from Syria), Monaeses negotiated with Antony offering his help against Phraates IV in exchange for not only the throne of Parthia but also including, for a time (not permanently), the income from the "small token principality in eastern Syria that Antony gave Monaeses, as a sort of "government in exile," [which] consisted of the three Greek cities of Larissa (modern Shaizar), Arethusa (Al-Rastan), and Hierapolis Cyrrhestica (Manbij)."

However, "after learning Antony's plans [to keep his baggage train far behind to move the front forward quickly], he returned to Parthia and assumed command of the Parthian forces against Antony (CAH 10.71-72)." Monaeses thereafter reconciled with the Parthian King later (who no doubt bribed him back in even larger ways than had Antony) and returned to Parthia so that in 36 BCE, Antony campaigned against Parthia while Monaeses was prepared to play a key role in Antony's defeat by attacking his baggage train and siege engines in Atropatene.

Antony couldn't destroy Monaeses in retaliation for this betrayal for fear of alienating the rest of the Roman friendly Parthian nobles he still needed for his wider plans in Parthia in the years to come. For his part, Monaeses also did not want to alienate Antony completely and so later had his cousin, Mithradates, show Antony a route of retreat.
