= Meherdates =

1st century AD Parthian prince who competed against Gotarzes II for the Parthian crown

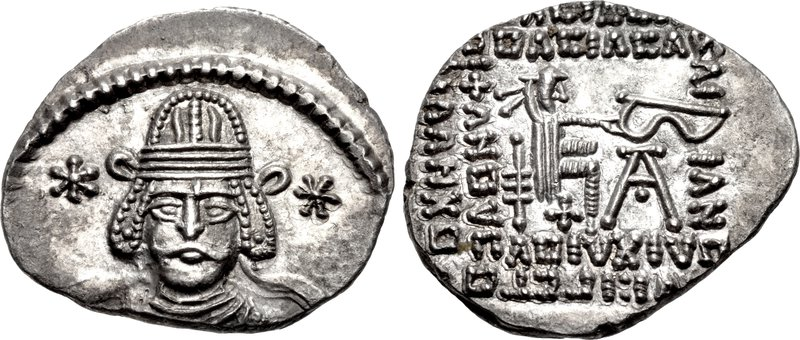
- Coin of Meherdates

King of the Parthian Empire
- Reign: 49 – 51 AD
- Predecessor: Gotarzes II
- Successor: Gotarzes II
- Died: Unknown
- Dynasty: Arsacid dynasty
- Father: Vonones I
- Religion: Zoroastrianism

Meherdates (Parthian: 𐭌𐭄𐭓𐭃𐭕 Mihrdāt) was a Parthian prince who competed against Gotarzes II (r. 40–51) for the Parthian crown from 49 to 51 AD. A son of Vonones I (r. 8–12), he was ultimately defeated and captured by Gotarzes II, who spared him, but had his ears mutilated, an act that disqualified him from inheriting the throne.

== Sources ==
- Bivar, A.D.H. (1968). "The Political History of Iran Under the Arsacids". In Fischer, William B. (ed.). The Cambridge History of Iran. Vol. 3a. Cambridge: Cambridge University Press. pp. 21–99. ISBN 0-521-06935-1.
- Dąbrowa, Edward (2010). "The Arsacids and their State". XI: 21–52.
- Dąbrowa, Edward (2017). "Tacitus on the Parthians": 171–189.

Meherdates Arsacid dynasty
Preceded by Gotarzes II	King of the Parthian Empire; 49–51	Succeeded by Gotarzes II
