= Empylus =

1st-century BC Rhodian rhetorician and historian

Empylus of Rhodes was a Rhodian rhetorician and historian of the 1st century BC. He was a companion and housemate of Marcus Junius Brutus, and wrote a short historical work entitled Brutus about the assassination of Julius Caesar.

== Life ==
Empylus lived in Rome in the household of Brutus and was mentioned by Brutus and his friends in their letters. A rhetorician named Empylus Rhodius is also mentioned by Quintilian, who, attributing the information to Cicero, describes him as an orator renowned for being able to reproduce in delivery what he had composed or thought out word for word.

== Works ==
Empylus wrote a short work entitled Brutus, concerning the assassination of Julius Caesar. Plutarch describes it as a brief but excellent account of Caesar's assassination. The work is lost and is known only from fragmentary evidence, catalogued as FHG III 327 and FGrH 191.

Empylus's Brutus appears to have been one of the sources used by Plutarch in his Life of Brutus. Modern scholarship has identified possible traces of Empylus's account in several parts of the Life, particularly in passages concerning the relationship and characters of Brutus and Cassius and the recruitment of the conspirators. Empylus's account appears to have been strongly favorable towards Brutus and the conspirators, although it may preserve historically significant information alongside material of questionable reliability.
