= Karen (son of Phraates IV) =

Karen (Parthian: 𐭊𐭓𐭍𐭉, Kārēn) was a Parthian prince, who is considered the eponymous founder of the House of Karen, one of the Seven Great Houses of Iran.

According to the 5th-century Armenian historian Movses Khorenatsi, Karen was one of the sons of the Parthian king Phraates IV (r. 37 – 2 BC). Although the factuality of this statement has been the subject of debate, it is most likely valid. Due to the long history of the Parthians in Armenia, who had since the 1st-century under Tiridates I of Armenia established themselves in the country, Khorenatsi was most likely familiar with the lore of the local Parthian families in Armenia, such as the Kamsarakan, who were descendants of the House of Karen.

== Sources ==
- Pourshariati, Parvaneh (2017). "Kārin". Encyclopaedia Iranica.
- Pourshariati, Parvaneh (2008). Decline and Fall of the Sasanian Empire: The Sasanian-Parthian Confederacy and the Arab Conquest of Iran. London and New York: I.B. Tauris. ISBN 978-1-84511-645-3.
