= Orodes III of Parthia =

Orodes III 𐭅𐭓𐭅𐭃
- King of Kings
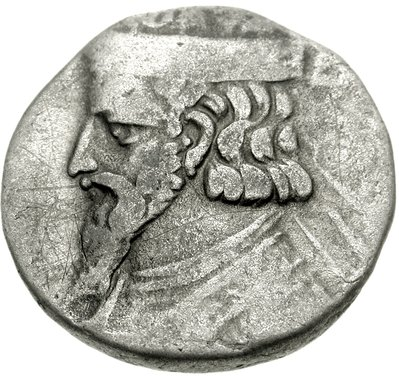
- Tetradrachm of Orodes III, minted at Seleucia in c. 6

King of the Parthian Empire
- Reign: 4 – 6
- Predecessor: Phraates V and Musa
- Successor: Vonones I
- Died: 6
- Dynasty: Arsacid dynasty
- Religion: Zoroastrianism

Orodes III (also spelled Urud III; Parthian: 𐭅𐭓𐭅𐭃 Wērōd) was king of the Parthian Empire from 4 to 6 AD. Albeit he was an Arsacid, his lineage is unknown. He was raised to the throne by the nobility after the death of the previous co-rulers, Phraates V and Musa (r. 2 BC – 4 AD). Information regarding the brief reign of Orodes III is lacking. He was killed after a reign of 2 years. He was succeeded by Vonones I.

== Sources ==
- Dąbrowa, Edward (2012). "The Arsacid Empire". In Daryaee, Touraj (ed.). The Oxford Handbook of Iranian History. Oxford University Press. pp. 1–432. ISBN 978-0-19-987575-7. Archived from the original on 1 January 2019.
- Kia, Mehrdad (2016). The Persian Empire: A Historical Encyclopedia [2 volumes]. ABC-CLIO. ISBN 978-1610693912.
- Olbrycht, Marek Jan (2014). "The Genealogy of Artabanos II (AD 8/9–39/40), King of Parthia". Miscellanea Anthropologica et Sociologica. 15 (3): 92–97. doi:10.5604/20842937.1134333 (inactive 1 July 2025).

Orodes III of Parthia Arsacid dynasty Died: 6
| Preceded by Phraates V | King of the Parthian Empire; 4–6 | Succeeded by Vonones I |
