= Julius Caesar's planned invasion of the Parthian Empire =

Military campaign that Gaius Julius Caesar never executed

Caesar's planned invasion of Parthia
- Part of the Roman–Parthian Wars
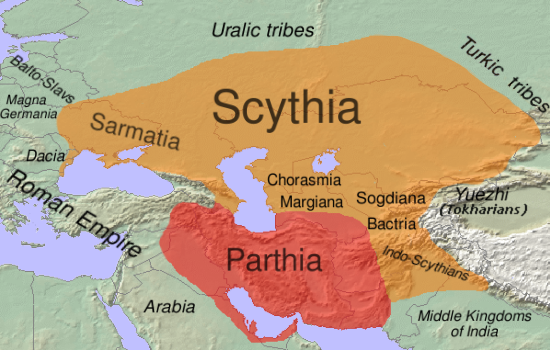
- The invasion was to begin in Dacia then continue to Parthia. According to Plutarch, Scythia was to be Caesar's next target.
- Operational scope: Dacia, Middle East and Central Asia
- Planned: for 44 BC
- Planned by: Roman Republic under Julius Caesar
- Target: Burebista's Dacian kingdom, Parthian Empire, various other states and peoples
- Executed by: Planned: 16 legions (c. 60,000 men); 10,000 cavalry; Unknown number of auxiliary cavalry and light infantry
- Outcome: Eventual cancellation and diversion of Roman forces among civil war parties

Julius Caesar's planned invasion of the Parthian Empire was to begin in 44 BC, with the aim to conquer Dacia, much of the Middle East as well as Central Asia for the Roman Republic. The Roman dictator's assassination that year prevented the invasion from taking place.

Following his victory in the Civil War against Pompey and his followers in 45 BC, Julius Caesar's authority was uncontested in the Roman Republic. His next plan was to launch an invasion of the Parthian Empire, the other great power of the period, which had, like the Republic, vastly expanded over the previous two centuries. Caesar sought to avenge the disaster of Carrhae in 53 BC, when the Parthians soundly defeated an invading army led by Crassus. The campaign was to start with the pacification of Dacia, followed by an invasion of the Parthian Empire. However, the invasion was cancelled with the murder of Julius Caesar on 15 March 44 BC. In 36 BC, Mark Antony, Caesar's former lieutenant, likewise attempted to conquer the Parthian Empire.

Plutarch also claims that once Parthia had been subdued, the army was to continue to Scythia, then Germania and finally back to Rome. Those grander plans are found only in Plutarch's Parallel Lives, and their authenticity is questioned by most scholars.

== Background and motivation for invasion ==
By the 40s BC, recent hostilities between the Roman Republic and the Parthian Empire dated to Marcus Licinius Crassus's campaign in 53 BC which ended in a crushing Roman defeat in the Battle of Carrhae. Afterward, occasional clashes in border regions continued, though Parthian raids into Syria and Cilicia were largely repelled by the Romans. Parthia subsequently took Pompey's side in the civil war against Caesar. (Note: Parthia was aware of the political divide in Rome and that Caesar's victory in the civil war could lead to invasion.) In 45 BC, Caesar emerged victorious in the civil war, and turned his attention east for his next campaign.

The public excuse for the expedition was the need to avenge the failed invasion attempt by Crassus, even though it dated back ten years at this point. To many Romans, this defeat still required revenge. (Note: According to Dio, the Roman people's desire for that revenge led to Caesar being given sole command of the Parthian campaign by a unanimous vote.) As the Roman Republic in 45 BC was still politically divided after the civil war, Marcus Cicero tried to lobby Caesar to postpone the Parthian invasion and to solve domestic problems instead. Following a similar line of thought in June that year, Caesar temporarily wavered in his intention to leave with the expedition. However, Caesar finally decided to leave Rome and to join the army in Macedonia.

A number of motivations have been proposed to explain Caesar's decision to continue his military career. After a victorious campaign he would have, as Plutarch wrote, "completed this circuit of his empire, which would then be bounded on all sides by the ocean" and effectively achieved world domination as the Romans understood it. Furthermore, he would have returned home with his lifelong dictatorship secured. It has also been proposed that Caesar knew of the threats against him and felt that leaving Rome and being in the company of a loyal army would be safer both personally and politically. Caesar may have also wished to heal the rift from the civil war or to distract from it by reminding the populace of Rome of the threat of a neighbouring empire.

Historian Nic Fields argued that Caesar's plan was a "grandiose campaign" backed by "breathtaking self-assurance", with the dictator seemingly being more inspired by his own comparatively limited military experience with eastern enemies than the reality on the ground. Even though the Parthians had completely crushed Crassus' legions, Caesar may have still seen the Parthian Empire in the context of the "myth of eastern degeneracy" which had been reinforced by his easy victory over the Kingdom of Pontus in 47 BC.

== Preparation and invasion plans ==
There is evidence that Caesar had begun practical preparation for the campaign some time before late 45 BC. By 44 BC Caesar had begun a mass mobilization, sixteen legions (c.60,000 men) and 10,000 cavalry were being gathered for the invasion. These would be supported by auxiliary cavalry and light armed infantry. In 46 and 45, two supporters of Caesar, Titus Carisius and Lucius Valerius Acisculus, also struck denarii with eastern symbols, such as Sol and the sphinx, which may allude to the planned campaign.

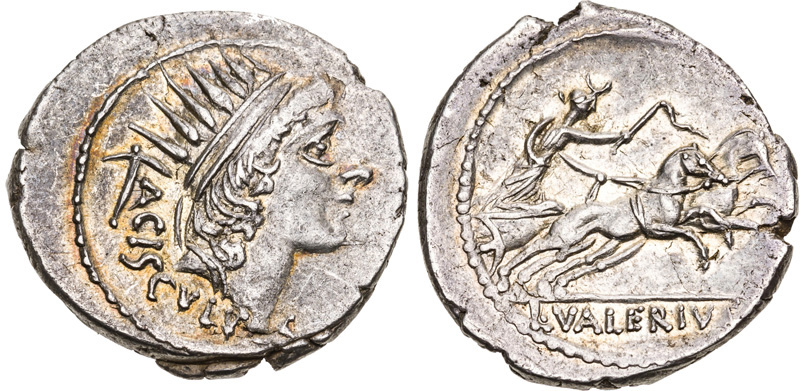
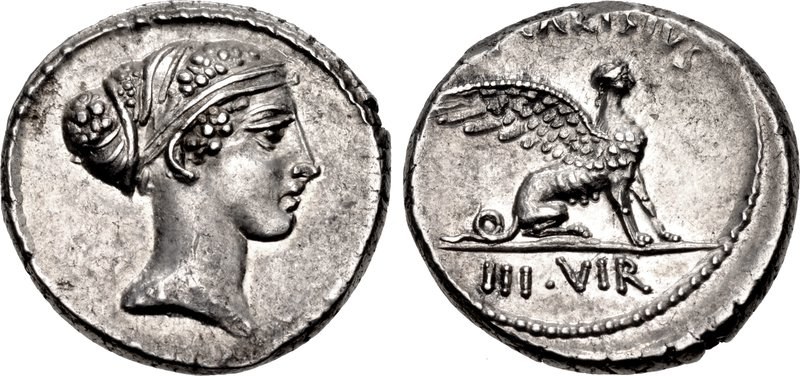
Denarii minted by Carisius in 46 BC (top) and Valerius Acisculus in 45 BC (bottom). The use of Sol and the sphinx may allude to the planned Parthian campaign.

Six of the legions had already been sent to Macedonia to train, along with a large sum of gold for the expedition. Octavius was sent to Apollonia (within modern Albania), ostensibly as a student, to remain in contact with the army. As Caesar planned to be away for some time, he reordered the senate and ensured that all magistrates, consuls and tribunes would be appointed by him during his absence. Caesar intended to leave Rome to start the campaign on 18 March; however, three days prior to his departure he was assassinated.

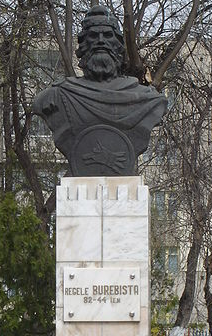
King Burebista of Dacia was the initial target of Caesar's plans.

The expedition was planned to take three years. It was to begin with a punitive attack on Dacia under King Burebista, who had been threatening Macedonia's northern border. It has been suggested by Christopher Pelling that Dacia, not Parthia, was going to be the expedition's main target.

After Dacia the army was then to invade Parthia from Armenia. (Note: Caesar's invasion plan used more cavalry than Marcus Licinius Crassus's and approached through the friendly territory of Armenia. It is believed that both factors would have improved his chances of success relative to the earlier attempt by Crassus.) (Note: From 46 BC Quintus Caecilius Bassus had control of Syria. Bassus had supported Pompey in the civil war, had murdered Caesar's cousin, Sextus Caesar, and defeated the new governor sent by Caesar.) The ancient sources diverge. Suetonius states that Caesar wished to proceed cautiously and would not fully engage the Parthian army unless he had determined their full strength. Although he implies that Caesar's goal was an expansion of the empire, not just its stabilization, Plutarch describes a bolder campaign by writing that once Parthia had been subdued, the army would move through the Caucasus, attack Scythia and return to Italy after it had conquered Germania. Plutarch also states that the construction of a canal through the isthmus of Corinth for which Anienus had been placed in charge, was to occur during the campaign. (Note: Nicolaus of Damascus also mentions an intention to continue to India after Parthia.)

=== Plutarch's reliability ===
Plutarch's Parallel Lives was written with the intention of finding correlations between the lives of famous Romans and Greeks; for example, Caesar was paired with Alexander the Great. Buszard's reading of Parallel Lives also interprets Plutarch as trying to use Caesar's future plans as a case study in the error of unbridled ambition.

Some academics have theorised that Caesar's pairing with Alexander and Trajan's invasion of Parthia, which was around the time of Plutarch's writing, led to exaggerations in the presented invasion plan. The deployment of the army to Macedonia near the Dacian frontier and the lack of military preparation in Syria have also been used to lend support for that hypothesis. Malitz acknowledges that the Scythia and Germania plans appear to be unrealistic but believes that they were credible with the geographic knowledge of the time.

== Aftermath ==
In order to support a royal title for Caesar, a rumour was spread before the planned invasion. It alleged that it had been prophesied that only a Roman king could defeat Parthia. As Caesar's greatest internal opposition came from those that believed he wanted royal power, that strengthened the conspiracy against him.

It has also been proposed that Caesar's opposition would be fearful of him returning victorious from his campaign since he would be more popular than ever.

The assassination occurred on 15 March 44 BC on the day that the senate was to debate granting Caesar the title of king for the war with Parthia. However, some of the aspects of Caesar's planned kingship may have been invented after the assassination to justify the act. The relationship between the planned Parthian war and his death, if any, is unknown.

After Caesar's death, Mark Antony successfully vied for control of the legions from the planned invasion, which were still stationed in Macedonia, and he temporarily took control of that province to do so. From 40 to 33 BC, Rome and particularly Antony would wage an unsuccessful war against Parthia. He used Caesar's proposed invasion plan, of attacking through Armenia, where it was felt that the support of the local king could be relied on.

In Dacia, Burebista died the same year as Caesar, which led to the dissolution of his kingdom.

== Sources ==
=== Ancient ===
- Appian, The Civil Wars
- Cassius Dio, Roman History
- Nicolaus of Damascus, Life of Augustus
- Plutarch, Parallel Lives.
- Suetonius, The Twelve Caesars.

=== Modern ===
- Crawford, Michael (1974). Roman Republican Coinage. Cambridge University Press.
- Fields, Nic (2022). Carrhae 53 BC: Rome's Disaster in the Desert. Oxford: Osprey Publishing. ISBN 978-1472849045.
- Heitland, W. E. (2013). A Short History of the Roman Republic. Cambridge University Press. pp. 469–471. ISBN 9781107621039.
- Malitz, Jürgen (1984). "Caesars Partherkrieg (English title: Caesar's Parthian War)" (PDF). Historia: Zeitschrift für Alte Geschichte. Bd. 33, H. 1: 21–59.
- Townend, G. B. (1983). "A Clue to Caesar's unfulfilled Intentions". Latomus. 42 (3): 601–606. JSTOR 41532893.
- Woods, David (2013). "Carisius, Acisculus, and the Riddle of the Sphinx". American Journal of Numismatics (1989-). 25: 243–257. JSTOR 43580630.
