= Tanusius Geminus =

Roman historian

Tanusius Geminus was an ancient Roman historian from the 1st century BCE. Very little is known of him and none of his work survives. The German classical scholar Friedrich Münzer believed he was a senator. This perspective has been criticized by American classicist Erich Gruen for lacking supporting evidence.

He wrote a historical treatise describing the Catiline Conspiracy. The historian Suetonius utilized Geminus as a source on the Catiline Conspiracy in his work The Twelve Caesars. Geminus is thought to have been politically hostile to Julius Caesar. It has been argued that because Suetonius's work is critical of Caesar, which implies his sources, including Geminus, were also opposed to Caesar. The historian Plutarch also utilized Geminus as a source for one of Cato the Younger's speeches. According to Plutarch, Geminus recorded that Cato considered the campaigns of Caesar in Germany to be unjustified. Plutarch claims that Geminus wrote that the Romans should turn Caesar over to the Germans following these battles. Geminus may also have been a source for Appian. It has been argued that Plutarch and Appian describe the event in such a similar manner that they likely share a common source, potentially Geminus.

Seneca referred to him in his epistles. He wrote:

There are books which contain very few lines, admirable and useful in spite of their size; and there are also the Annals of Tanusius – you know how bulky the book is, and what men say of it. This is the case with the long life of certain persons, – a state which resembles the Annals of Tanusius!

It has been argued that the poet Catullus may also have referenced him in his writings. He described an annalist's works as cacata charta, which can be translated as "toilet paper." Although Catullus calls this writer Volusius, the historian George Lincoln Hendrickson argues that this may have been a snide reference to Geminus due to the subpar quality associated with both author's works. The British scholar D. R. Shackleton Bailey argues that "it can hardly be doubted" that the "state which resembles the Annals of Tanusius" described in Seneca alludes to the "cacata" ("shit") state of the writings of Tanusius described by Catullus. Nevertheless, the American scholar Elmer Truesdell Merrill is critical of this theory, arguing that it has no supporting evidence beyond the remark from Seneca and conjecture.

== See also ==
- Tanusia gens
