= Tiridates II of Parthia =

King of the Parthian Empire, c. 30–26 BC

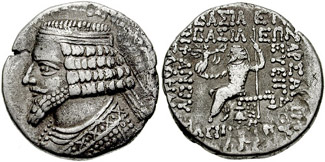
Coin of Tiridates II. Rev.: King seated, holding sceptre and Victory; legend BACIΛEΩΣ BAΣIΛEΩN - APΣAKOΥ EΥEPΓETOΥ - ΔIKAIOΥ - EΠΙΦANOΥΣ ΦIΛEΛΛHNOΣ.

Tiridates II of Parthia was set up by the Parthians against Phraates IV in about 32 BC, but was expelled when Phraates returned with the help of the Scythians. Tiridates fled to Syria, where Augustus allowed him to stay, but refused to support him.

During the next years Tiridates invaded Parthia again; some coins dated from March and May, 26 BC, with the name of a king "Arsaces Philoromaios," belong to him; on the reverse, they show the king seated on the throne, with Tyche stretching out a palm branch towards him. He was soon expelled again and brought a son of Phraates into Spain to Augustus. Augustus gave the boy back to his father, but declined to surrender "the fugitive slave Tiridates."
