= Phraates V =

King of Kings of the Parthian Empire from 2 BC to 4 AD

- Great King, King of Kings, Arsaces
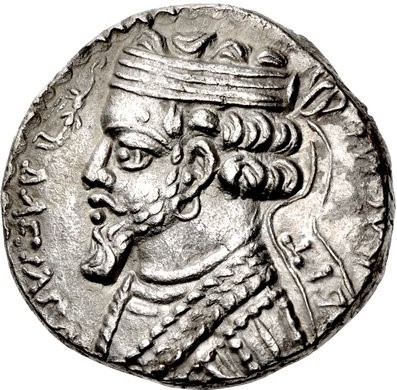
- Coin of Phraates V minted at Seleucia

King of the Parthian Empire
- Reign: 2 BC – 4 AD
- Predecessor: Phraates IV
- Successor: Orodes III
- Co-ruler: Musa (2 BC – 4 AD)
- Born: c. 19 BC
- Died: 1st-century AD
- Father: Phraates IV
- Mother: Musa
- Religion: Zoroastrianism

Phraates V (Parthian: 𐭐𐭓𐭇𐭕 Frahāt), also known by the diminutive version of his name, Phraataces (also spelled Phraatakes), was the King of Kings of the Parthian Empire from 2 BC to 4 AD. He was the younger son of Phraates IV (r. 37 BC – 2 BC) and Musa, who ruled with him.

Under Phraates V, a war threatened to break out between the Parthian and Roman empires over the control of Armenia and Mesopotamia. Although Augustus (r. 27 BC – 14 AD) had sent his adopted son Gaius Caesar to invade Iran, in 1 AD the two sides agreed a peace treaty, by which once again Armenia was recognized as being in the Roman sphere. Phraates V was in return acknowledged as the rightful Parthian king, which was of high importance to him, due to his insecure position in the country. In 4 AD, Phraates V and his mother fled to Rome after being expelled by the Parthian nobility, who crowned Orodes III as king.

== Name ==
Phraátēs (Φραάτης) is the Greek form of the Parthian Frahāt (𐭐𐭓𐭇𐭕), itself from the Old Iranian *Frahāta- ("gained, earned"). The Modern Persian version is Farhād (فرهاد). Phraates V was regularly known by the diminutive version of his name, Phraataces (فرهادک), meaning "the small Phraates".

== Background ==
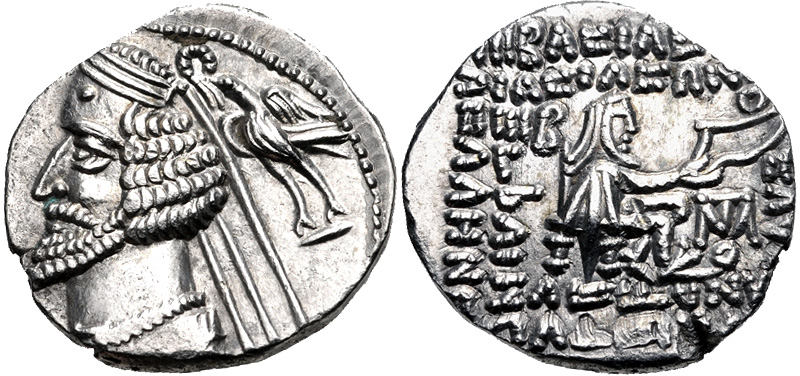
Coin of Phraates V's father, Phraates IV (r. 37–2 BC)

Phraates V was the son of the Phraates IV (r. 37–2 BC) and his Roman wife Musa, who was originally an Italian slave-girl given to him by the Roman emperor Augustus (r. 27 BC – 14 AD) after a treaty in 20 BC in which the Romans returned Phraates IV his kidnapped son in return for the lost legionary standards taken at Carrhae in 53 BC, as well as any surviving prisoners of war. The Parthians viewed this exchange as a small price to pay to regain the prince. Musa quickly became queen and a favourite of Phraates IV, giving birth to Phraataces (Phraates V) in c. 19 BC. It was reportedly under her influence, that Phraates IV in 10/9 BC sent his four first-born sons to Rome in order to prevent conflict over his succession. In 2 BC, Musa had Phraates IV poisoned and made herself, along with Phraates V, the co-rulers of the Parthian empire. According to the 1st-century Roman historian Josephus, he heard a rumour that Musa enjoyed sexual relations with her son. This and the coinage of Musa with Phraates V, led to some scholars believe that the two had married. However, there is no evidence that supports this claim; neither under the Parthians, nor their Persian predecessors—the Achaemenids—is there reliable evidence that marriage was practised between parents and their children.

== Reign ==
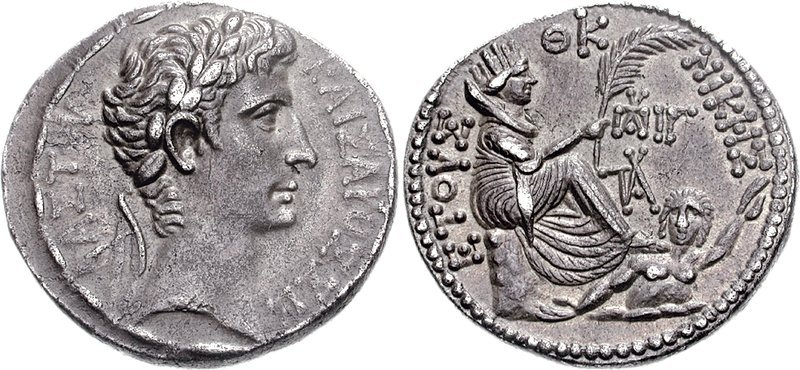
Coin of the Roman emperor Augustus

At his accession, Phraates V inherited a long dispute between the Parthians and the Romans over Armenia and Mesopotamia. As a result, Augustus dispatched an army under his adopted son Gaius Caesar to capture both regions. Before war broke out, they were met by an emissary of Phraates V, who demanded the king's brothers be returned to him. Augustus wrote a mocking response in a letter to Phraates V, which simply addressed him as "Phraates". He demanded that Phraates relinquish his crown and give up his claims to Armenia. Not intimidated, Phraates V replied back—according to the classical Roman historian Cassius Dio—"in a generally haughty tone, styling himself King of Kings and addressing Augustus simply as Caesar".

Ultimately, the two powers agreed to come to terms through diplomacy: a peace-treaty was agreed in 1 AD, which made Armenia a Roman vassal state, whilst the Romans agreed to acknowledge the Parthian Empire as its equal, and Phraates V as its rightful ruler. It was important to Phraates V that he was acknowledged by the Romans, due to his insecure domestic position in the country. However, this strategy backfired. In 4 AD, the Parthian nobility, already discontented with the son of an Italian slave-girl occupying the throne, were further angered by his acknowledgement of Roman suzerainty in Armenia, expelling Phraates V and Musa from the Parthian throne. Both fled to Rome, where Augustus welcomed them. The Parthian nobility then placed Orodes III on the throne.

== Coinage ==
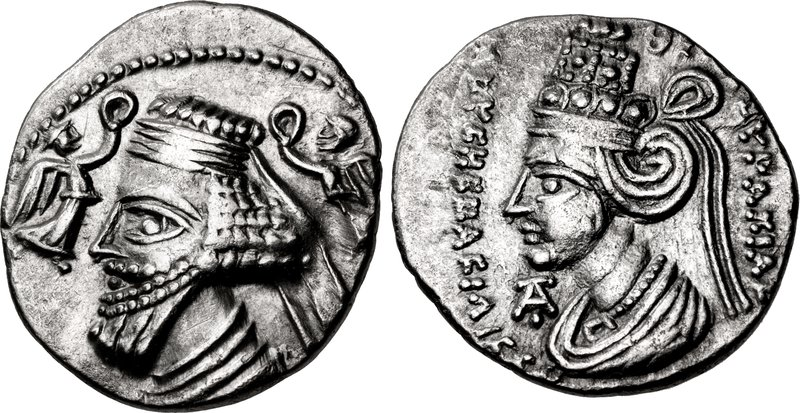
Coin of Phraates V with his mother Musa, minted at Ecbatana

Phraates V's later reverse coins notably have an image of his mother, Musa, with a circular legend labelling her as "heavenly", contrary to the square legends which had been typical on Parthian coin mints. Furthermore, the title of basilissa ("queen") is also given to her, which was not necessarily only used by the wife of the king in the Hellenistic era, but also other royal women. Like his father, Phraates V's obverse coins depicts a figure resembling the Greek goddess Nike holding a ring and diadem behind his head. In the Parthian era, Iranians used Hellenistic iconography to portray their divine figures, thus the figure can be associated with the Avestan khvarenah, i.e. kingly glory. Rarely, a fire temple is depicted on the reverse of his coins. Likewise, the title of Phraates V on his coinage remained the same as that of his father: "[coin] of the King of Kings, Arsakes, Just, Benefactor, Illustrious, Philhellene."

== Sources ==
- Bigwood, J. M. (2004). "Queen Mousa, Mother and Wife(?) of King Phraatakes of Parthia: A Re-evaluation of the Evidence". Journal of the Classical Association of Canada. 4 (1). Project Muse: 35–70. doi:10.1353/mou.2004.0027. S2CID 164436127.
- Boyce, Mary (1984). Zoroastrians: Their Religious Beliefs and Practices. Psychology Press. pp. 1–252. ISBN 9780415239028.
- Bivar, A.D.H. (1983). "The Political History of Iran Under the Arsacids". In Yarshater, Ehsan (ed.). The Cambridge History of Iran: The Seleucid, Parthian and Sasanian Periods. Vol. 3(1). Cambridge: Cambridge University Press. pp. 21–99. ISBN 0-521-20092-X.
- Curtis, Vesta Sarkhosh (2012). "Parthian coins: Kingship and Divine Glory". The Parthian Empire and its Religions. Computus Druck Satz & Verlag. pp. 67–83. ISBN 9783940598134.
- Dąbrowa, Edward (2012). "The Arsacid Empire". In Daryaee, Touraj (ed.). The Oxford Handbook of Iranian History. Oxford University Press. pp. 1–432. ISBN 978-0-19-987575-7.
- Garthwaite, Gene Ralph (2005), The Persians, Oxford & Carlton: Blackwell Publishing, Ltd., ISBN 978-1-55786-860-2
- Kia, Mehrdad (2016). The Persian Empire: A Historical Encyclopedia [2 volumes]. ABC-CLIO. ISBN 978-1610693912.
- Marciak, Michał (2017). Sophene, Gordyene, and Adiabene: Three Regna Minora of Northern Mesopotamia Between East and West. BRILL. ISBN 9789004350724.
- Olbrycht, Marek Jan (2016). "The Sacral Kingship of the early Arsacids I. Fire Cult and Kingly Glory". Anabasis: Studia Classica et Orientalia. 7: 91–106.
- Rezakhani, Khodadad (2013). "Arsacid, Elymaean, and Persid Coinage". In Potts, Daniel T. (ed.). The Oxford Handbook of Ancient Iran. Oxford University Press. ISBN 978-0199733309.
- Richardson, J.S. (2012). Augustan Rome 44 BC to AD 14: The Restoration of the Republic and the Establishment of the Empire. Edinburgh University Press. ISBN 978-0-7486-1954-2.
- Schippmann, K. (1986). "Arsacids ii. The Arsacid dynasty". Encyclopaedia Iranica, Vol. II, Fasc. 5. pp. 525–536.
- Schmitt, Rüdiger (2005). "Personal Names, Iranian iv. Parthian Period". Encyclopaedia Iranica.
- Strugnell, Emma (2006), "Ventidius' Parthian War: Rome's Forgotten Eastern Triumph", Acta Antiqua, 46 (3): 239–252, doi:10.1556/AAnt.46.2006.3.3
- Strugnell, Emma (2008). "Thea Musa, Roman Queen of Parthia". Iranica Antiqua. 43: 275–298. doi:10.2143/IA.43.0.2024051.

Phraates V Arsacid dynasty
Preceded by Phraates IV	King of the Parthian Empire; 2 BC–4 AD; Joint ruler with Musa	Succeeded by Orodes III
