= Behistun inscription =

Ancient multilingual stone inscription in Iran

Bisotun
UNESCO World Heritage Site
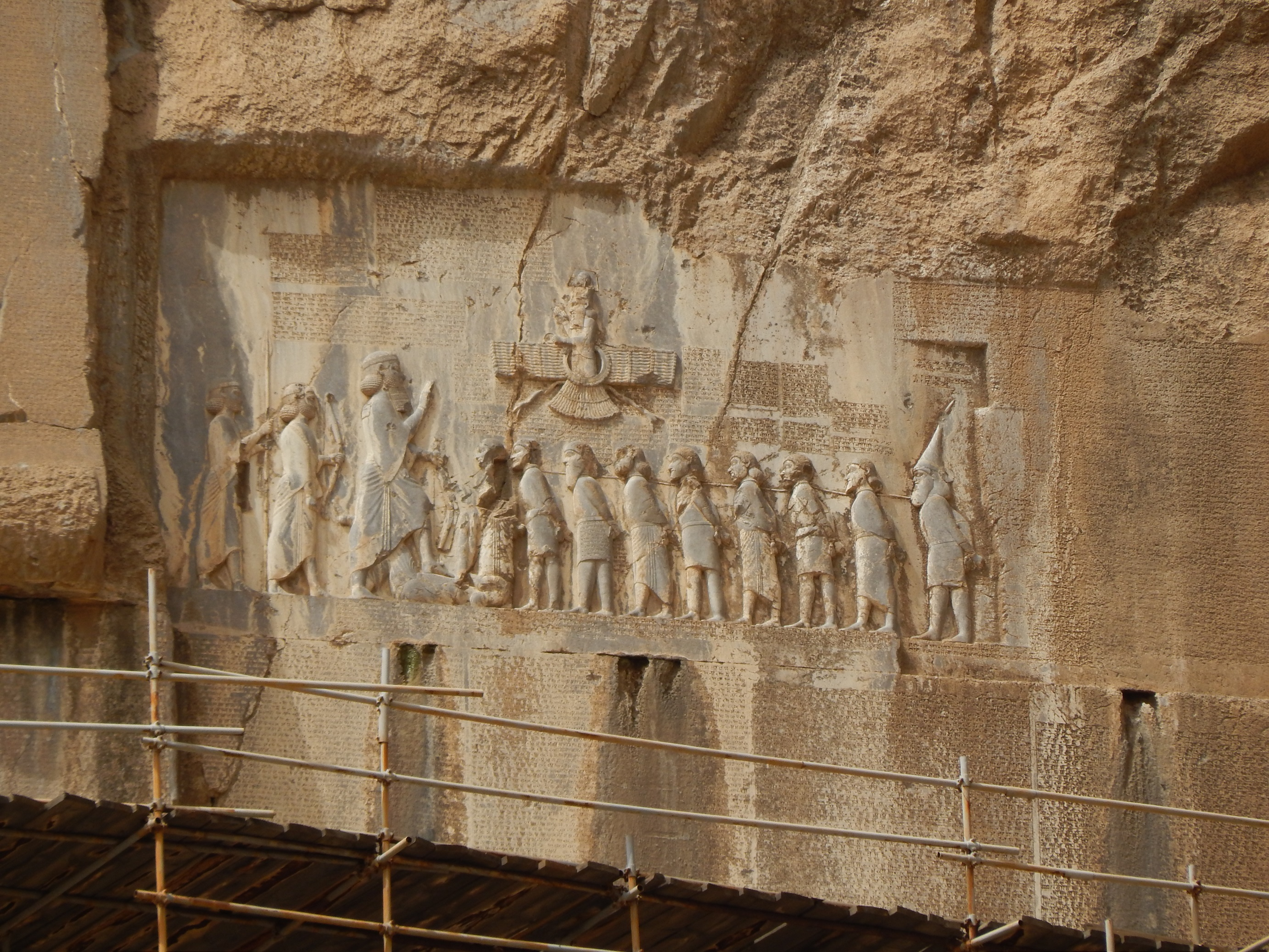
- Punishment of captured impostors and conspirators: Gaumāta lies under the boot of Darius the Great. The last person in line, wearing a traditional Scythian hat and costume, is identified as Skunkha. His image was added after the inscription was completed, requiring some of the text be removed.

- Location within Iran
- Location: Mount Behistun, Kermanshah Province, Iran
- Criteria: Cultural: ii, iii
- Reference: 1222
- Inscription: 2006 (30th Session)
- Area: 187 ha (460 acres)
- Buffer zone: 361 ha (890 acres)
- Coordinates: 34°23′26″N 47°26′9″E

Iran National Heritage List
- Official name: Behistun Inscriptions
- Type: Cuneiform Inscriptions
- Designated: 1932
- Reference no.: 70
- Conservation organization: Cultural Heritage, Handicrafts and Tourism Organization of Iran

The Behistun inscription (also Bisotun, Bisitun or Bisutun; Persian: بیستون, Old Persian: Bagastana, meaning "the place of god") is a multilingual Achaemenid royal inscription and large rock relief on a cliff at Mount Behistun in the Kermanshah Province of Iran, near the city of Kermanshah in western Iran, established by Darius the Great (r. 522–486 BC). It was important to the decipherment of cuneiform, as it is the longest known trilingual cuneiform inscription, written in Old Persian, Elamite, and Babylonian (a variety of Akkadian).

Authored by Darius the Great sometime between his coronation as king of the Achaemenid Empire in the summer of 522 BC and his death in autumn of 486 BC, the inscription begins with a brief autobiography of Darius, including his ancestry and lineage. Later in the inscription, Darius provides a lengthy sequence of events following the death of Cambyses II in which he fought nineteen battles in a period of one year (ending in December 521 BC) to put down multiple rebellions throughout the Persian Empire. The inscription states in detail that the rebellions were orchestrated by several impostors and their co-conspirators in various cities throughout the empire, each of whom falsely proclaimed himself king during the upheaval following Cambyses II's death. Darius the Great proclaimed himself victorious in all battles during the period of upheaval, attributing his success to the "grace of Ahura Mazda".

The inscription is approximately 15 m (49 ft) high by 25 m (82 ft) wide and 100 m (330 ft) up a limestone cliff from an ancient road connecting the capitals of Babylonia and Media (Babylon and Ecbatana, respectively). The Old Persian text contains 414 lines in five columns; the Elamite text includes 260 lines in eight columns, and the Babylonian text is in 112 lines. A copy of the text in Aramaic, written during the reign of Darius II, was found in Egypt. The inscription was illustrated by a life-sized bas-relief of Darius the Great, holding a bow as a sign of kingship, with his left foot on the chest of a figure lying supine before him. The supine figure is reputed to be the pretender Gaumata. Darius is attended to the left by two servants, and nine one-meter figures stand to the right, with hands tied and rope around their necks, representing conquered peoples. A Faravahar floats above, giving its blessing to the king. One figure appears to have been added after the others were completed, as was Darius's beard, which is a separate block of stone attached with iron pins and lead.

== Name ==
The name Behistun is derived from usage in Ancient Greek and Arabic sources, particularly Diodorus Siculus and Ya'qubi, transliterated into English in the 19th century by Henry Rawlinson. The modern Persian name is Bisotun.

== History ==
Darius at Behistun

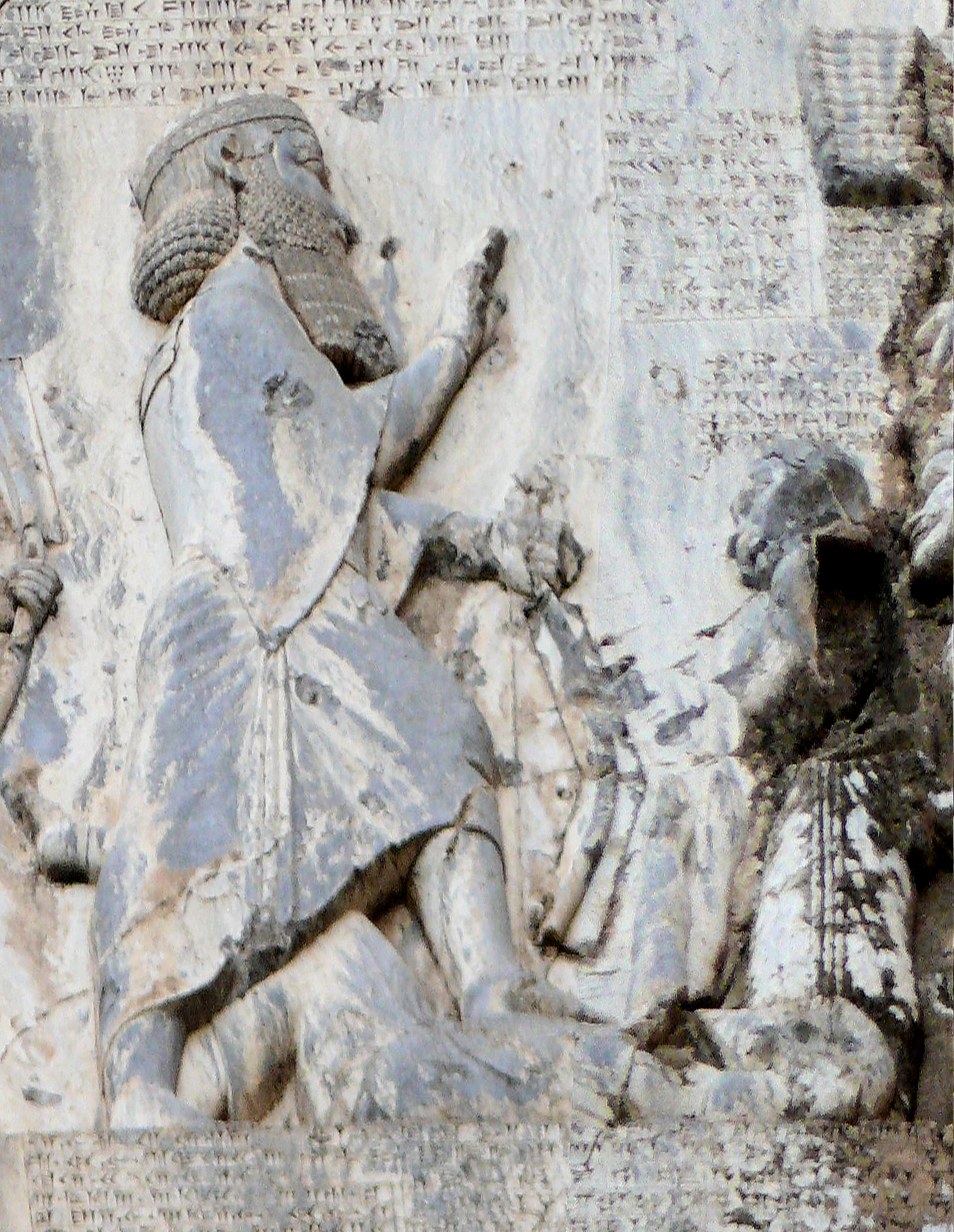
Full figure of Darius trampling rival Gaumata.

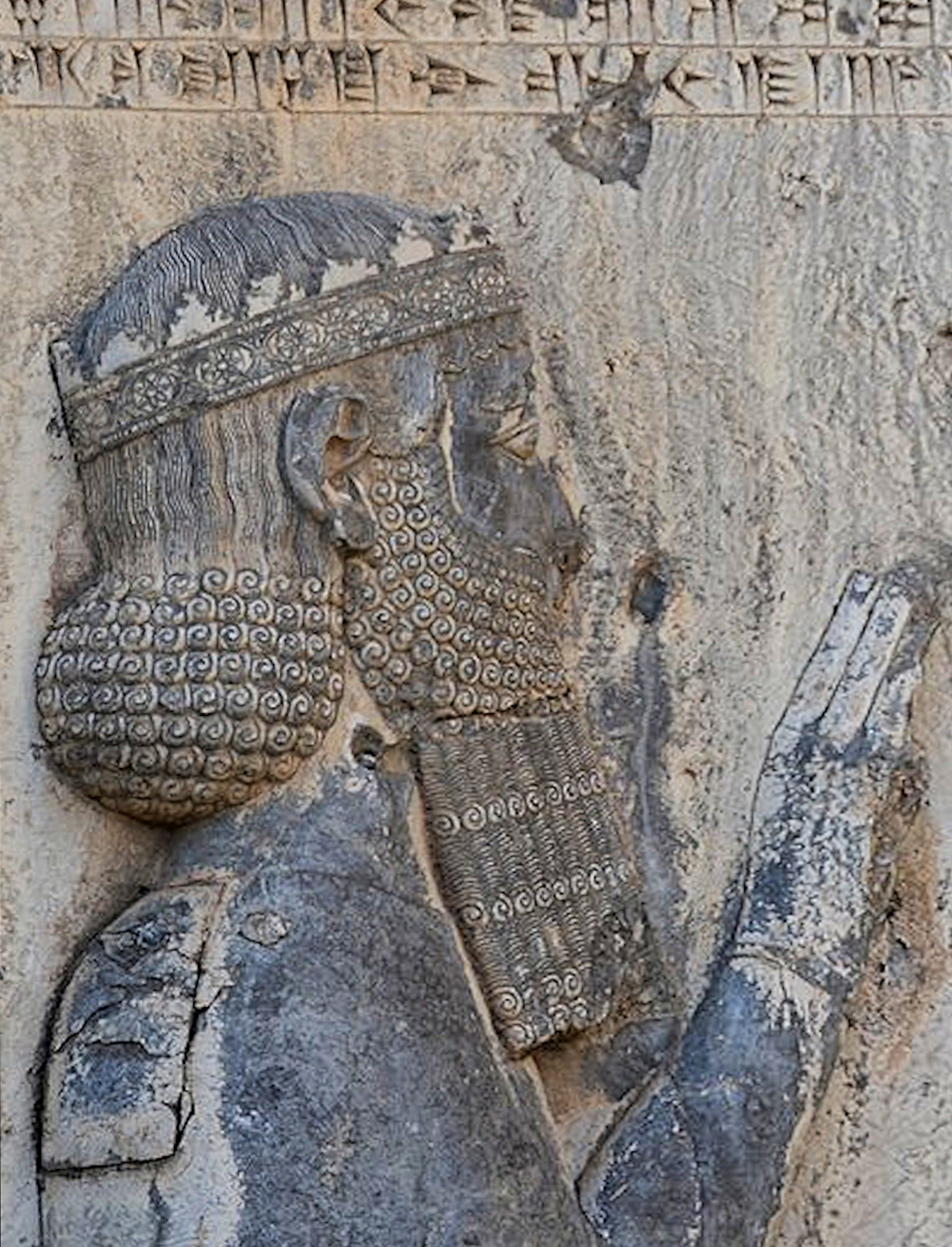
Head of Darius with crenellated crown

After the fall of the Persian Empire's Achaemenid dynasty and its successors, and the lapse of Old Persian cuneiform writing into disuse, the nature of the inscription was forgotten, and fanciful explanations became the norm.

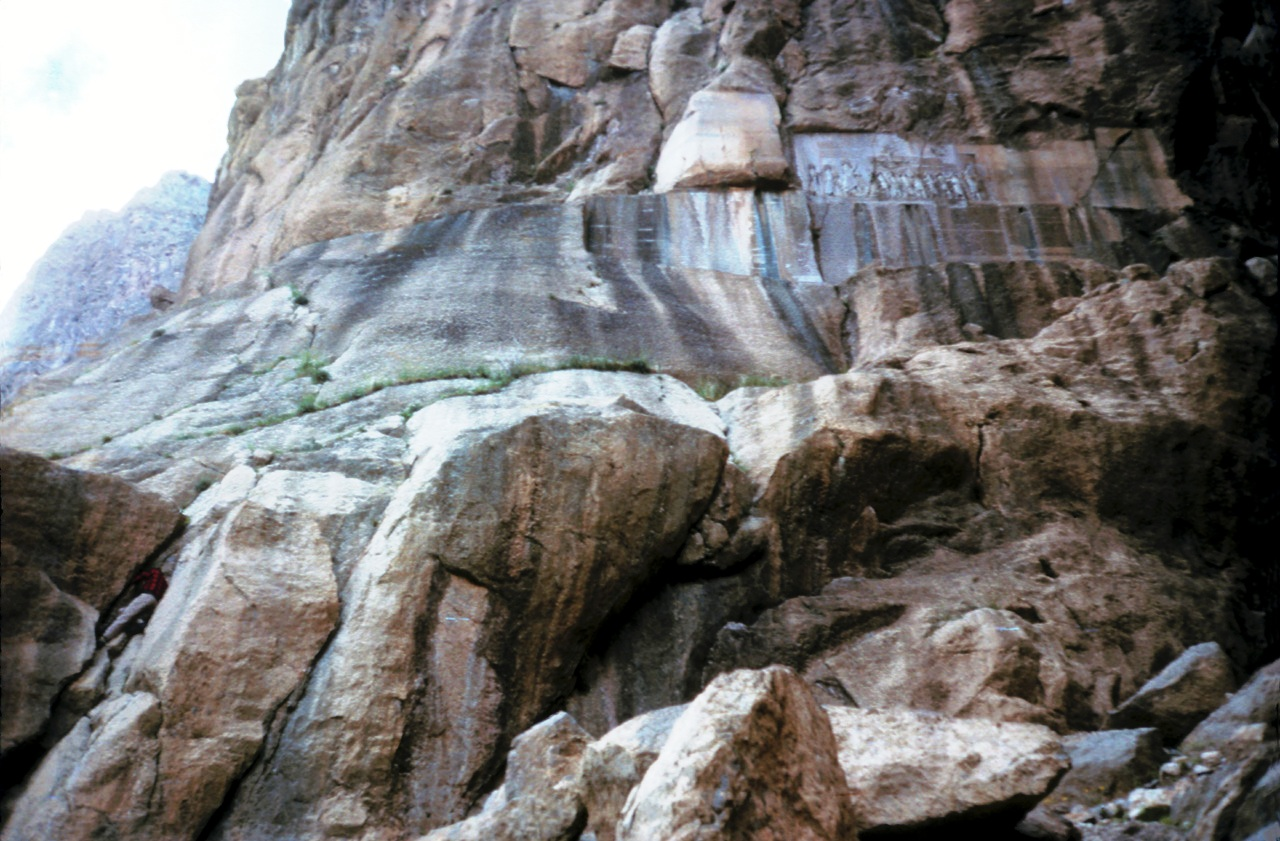
Route to inscription at upper right.

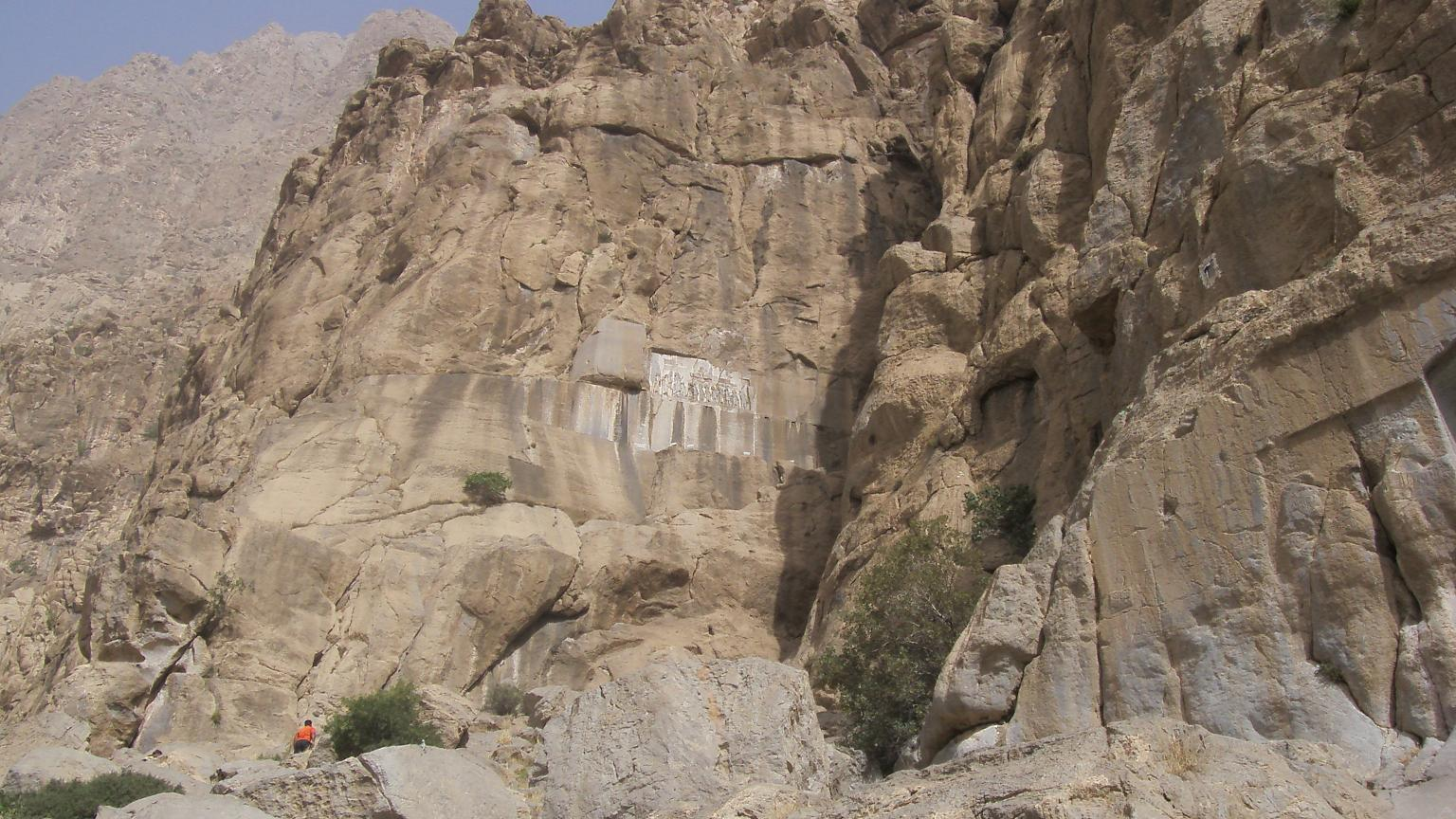
Context of the inscription (centre) in 2010. A person is visible in the lower left; reaching the inscription requires climbing the steep cliff face, then traversing a narrow ledge.

In 1598, Englishman Robert Sherley saw the inscription during a diplomatic mission to Safavid Persia on behalf of Austria, and brought it to the attention of Western European scholars. His party incorrectly came to the conclusion that it was Christian in origin. French General Gardanne thought it showed "Christ and his twelve apostles", and Sir Robert Ker Porter thought it represented the Lost Tribes of Israel and Shalmaneser of Assyria. In 1604, Italian explorer Pietro della Valle visited the inscription and made preliminary drawings of the monument.

== Translation efforts ==
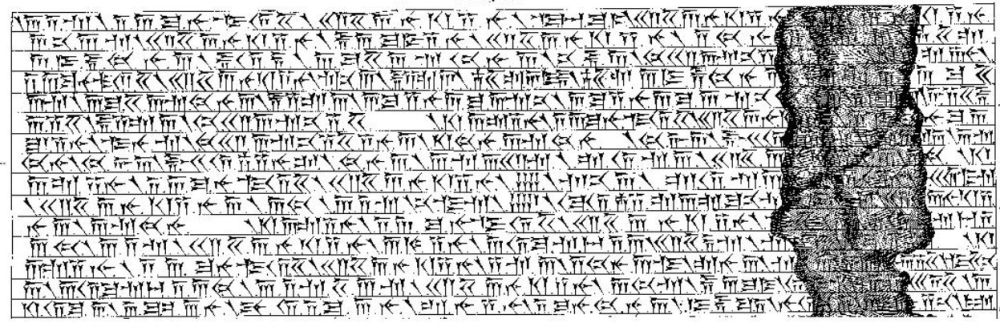
Column 1 (DB I 1–15), sketch by Friedrich von Spiegel (1881).

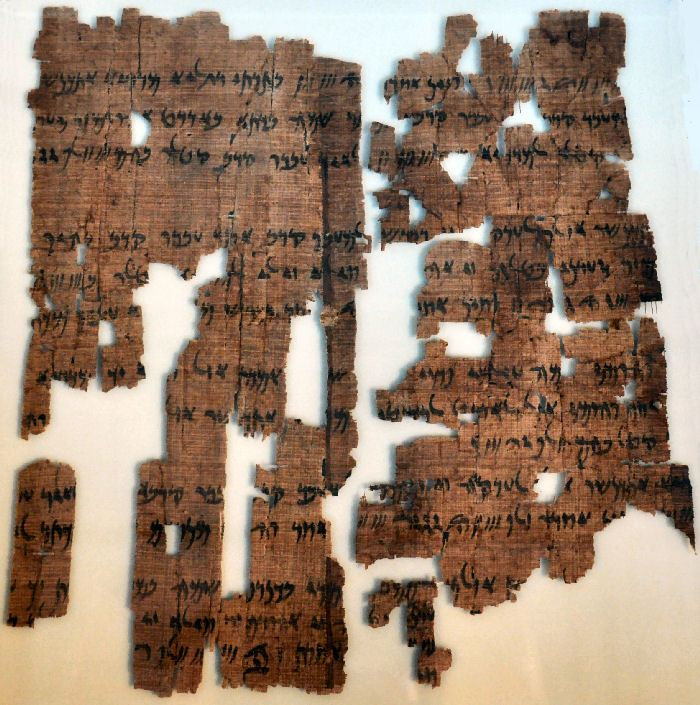
Behistun papyrus with an Aramaic translation of the Behistun inscription's text, known as TAD C2.1.

German surveyor Carsten Niebuhr visited around 1764 for Frederick V of Denmark, publishing a copy of the inscription in the account of his journeys in 1778. Niebuhr's transcriptions were used by Georg Friedrich Grotefend and others in their efforts to decipher the Old Persian cuneiform script. Grotefend had deciphered ten of the 37 symbols of Old Persian by 1802, after realizing that unlike the Semitic cuneiform scripts, Old Persian text is alphabetic and each word is separated by a vertical slanted symbol.

In 1835, Sir Henry Rawlinson, an officer of the British East India Company army assigned to the forces of the Shah of Iran, began studying the inscription in earnest. As the town of Bisotun's name was anglicized as "Behistun" at this time, the monument became known as the "Behistun Inscription". Despite its relative inaccessibility, Rawlinson was able to scale the cliff with the help of a local boy and copy the Old Persian inscription. The Elamite was across a chasm, and the Babylonian four meters above; both were beyond easy reach and were left for later. In 1847, he was able to send a full and accurate copy to Europe.

== Later research and activity ==
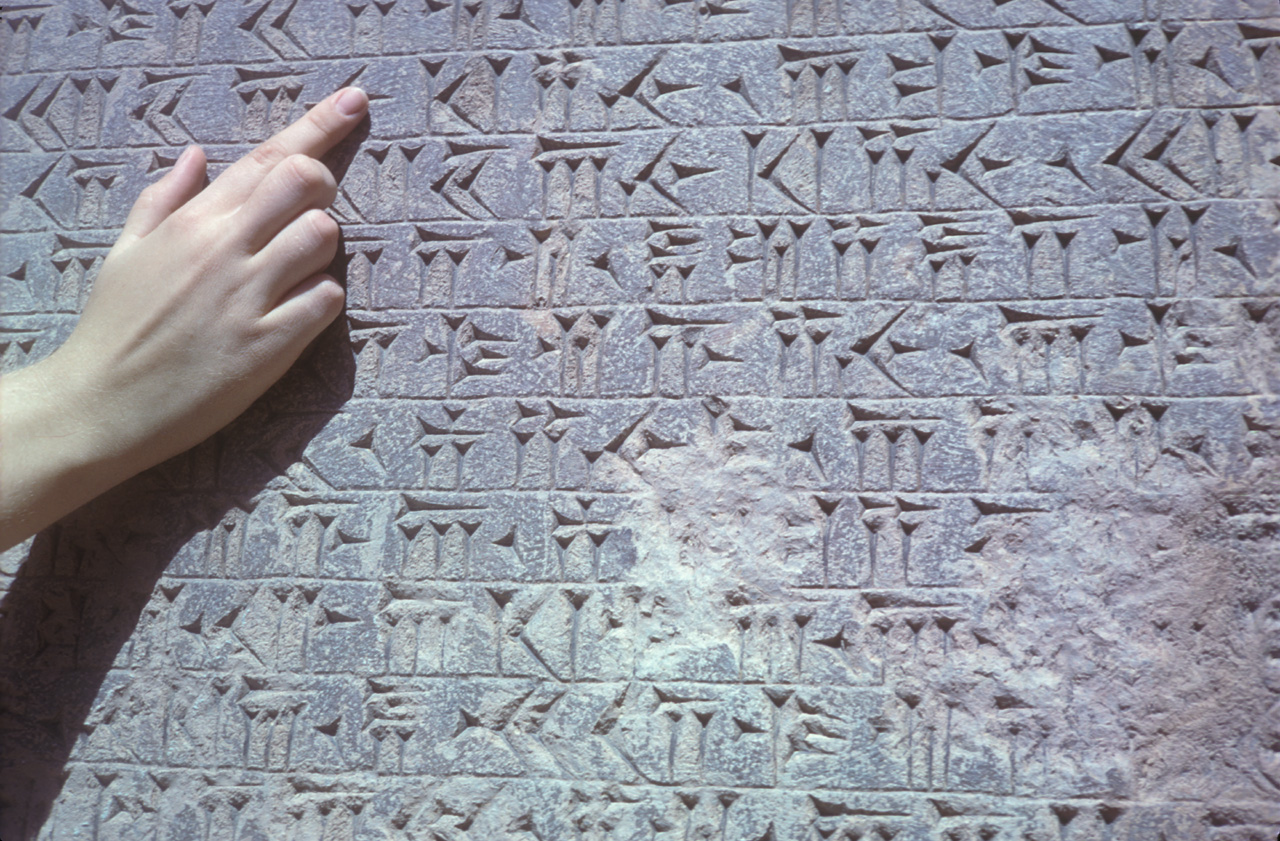
Close-up of the inscription.

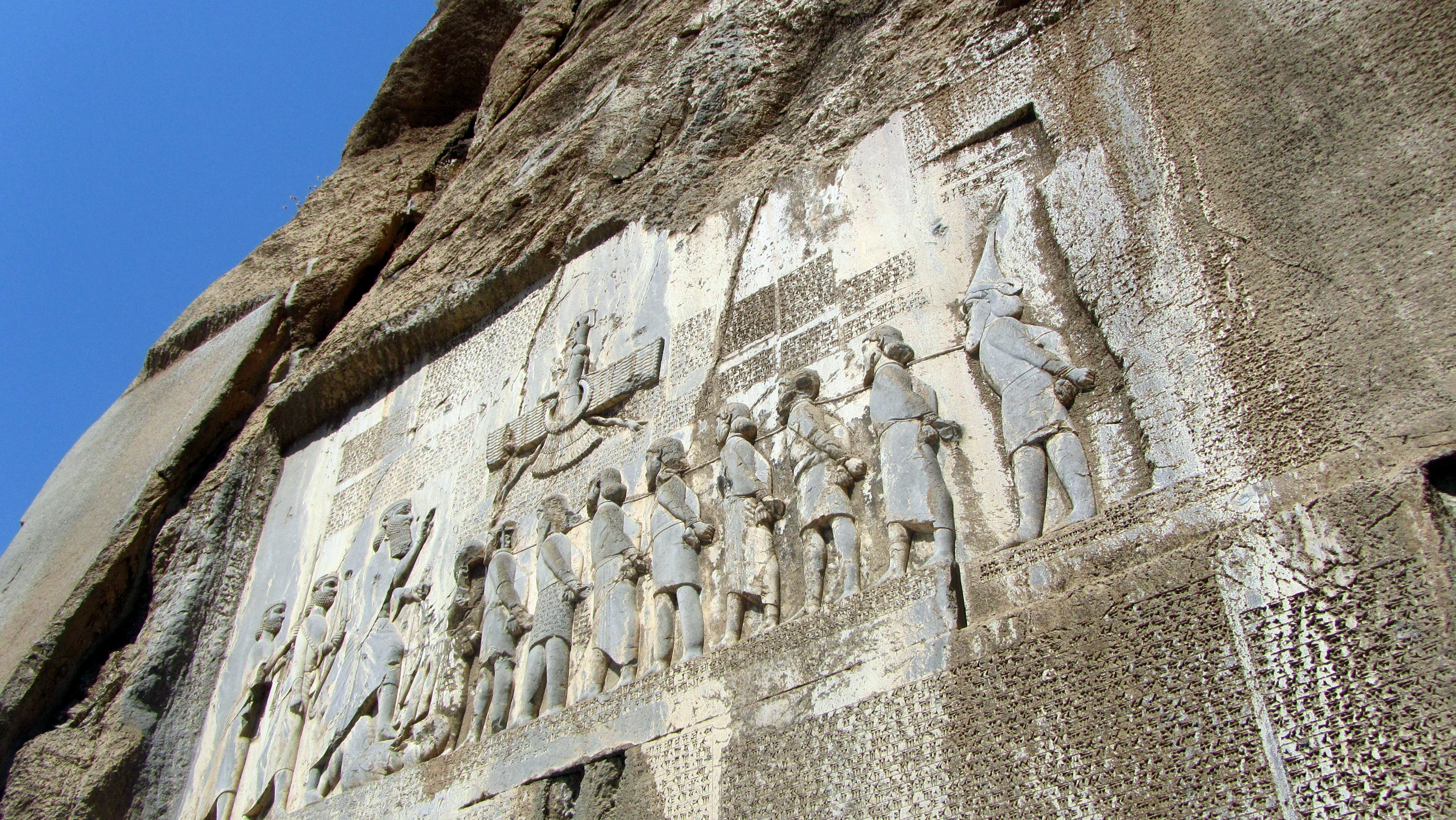
The Behistun inscription photographed in 2019

The site was visited by the American linguist A. V. Williams Jackson in 1903. Later expeditions, in 1904 sponsored by the British Museum and led by Leonard William King and Reginald Campbell Thompson and in 1948 by George G. Cameron of the University of Michigan, obtained photographs, casts and more accurate transcriptions of the texts, including passages that were not copied by Rawlinson. It also became apparent that rainwater had dissolved some areas of the limestone in which the text was inscribed, while leaving new deposits of limestone over other areas, covering the text.

In 1938, the inscription became of interest to the Nazi German think tank Ahnenerbe, although research plans were cancelled due to the onset of World War II.

The monument later suffered some damage from Allied soldiers using it for target practice in World War II, and during the Anglo-Soviet invasion of Iran.

In 1999, Iranian archeologists began the documentation and assessment of damages to the site incurred during the 20th century. Malieh Mehdiabadi, who was project manager for the effort, described a photogrammetric process by which two-dimensional photos were taken of the inscriptions using two cameras and later transmuted into 3D images.

In recent years, Iranian archaeologists have been undertaking conservation works. The site became a UNESCO World Heritage Site in 2006.

In 2012, the Bisotun Cultural Heritage Center organized an international effort to re-examine the inscription.

== Content ==
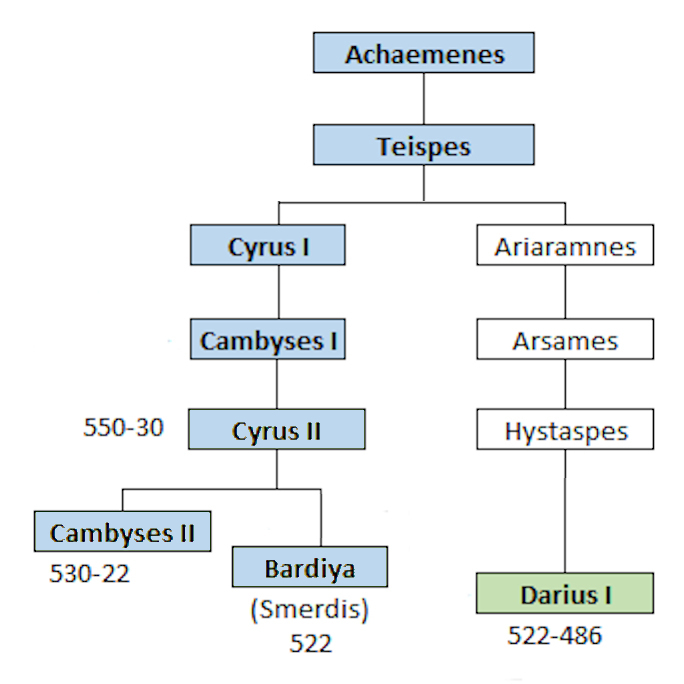
Lineage of Darius the Great according to the Behistun inscription.

=== Lineage ===
In the first section of the inscription, Darius the Great declares his ancestry and lineage:

King Darius says: My father is Hystaspes [Vištâspa]; the father of Hystaspes was Arsames [Aršâma]; the father of Arsames was Ariaramnes [Ariyâramna]; the father of Ariaramnes was Teispes [Cišpiš]; the father of Teispes was Achaemenes [Haxâmaniš].

King Darius says: That is why we are called Achaemenids; from antiquity we have been noble; from antiquity has our dynasty been royal. King Darius says: Eight of my dynasty were kings before me; I am the ninth. Nine in succession we have been kings.

King Darius says: By the grace of Ahuramazda am I king; Ahuramazda has granted me the kingdom.

=== Territories ===
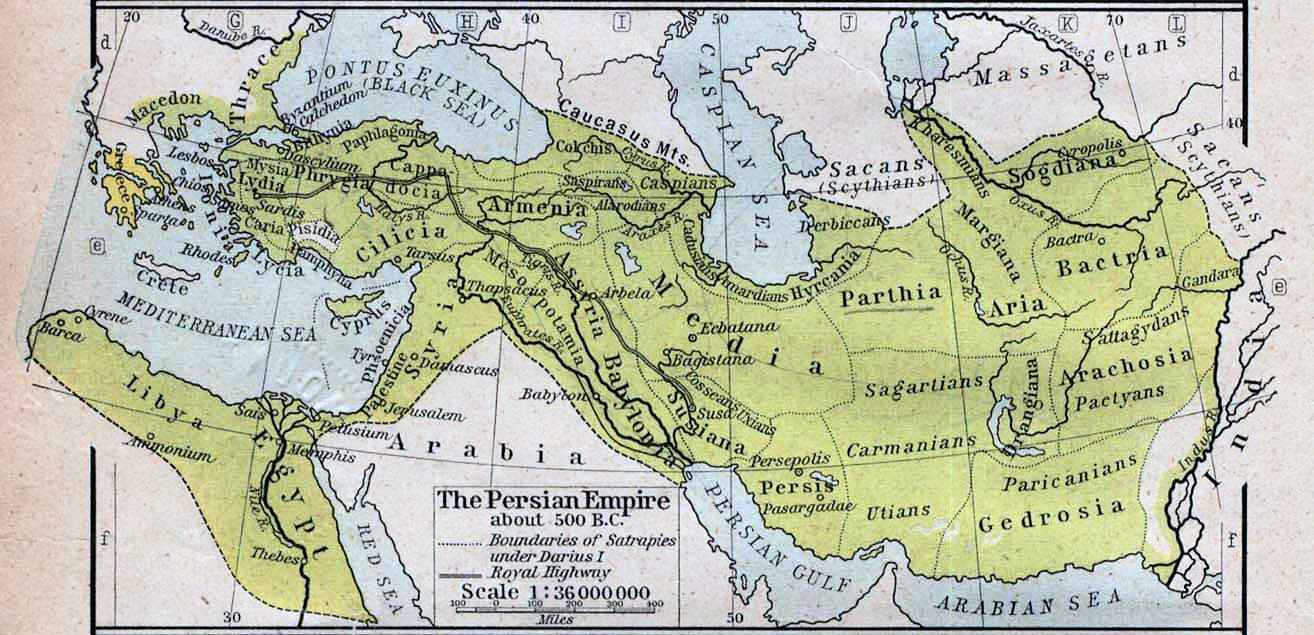
Achaemenid Empire at its greatest extent

Darius also lists the territories under his rule:

King Darius says: These are the countries which are subject unto me, and by the grace of Ahuramazda I became king of them: Persia [Pârsa], Elam [Ûvja], Babylonia [Bâbiruš], Assyria [Athurâ], Qedar [Arabâya], Egypt [Mudrâya], the countries by the Sea [Tyaiy Drayahyâ (Phoenicia)], Lydia [Sparda], the Greeks [Yauna (Ionia)], Media [Mâda], Armenia [Armina], Cappadocia [Katpatuka], Parthia [Parthava], Drangiana [Zraka], Aria [Haraiva], Chorasmia [Uvârazmîy], Bactria [Bâxtriš], Sogdia [Suguda], Gandhara [Gadâra], Scythia [Saka], Sattagydia [Thataguš], Arachosia [Harauvatiš] and Maka [Maka]; twenty-three lands in all.

=== Conflicts and revolts ===
Later in the inscription, Darius provides an eye-witness account of battles he successfully fought over a one-year period to put down rebellions which had resulted from the deaths of Cyrus the Great, and his son Cambyses II:

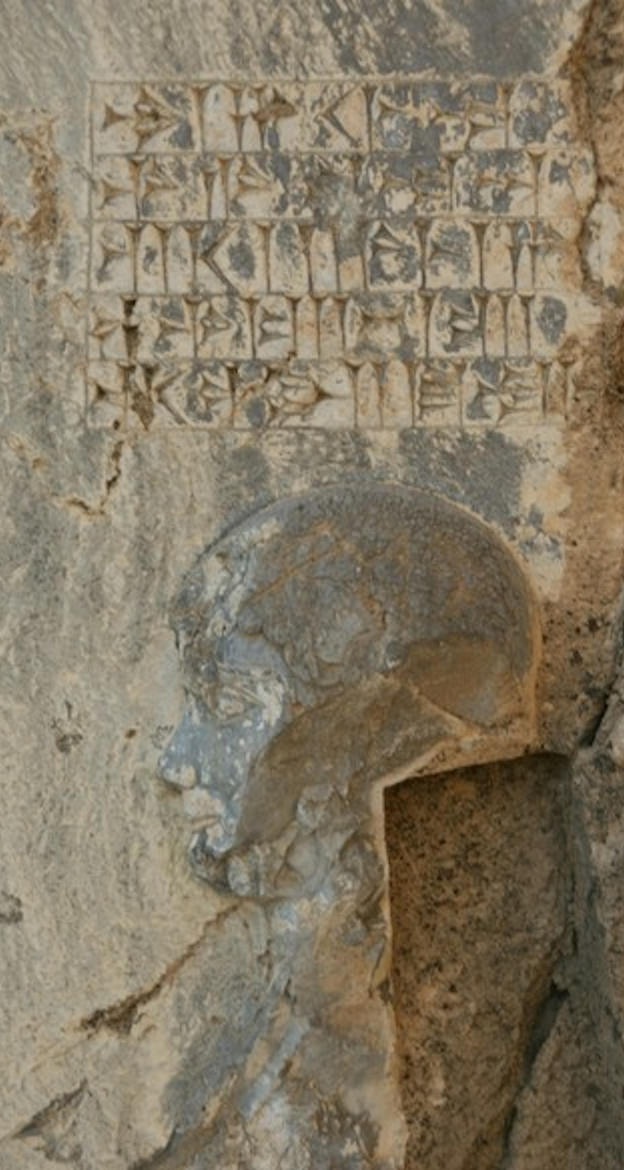
Relief of Âššina c. 519 BC: "This is Âššina. He lied, saying 'I am king of Elam.'"

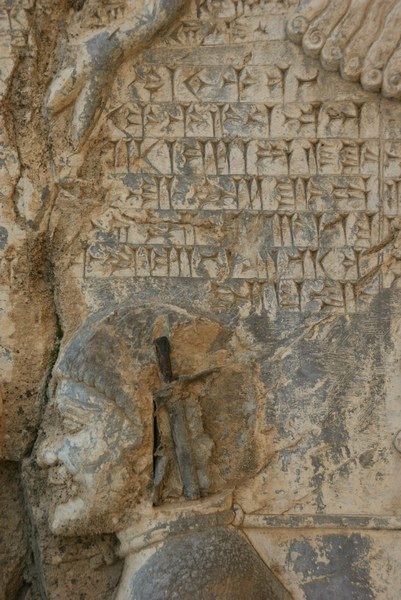
Relief of Nidintu-Bêl: "This is Nidintu-Bêl. He lied, saying 'I am Nebuchadnezzar, the son of Nabonidus. I am king of Babylon.'"

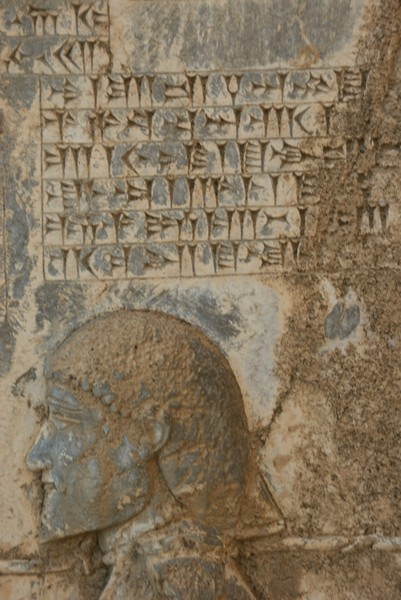
Relief of Tritantaechmes: "This is Tritantaechmes. He lied, saying 'I am king of Sagartia, from the family of Cyaxares.'"

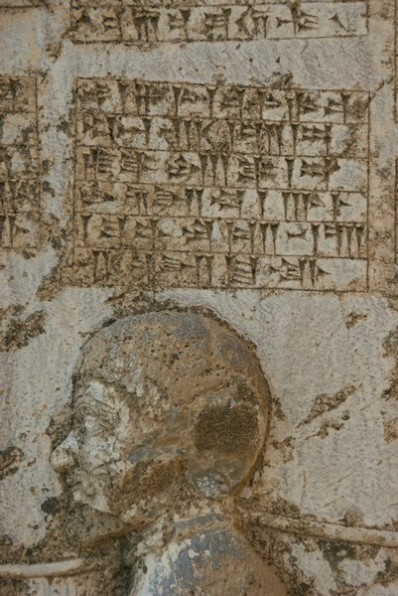
Relief of Arakha: "This is Arakha. He lied, saying: 'I am Nebuchadnezzar, the son of Nabonidus. I am king in Babylon.'"

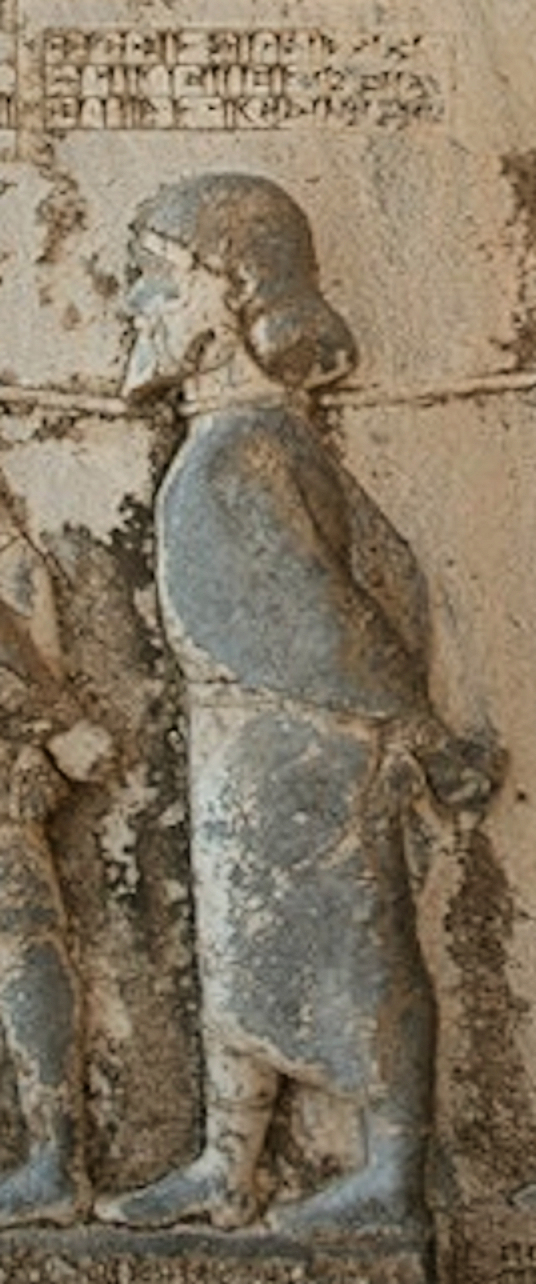
Relief of Frâda: "This is Frâda. He lied, saying 'I am king of Margiana.'"

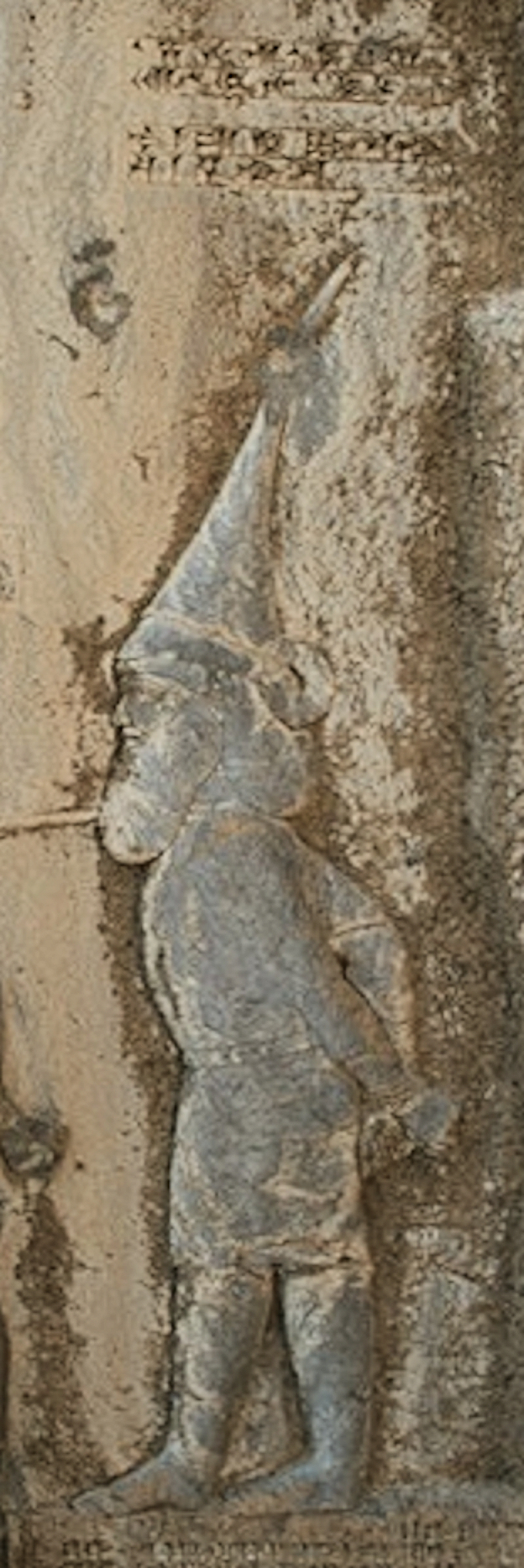
Behistun relief of Skunkha. Label: "This is Skunkha the Sacan."

== Other historical monuments in the Behistun complex ==
The site covers an area of 116 hectares. Archeological evidence indicates that this region became a human shelter 40,000 years ago. There are 18 historical monuments other than the inscription of Darius the Great in the Behistun complex that have been registered in the Iranian national list of historical sites. Some of them are:

- Hunters' cave
- Farhād Tarāsh
- Median fortress
- Parthian town
- Statue of Hercules in Behistun
- Parthian site of worship
- Behistun Palace (said to be Palace of Khosrau II)
- Ilkhanid caravanserai
- Median temple
- Bas relief of Mithridates II of Parthia
- Bas relief of Gotarzes II of Parthia
- Sheikh Ali khan Zangeneh text endowment
- Safavid caravanserai
- Vologases's relief
- Carved Sassanian stones
- Royal Road
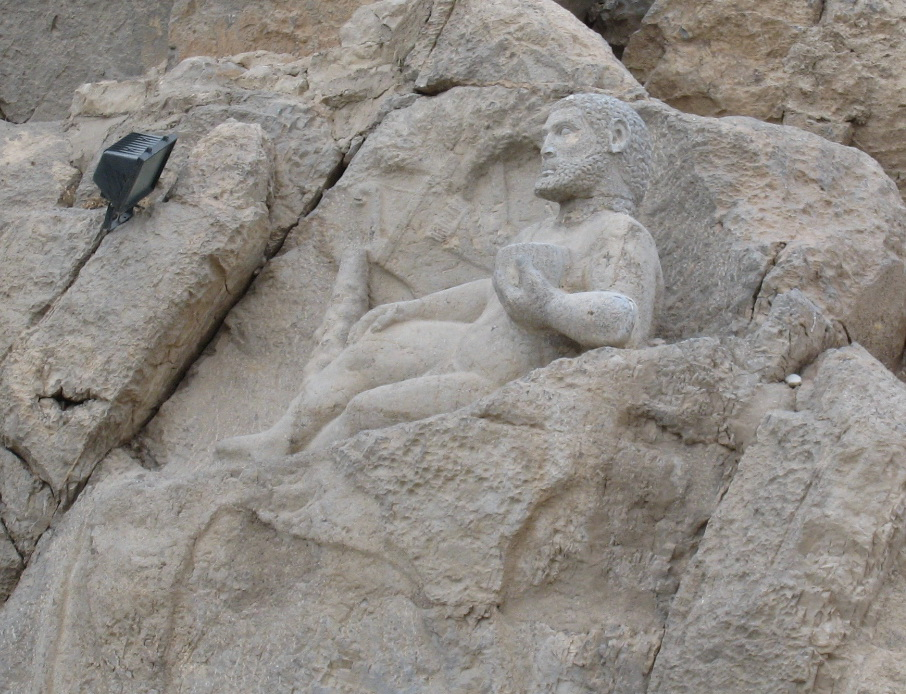
Statue of Herakles in Behistun complex

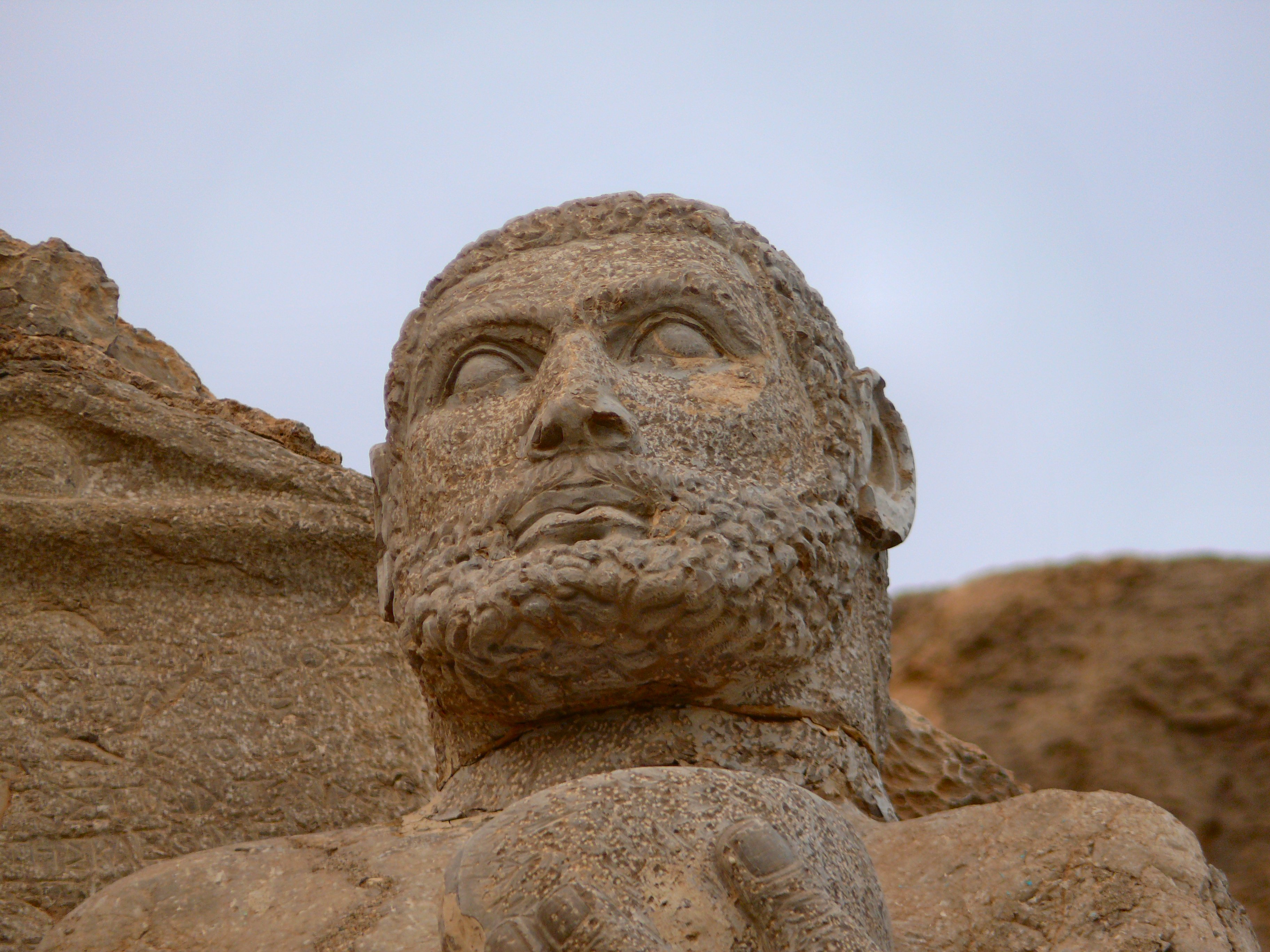
Herakles at Behistun, sculpted for a Seleucid governor in 148 BC

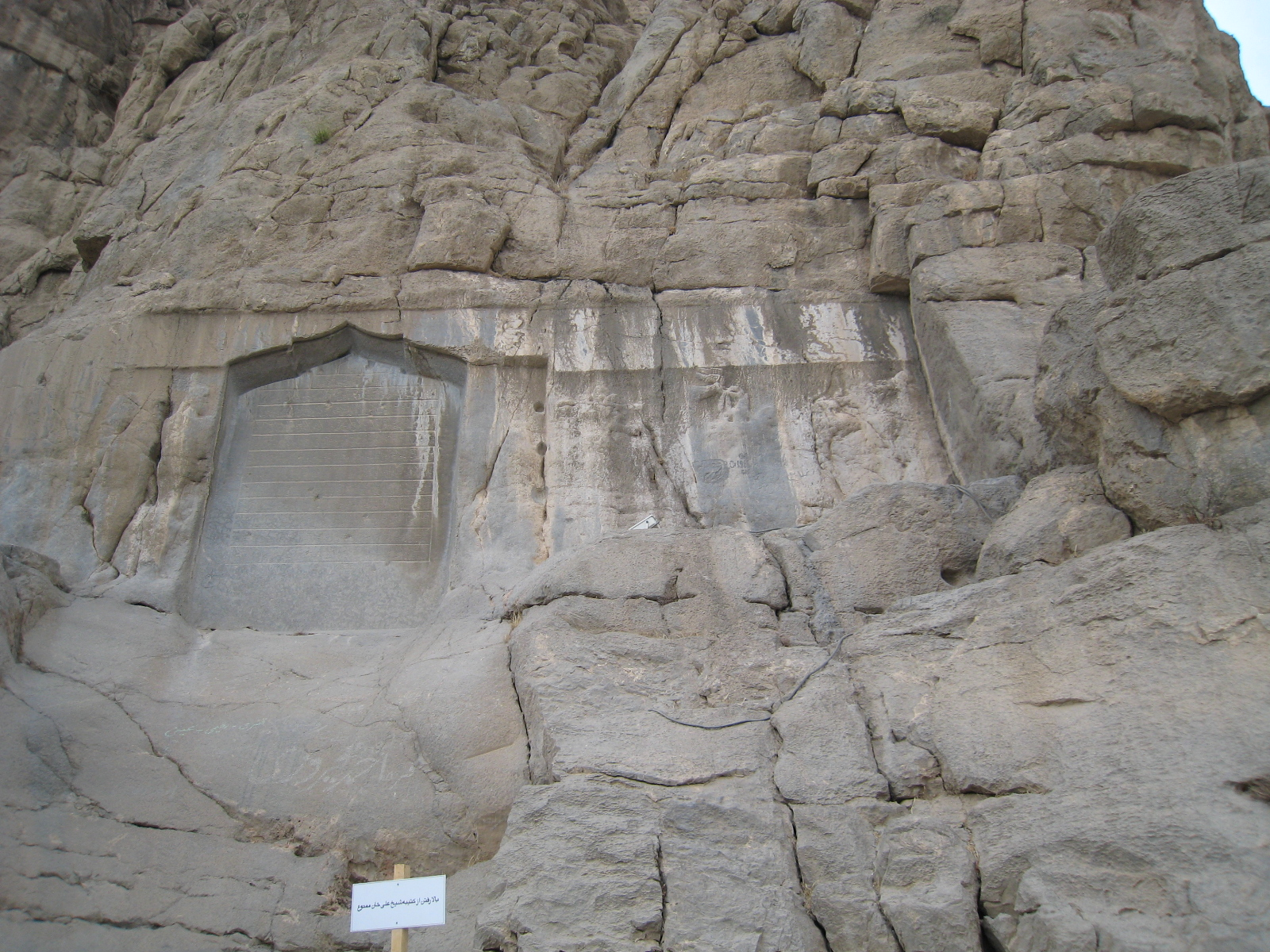
Bas relief of Mithridates II of Parthia and bas relief of Gotarzes II of Parthia and Sheikh Ali khan Zangeneh text endowment

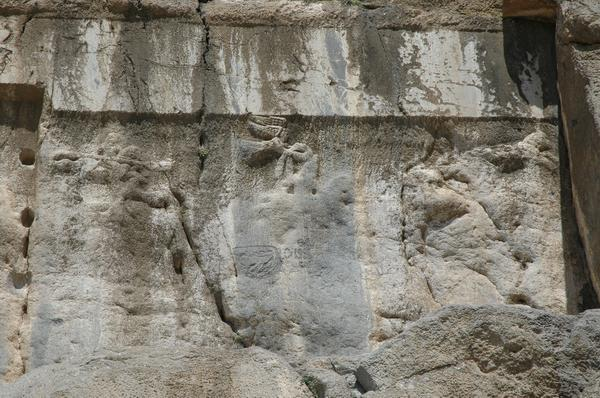
Damaged equestrian relief of Gotarzes II at Behistun

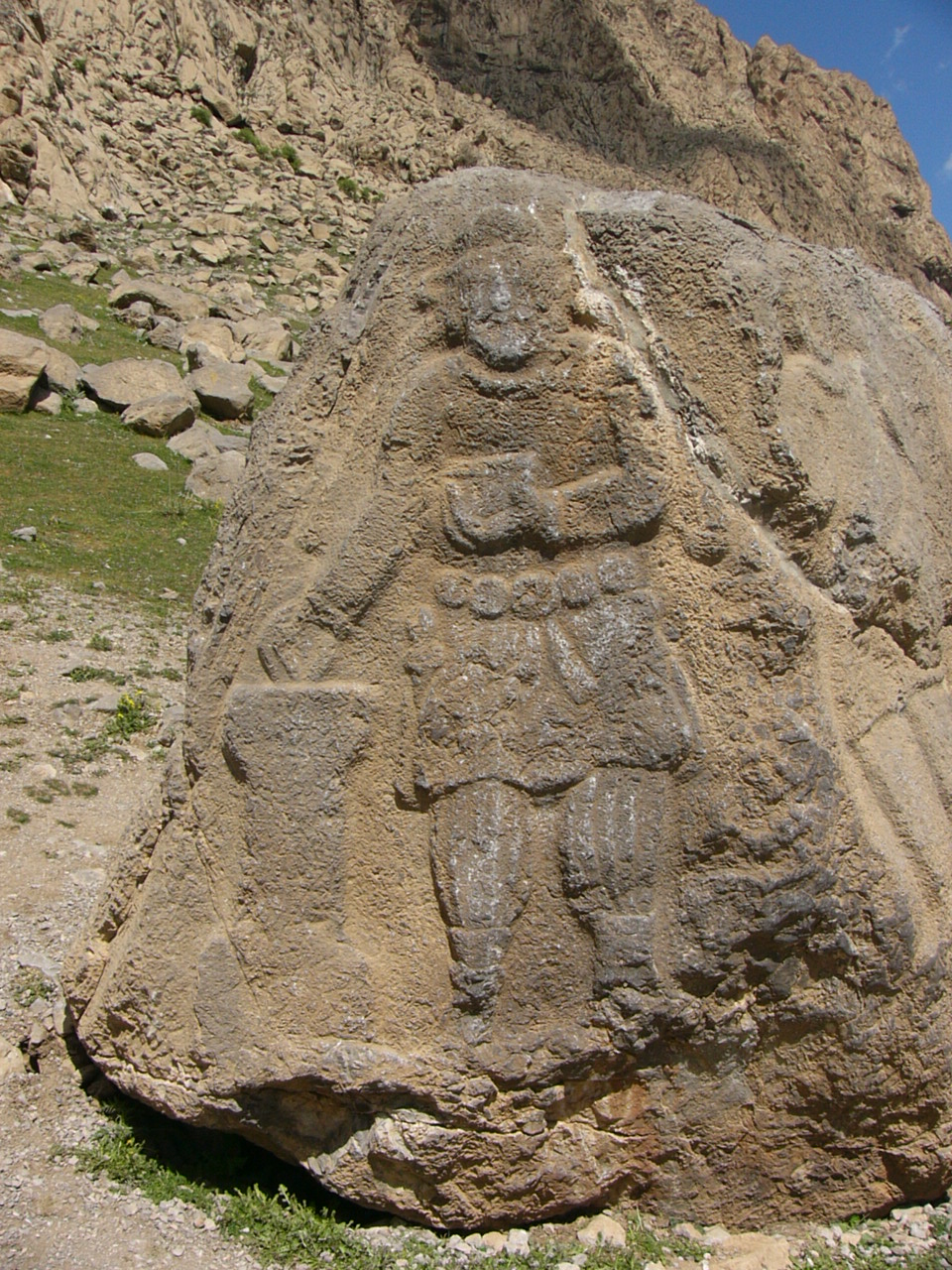
Vologases's relief in Behistun

== Similar reliefs and inspiration ==
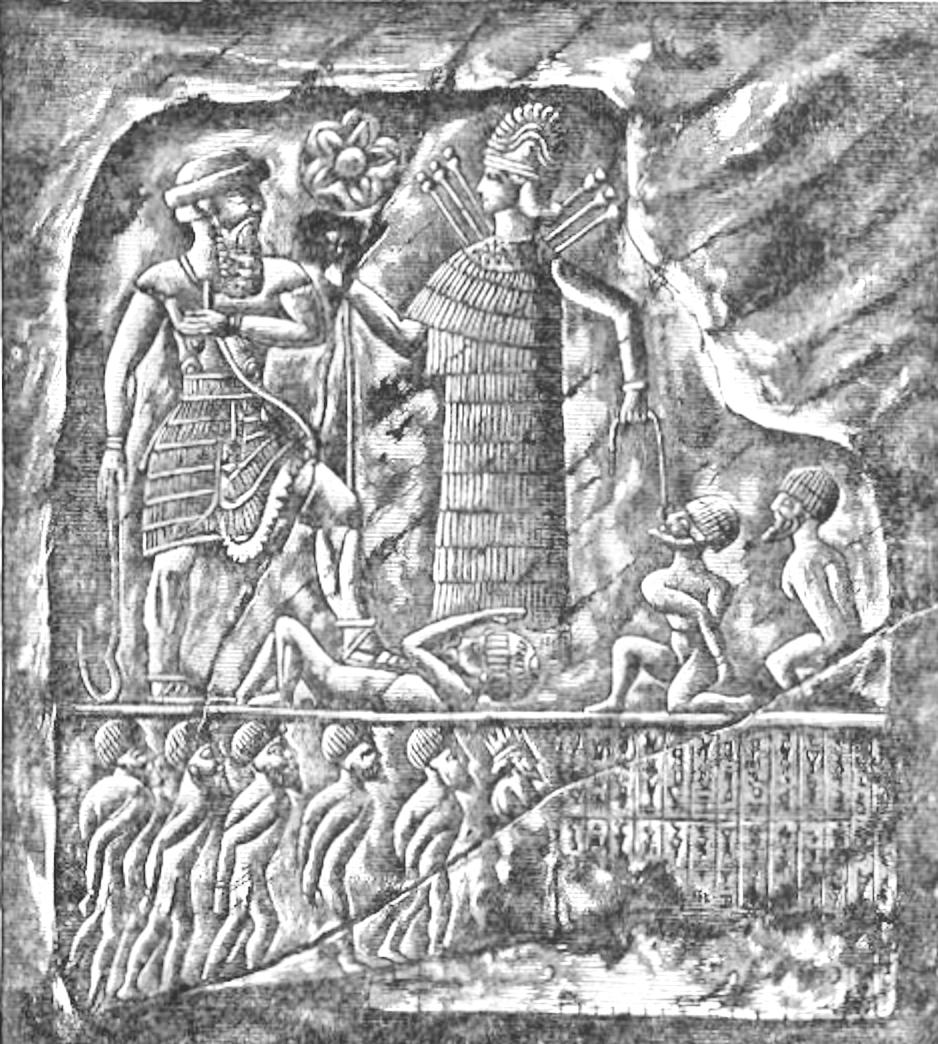
The Anubanini rock relief, dated to 2300 BC, and made by the pre-Iranian Lullubi ruler Anubanini, is very similar in content to the Behistun reliefs (woodprint).

The Anubanini rock relief, also called Sarpol-i Zohab, of the Lullubi king Anubanini, dated to c. 2300 BC, and which is located not far from the Behistun reliefs at Sarpol-e Zahab, is very similar to the reliefs at Behistun. The attitude of the ruler, the trampling of an enemy, the lines of prisoners are all very similar, to such extent that it is speculated that the sculptors of the Behistun inscription had probably seen the Anubanini relief beforehand and were inspired by it. The Lullubian reliefs were the model for the Behistun reliefs of Darius the Great.

The inscriptional tradition of the Achaemenids, starting especially with Darius I, is thought to have derived from the traditions of Elam, Lullubi, the Babylonians and the Assyrians.

However, the Behistun does not directly depict any battle, and describes the campaigns with a formulaic brevity. Similar to earlier inscriptions, Behistun stresses the connection between victories and divine approval. Selective geographical patterns, dates, and statistics serve to enhance the inscription's credibility.

== See also ==
- Behistun Palace
- Achaemenid dynasty
- Taq-e Bostan (Rock reliefs of various Sassanid kings)
- Pasargadae (Tomb of Pasargadae Cyrus the Great)
- Shapur I's inscription at the Ka'ba-ye Zartosht
- Naqsh-e Rajab
- Cities of the Ancient Near East
- Gaumata (False Smerdis)
- Anubanini rock relief
- List of colossal sculptures in situ
