= Mount Behistun =

Mountain in Kermanshah Province, Iran

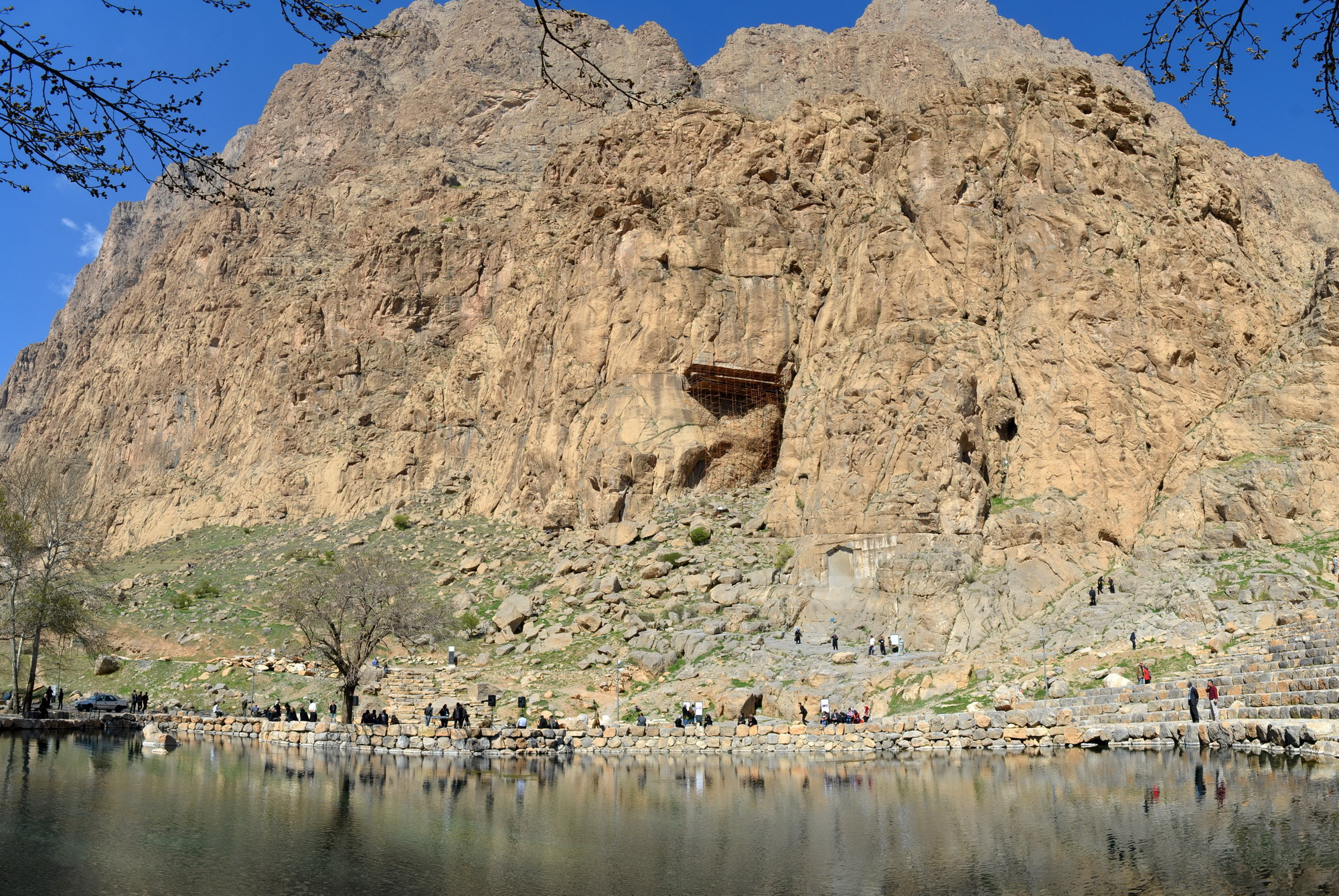

Highest point
- Elevation: 2,752 m (9,029 ft)
- Coordinates: 34°23′23″N 47°25′38″E

Naming
- Native name: بیستون (Persian)

Geography
- Location within Iran
- Location: Kermanshah province, Iran
- Parent range: Zagros Mountains

Mount Bisotoun (or Behistun and Bisotun) is a mountain of the Zagros Mountains range, located in Kermanshah Province, western Iran. It is located 525 kilometers (326 mi) west of Tehran.

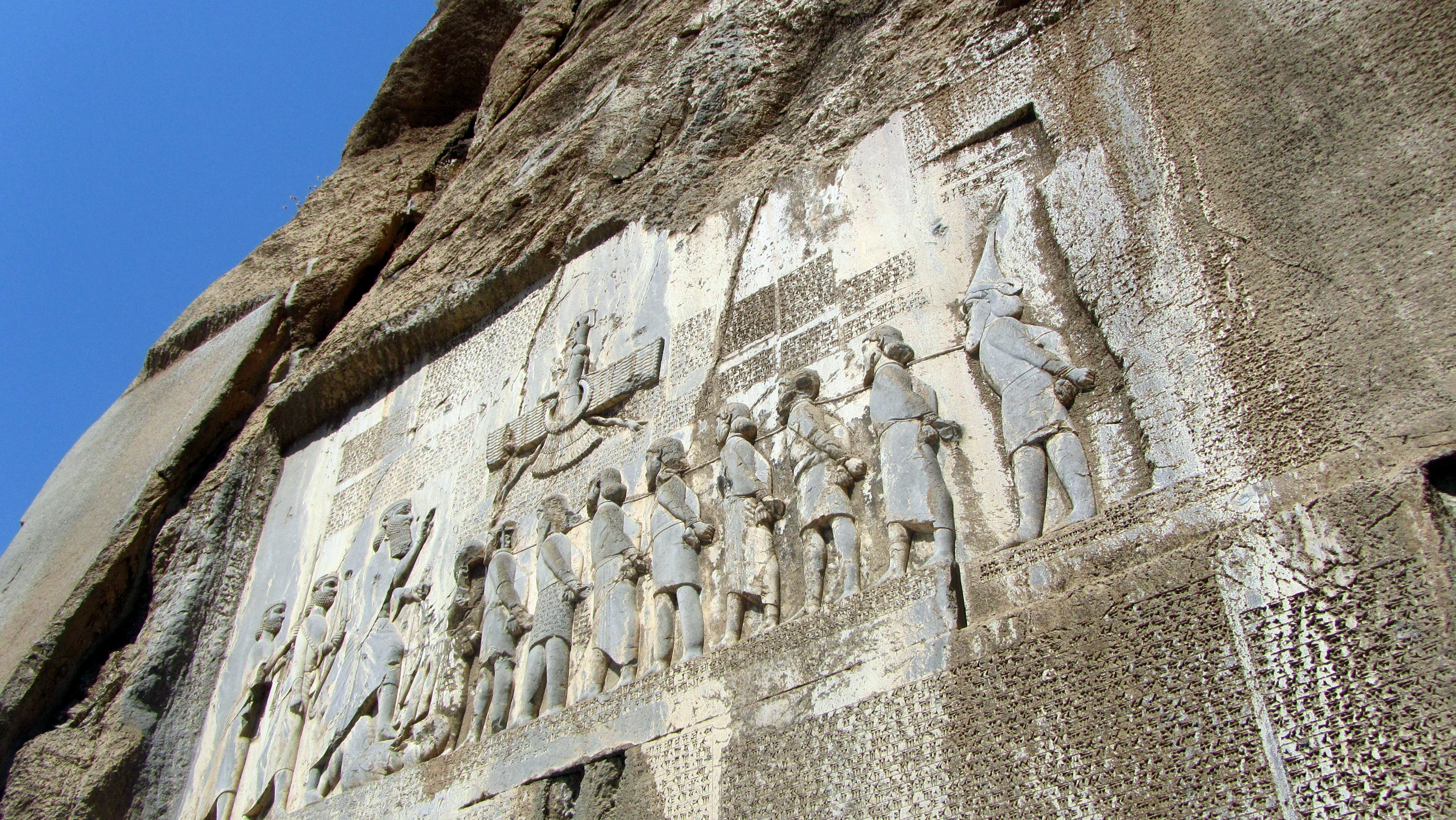
Behistun Inscription of Darius the Great

== Cultural history ==
Mount Bisotoun, aka Bīsitūn (referring to the mountain and the nearby village), is a mountain with a rock precipice in the Zagros Mountains in Kermanshah, Iran. Darius I inscribed the flat rock face in three languages c. 500 BC, known as the Behistun Inscription.

=== Legends ===
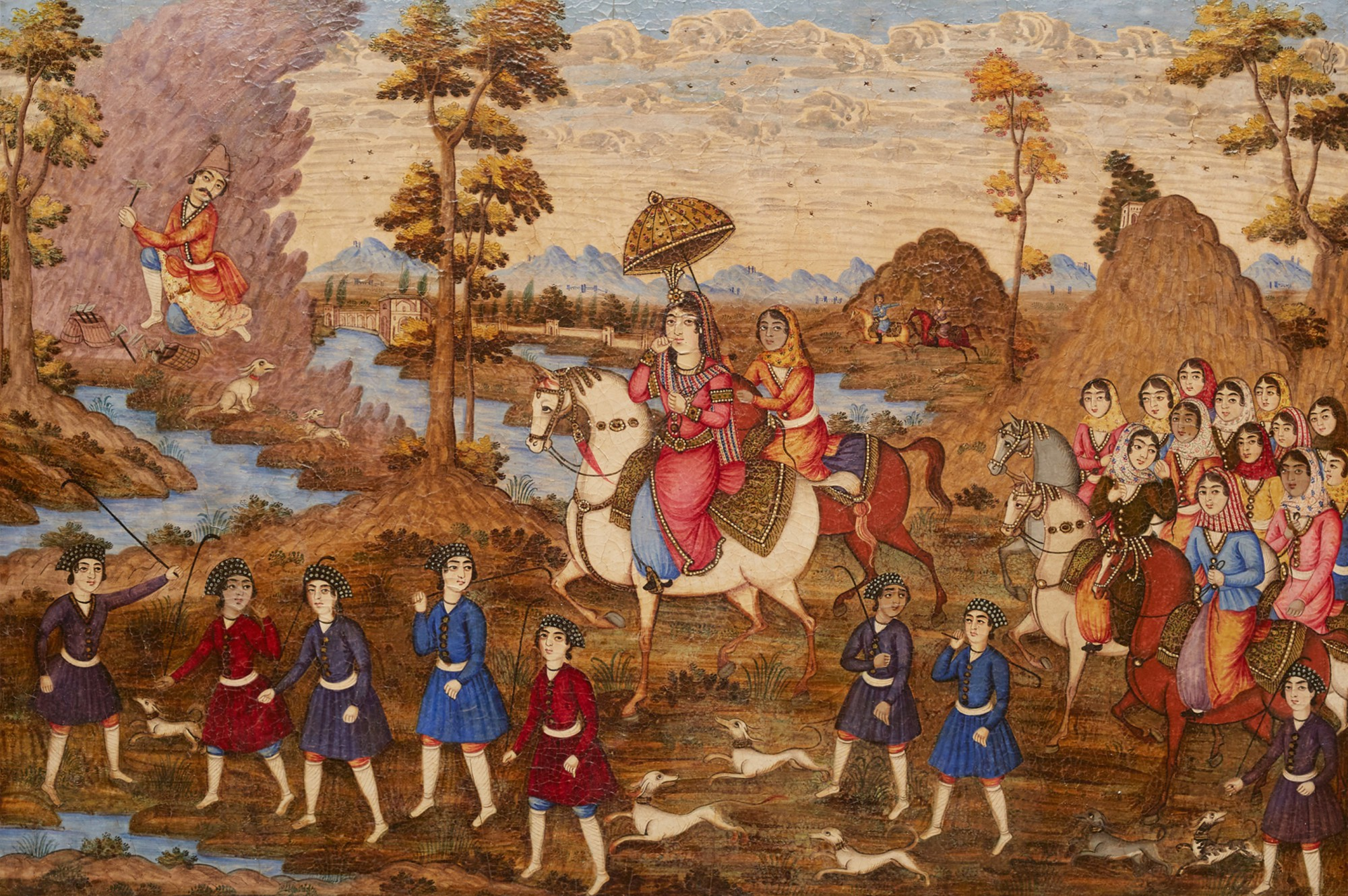
Shirin on horseback visiting Farhad on Mount Bisotun, who is shown carving out the mountain. Created in 19th-century Qajar Iran

A legend began around Mount Bisotoun, as written about by the Persian poet Nezami about a man named Farhad, who was a lover of Shirin.

== Gallery ==
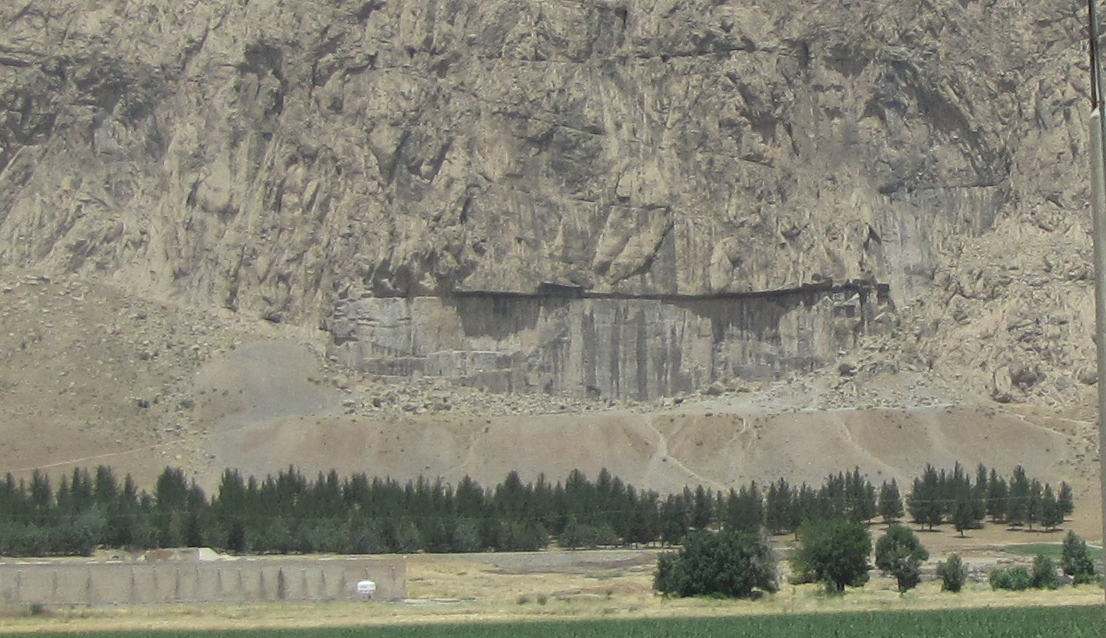
Farhad Tarash at the base of Mount Behistun

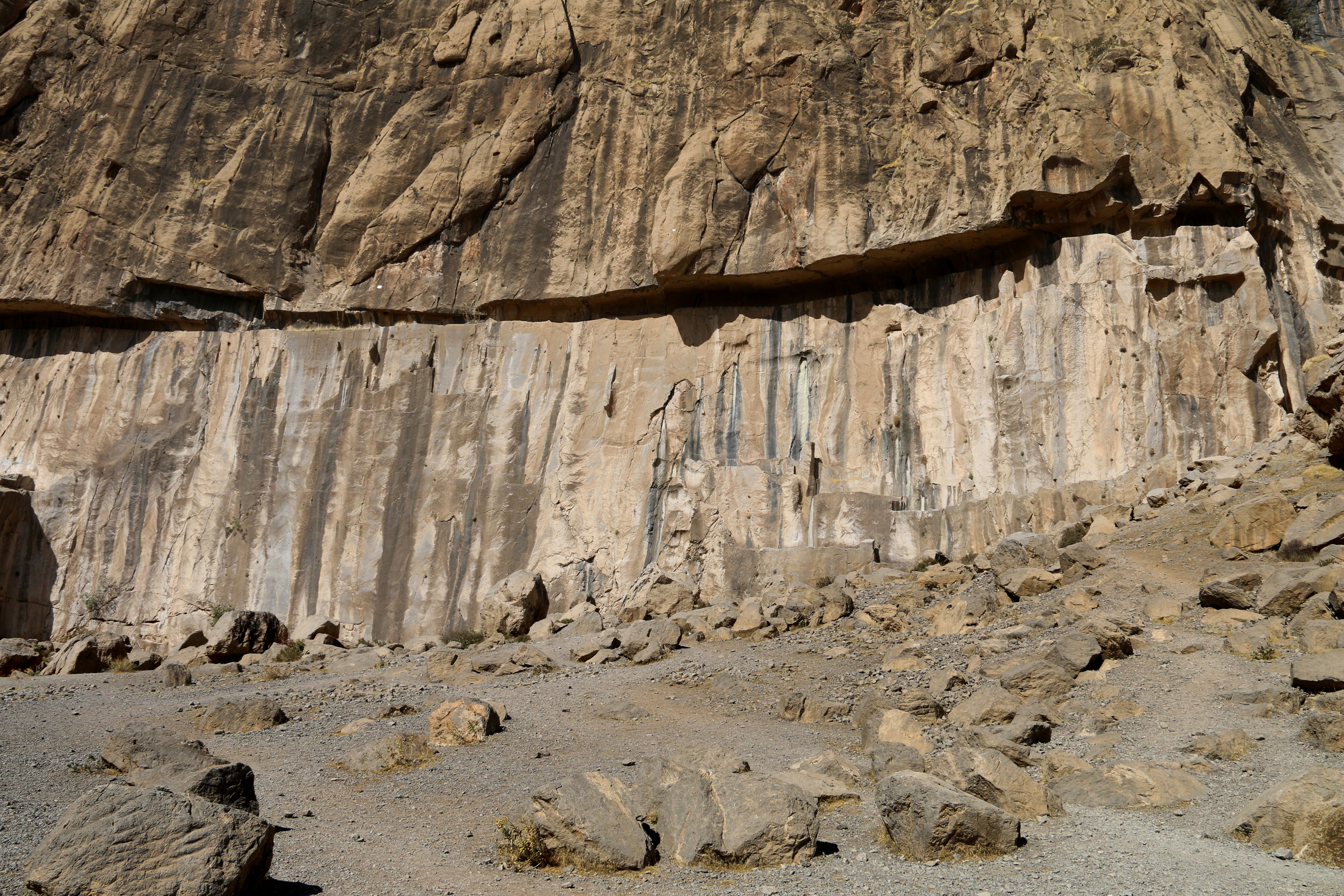
Farhad Tarash at the base of Mount Behistun

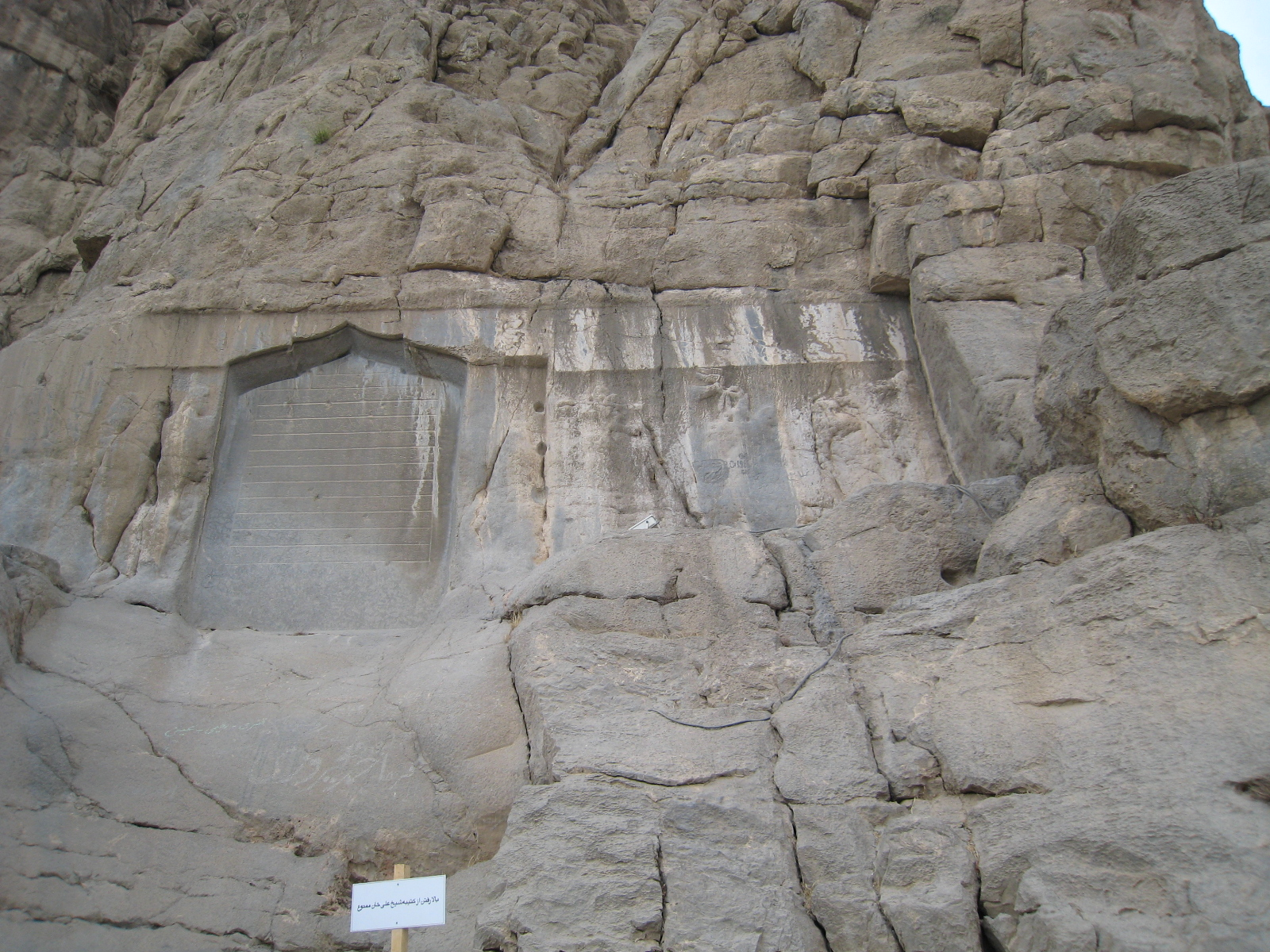
Goudarz

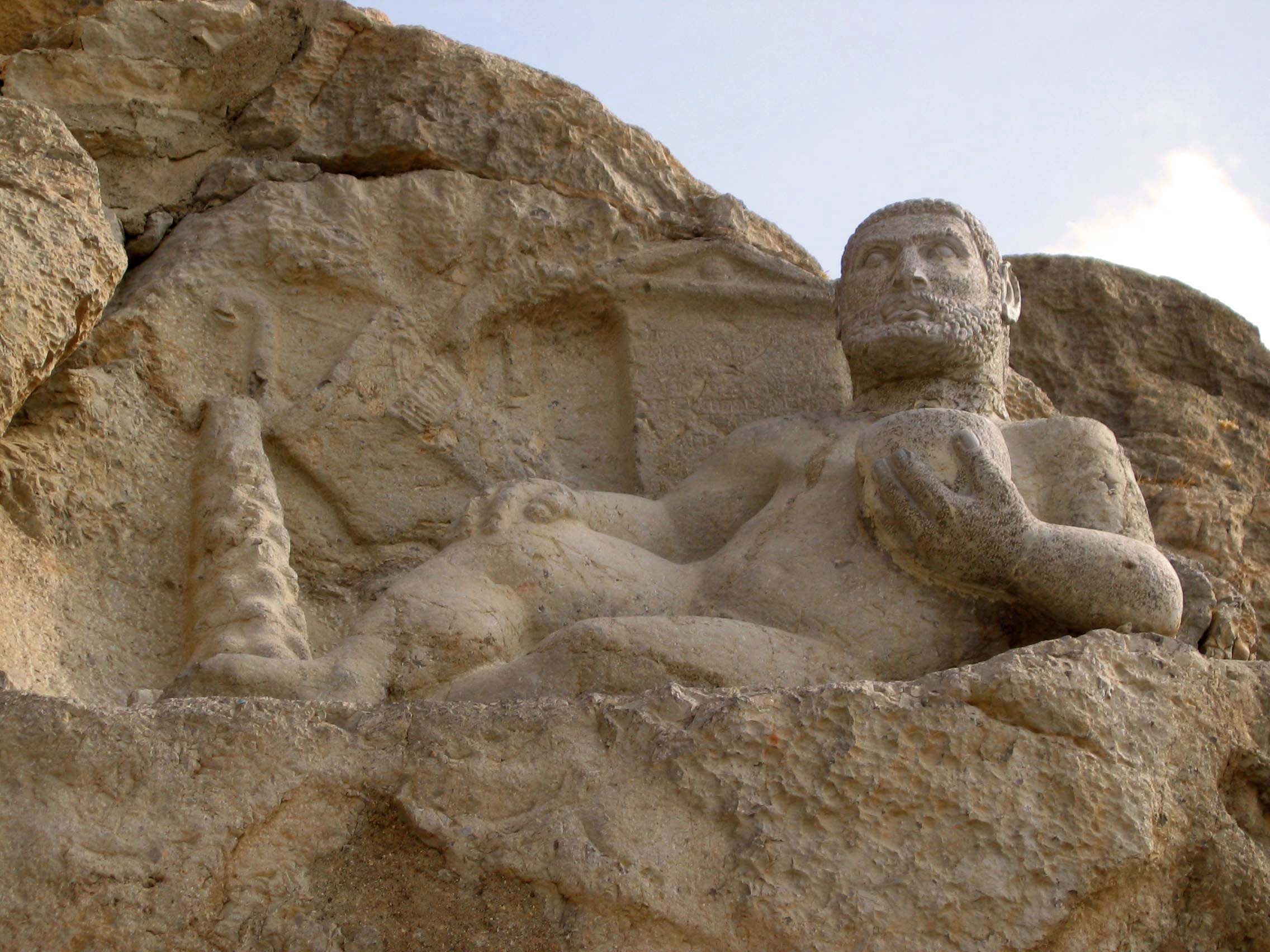
Hercules Statue

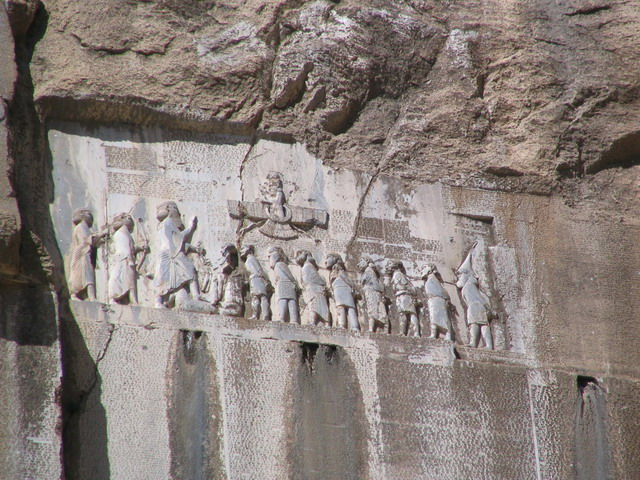
Darius I the Great's inscription
