= Farhād Tarāsh =

Long smoothed rock surface on Mount Behistun in Iran

Coordinates: 34°23′17.94″N 47°25′55.11″E

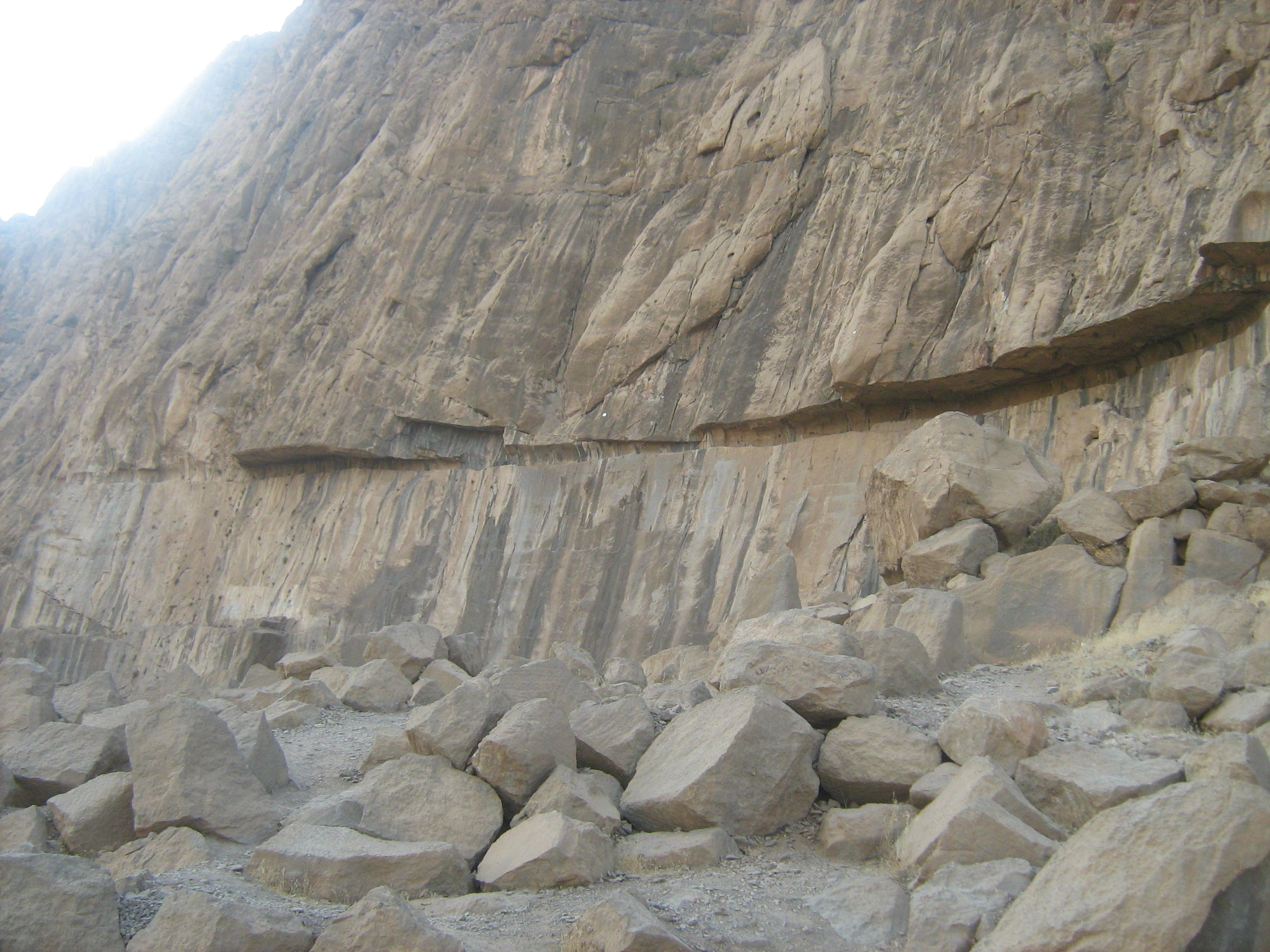
Farhād Tarāsh

The Farhād Tarāsh (Persian: فرهاد تراش), or Tarāsh-e Farhād, is a long smoothed rock surface on Mount Behistun in western Iran. Located near the famous Behistun Inscription, its height is around 30 meters and its width is around 200 meters. The retaining wall in front of it is c. 150 meters. The work is registered as a national heritage in Iran, and is the biggest work of its kind in Iran. The Farhād Tarāsh has sparked interest from medieval geographers including Istakhri (died 957) and Yaqut al-Hamawi (died 1229) to travelers and archaeologists in modern times.

== Creation ==
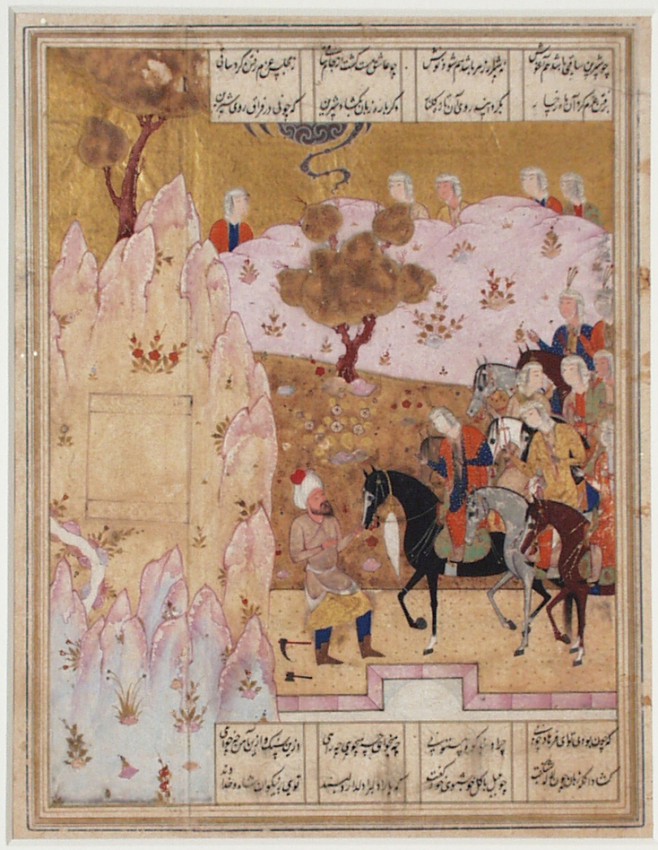
Shirin visiting Farhad at Mount Bisotun. Farhad's carving tools are lying behind him on the ground. Page from a manuscript of the Khamsa (Quintet) of Nizami Ganjavi. Created in Shiraz, Safavid Iran, dated circa 1550

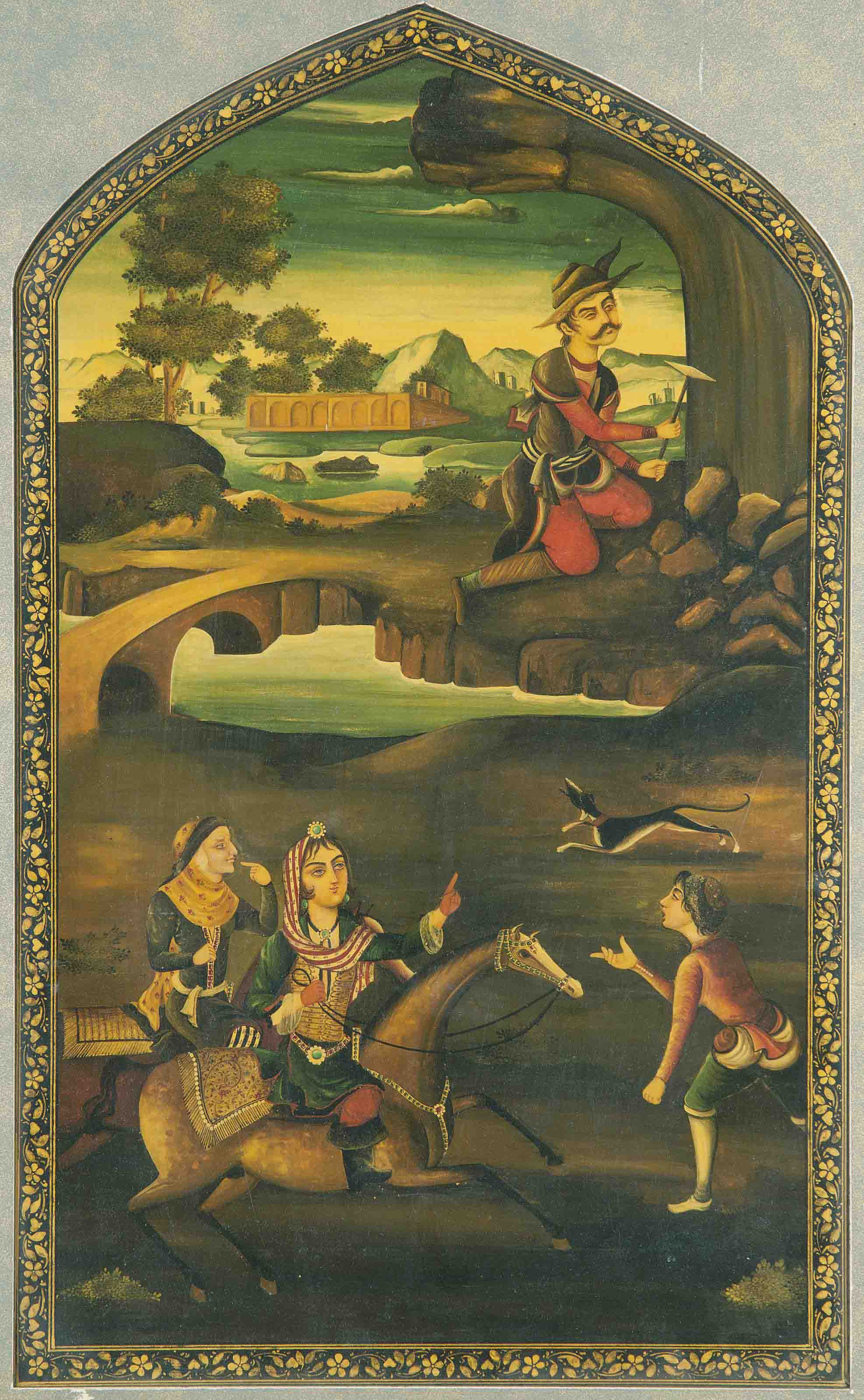
Shirin, on horseback, visits Farhad at Mount Bisotun, who is depicted carving out the mountain. Created in late 19th/early 20th century Qajar Iran

Various interpretations have been given about its creation. In the early 19th century, H. C. Rawlinson believed that the Tarāsh-e Farhād was originally meant to become the rear wall of a palace of Khosrow II (r. 590–628) and was supposed to be decorated with a relief of Semiramis. In the early 20th century, L. W. King and R. C. Thompson viewed it as a site for a palace of a Sasanian king. Around the same period, A. V. Williams Jackson believed the Tarāsh-e Farhād to be the location of a planned inscription of Darius the Great (r. 522–486 BC), King of Kings of the Persian Achaemenid Empire. Ernst Herzfeld also viewed it as an unfinished Achaemenid inscription, however he did not assign a specific date to it unlike Jackson. Erich Schmidt, M. Golzari and D. Huff later viewed the Tarāsh-e Farhād as a field prepared for an inscription with its date of creation being unknown.

According to local tradition, "as reported in the 1960s" and noted earlier by A. V. Williams Jackson, the Tarāsh-e Farhād is attributed to the legendary architect of Khosrow II named Farhad. Farhad features in Nizami Ganjavi's famous tragic romance Khosrow and Shirin, which he started writing in c. 1180. According to Nizami (died 1209), Farhad completed three monumental works: the creation of the milk channel, a passage cut through the mountain at Bisotun, and the portrait of princess Shirin. From the 15th to the 20th century, the story of Farhad and Shirin was a popular theme in various forms of visual art, including miniatures. A miniature of c. 1575 depicts Farhad and Shirin near the pool at Mount Behistun, while the hillside on the same artwork shows a large flat piece of stone with effigies of Farhad and Shirin. This slab "is clearly identifiable" as the Tarāsh-e Farhād. The Encyclopedia Iranica adds:

Taken together, the poetry, the miniatures, and the data from examination of the site suggest that Farhād was the architect of the Sasanian works at Bīsotūn. The chiseled rock face must be the wall of his “passage through the mountain for twenty horsemen.” The milk channel, which is also often depicted in miniatures, is likely to have been the working channel on top of the cliff—an opinion in which G. Cameron concurred (oral communication). The notion of the “portrait of Šīrīn” may well have been evoked by the capitals showing Anāhīd and Ḵosrow Parvēz, which were certainly visible in the time of Neẓāmī and his informants, as they have never been buried under earth. The first writer to connect them with Šīrīn was ʿAbd-al-Karīm, in 1145/1741, probably relying on local tradition. References to the Sasanian remains in the literature of the early Islamic period apparently stirred people's imaginations and inspired poetic compositions in later times. Although Neẓāmī never left his hometown, Ganja, and thus never saw Bīsotūn, he had access to information recorded by geographers in the 4th/10th century and passed on as part of the literary tradition.

Another perspective of the context and creation of the Farhād Tarāsh was offered in the 1970s by architect W. Salzmann. Salzmann conducted examinations of the cliff and the rock face in order to reconstruct the original Sasanian plans; according to his research, "a huge terrace" was planned to be built at 30 meters high and a massive ayvan (Middle Persian: āywan) was to be hollowed out of the rock. According to Salzmann, the scale of the ayvan was probably approaching the Taq-e Kasra at Ctesiphon, the Sasanian royal capital. He also noted that reliefs were going to be added on either side. The Encyclopedia Iranica notes that Salzmann's hypothesis "is consonant with earlier theories suggesting a palace", or a fire temple built against the cliff; however, the Encyclopedia Iranica adds these theories are "impossible to prove conclusively".

== Stone blocks on the hillside ==
Right next to it on the hillside are several hundred dressed stone blocks. They were recorded by early European travelers who visited Iran, but they were not identified as being from the Sasanian era until Heinz Luschey managed to examine them. Luschey concluded that these stones were made of the same rock as the Farhād Tarāsh.

== Gallery ==
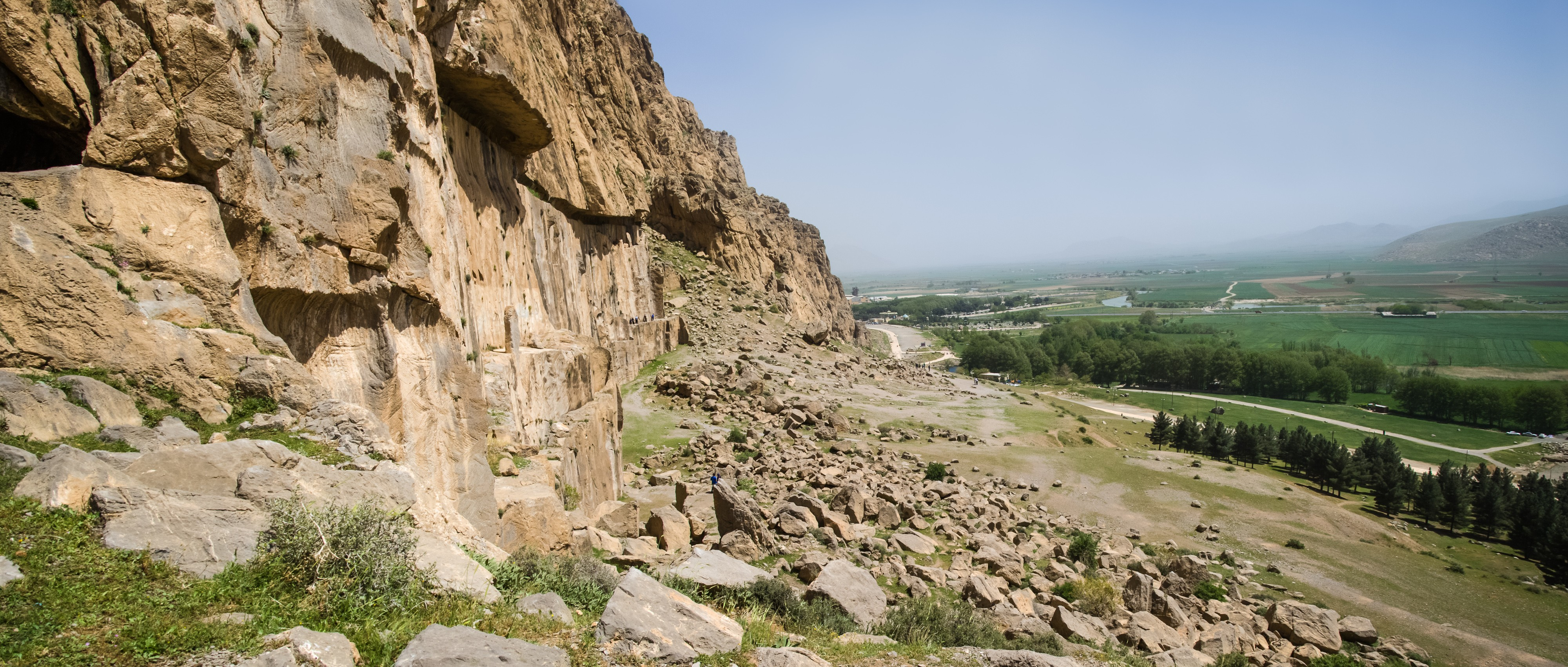

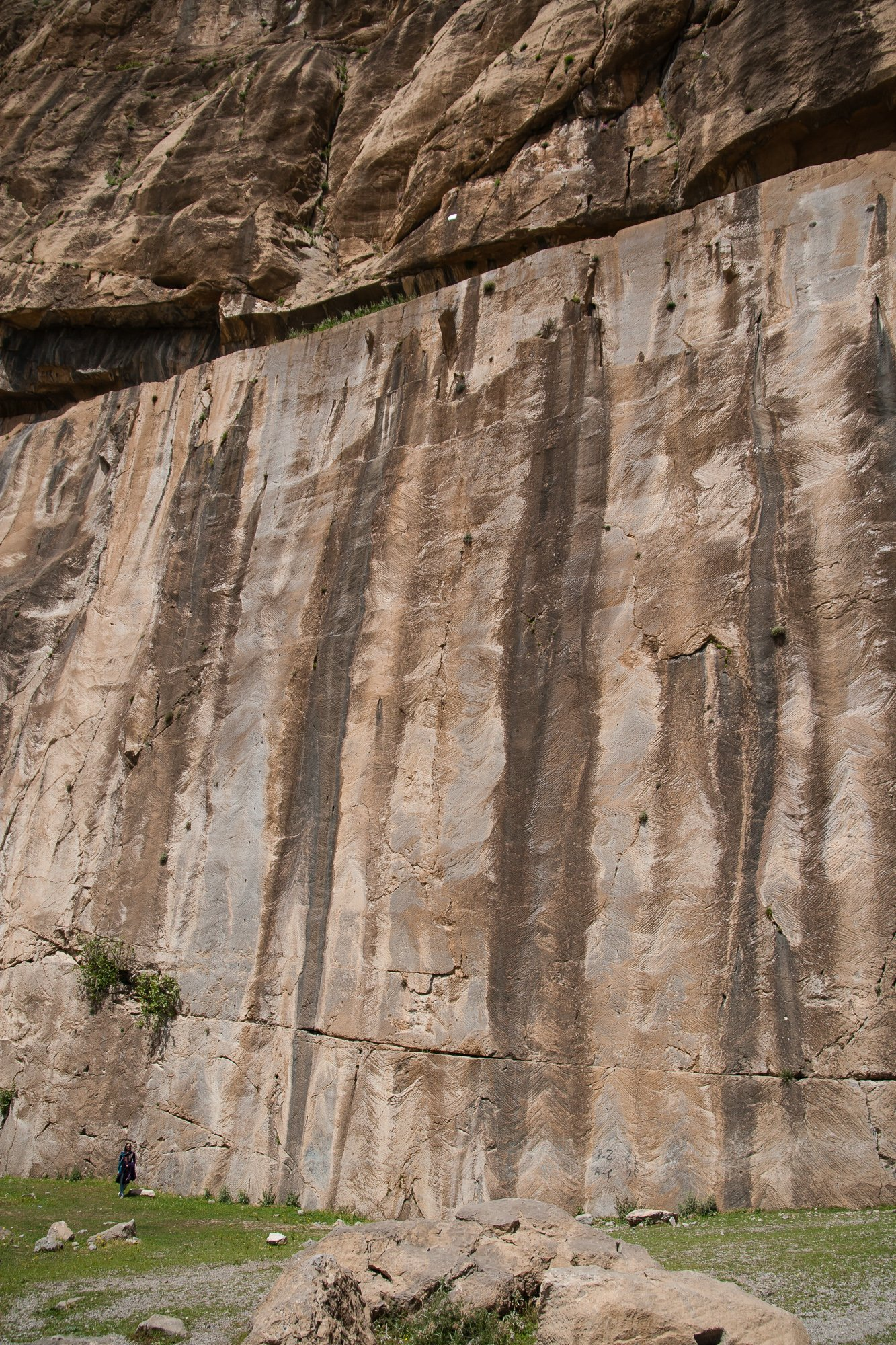

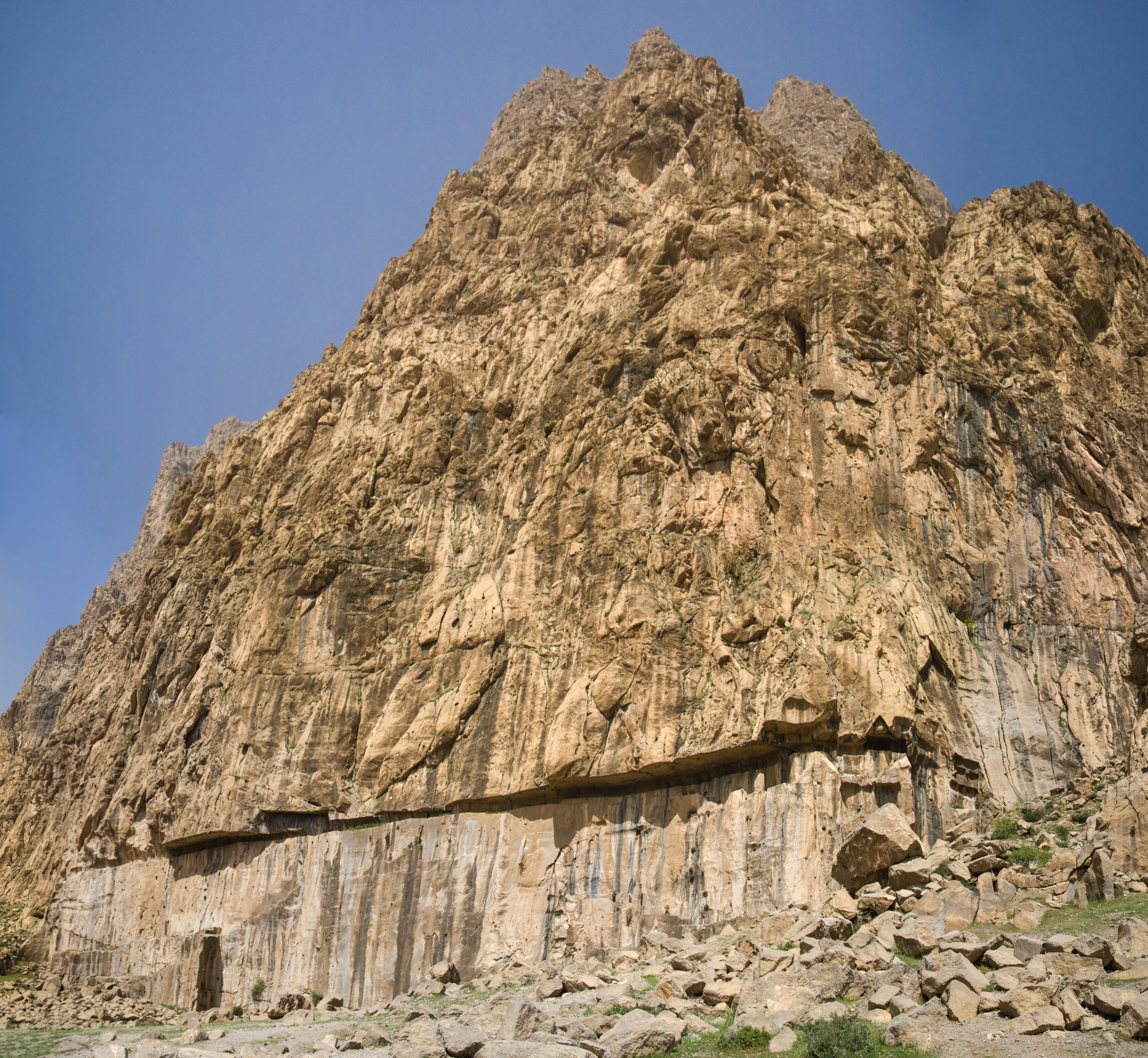

== Sources ==
- Canepa, Matthew (2018). "ayvan". In Nicholson, Oliver (ed.). The Oxford Dictionary of Late Antiquity. Oxford: Oxford University Press. ISBN 978-0-19-866277-8.
- Luschey, Heinz (2013). "BISOTUN ii. Archeology". Encyclopaedia Iranica, Vol. IV, Fasc. 3. pp. 291–299.
