= Statue of Hercules in Behistun =

Rock statue on Mount Behistun, Iran

Coordinates: 34.3833°N 47.4333°E

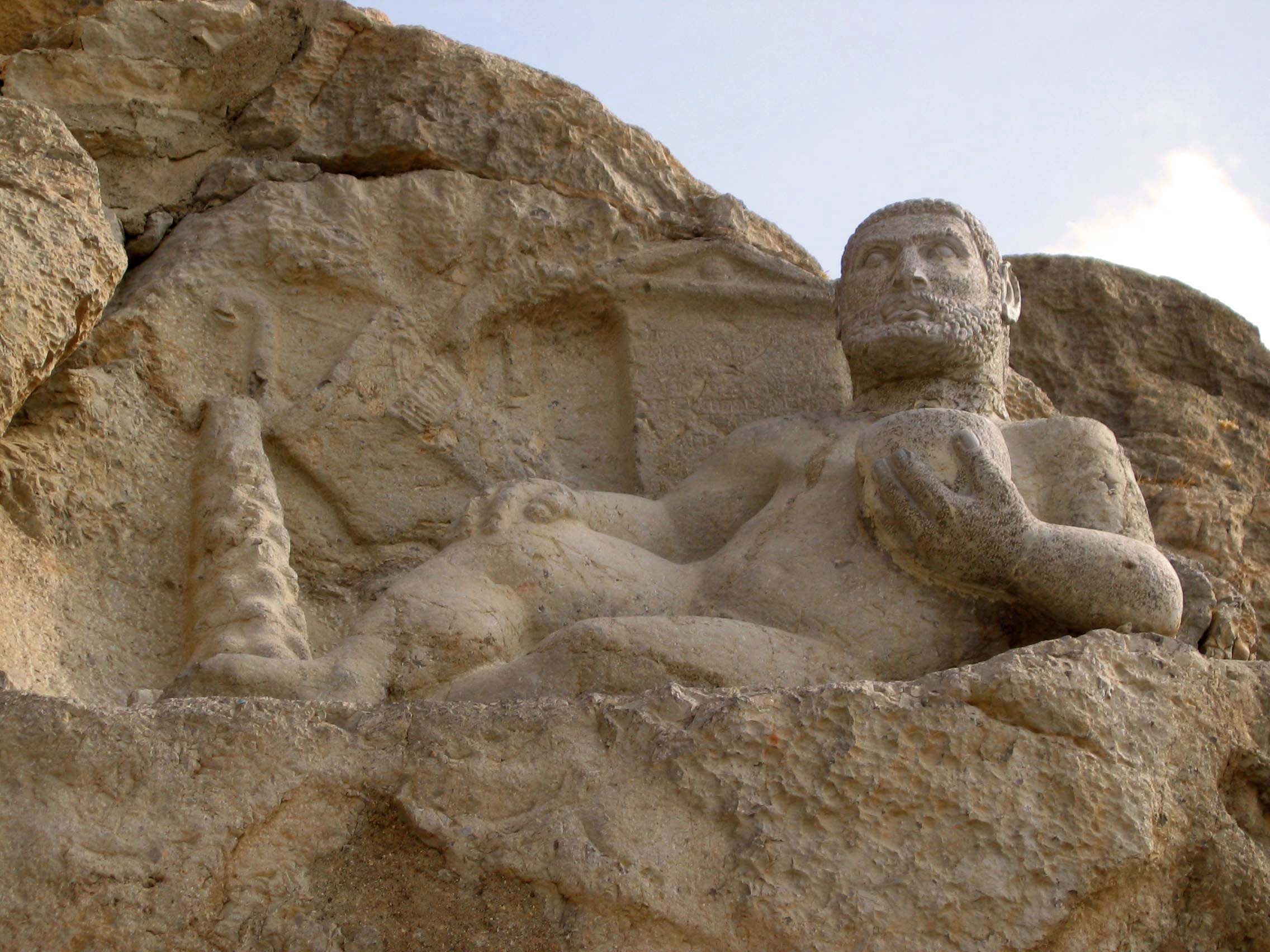
Herakles at Behistun, sculpted for a Seleucid governor in 148 BCE

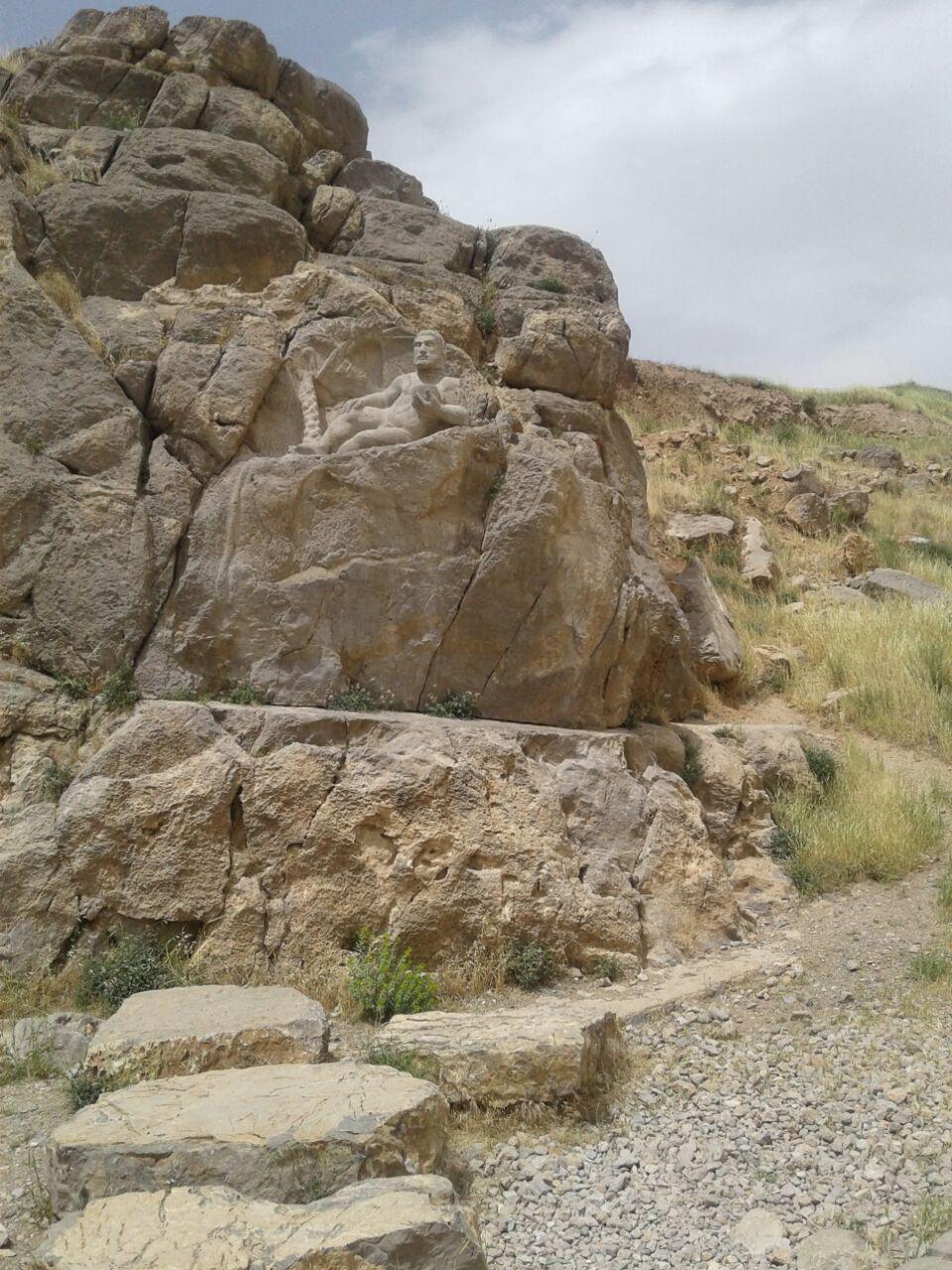
The statue in context

The Statue of Hercules in Behistun (or Statue of Heracles/Herakles in Bisotun, Persian: تندیس هرکول) is located on Mount Behistun, Iran. It was discovered in 1958, and is the only extant rock sculpture from the period of Seleucid control over the Iranian Plateau, that lasted from c. 312 BC to c. 140/139 BC.

The statue was sculpted in 148 BC, and dedicated in the name of "Herakles Kallinikos" (Ἡρακλῆν Καλλίνικον, "Hercules glorious in victory") by a Seleucid governor. The Seleucid governor carved it in honor of a satrap.

Hercules is lying on a 2 m-long (6.6 ft) platform and holds a bowl in his left hand. His right hand rests on his leg. The statue is 1.47 m (4 ft 10 in) long and is attached to the mountain. Heracles's club is carved in relief "as if propped up behind him" according to Matthew P. Canepa. The form of the stele bears similarities to Seleucid stelae that bore official inscriptions in the area, most notably the stele from Laodicia-in-Media (Nahavand), on which a local Seleucid official wrote down a copy of the dynastic cult inscription of Seleucid ruler Antiochus III the Great (r. 222–187 BC), which he had created for his wife Queen Laodice III. The head of the statue was stolen twice, but was recovered in 1996. The current head is a replica. The original head is held by the Cultural Heritage, Handcrafts and Tourism Organization.

== Description ==
The Bisotun Hercules was carved by a sculptor who was not formally trained in the Greek sculptural style. According to the modern historian Rolf Strootman, the design was more Iranian than Greek. In Hellenistic art, Heracles is seldom shown wielding a bow. In the rock relief, however, he is wielding a bow resembling those shown in the Behistun inscription. Although the epithet of the god ("kallinikos") was quite common in the Greek religion, it was also appropriate for the Iranian god Wahrām (Avestan Vərəθraγna-), with whom Hercules was assimilated. The statue of Hercules at Bisotun most likely attests to assimilation of the Greek god Hercules with the Iranian god Wahrām in the Seleucid period; however, it does not offer unequivocal evidence.

The relief may have been part of a naiskos (small shrine), as indicated by the nearby remnant of a small Ionic column, which is the same height (52 cm [20 in]) as that of the Temple of Athena Nike in Athens.

== Inscriptions ==
Behind the statue is a Greek inscription. An Aramaic version, drawn "quite a bit lighter" than the Greek version, is thought to have been carved below it, although only the word šnt ("in the year") is discernible. Canepa notes that this indicates that the sponsor of the inscription "intended to situate this message, both visually and linguistically, within the idiom of Seleucid imperial epigraphy".

Dedicatory inscription of Herakles (Behistun, 153 BCE)
Translation

In the year 164 (of the Seleucid era)
in the month of Panemos (June)
[set this statue of] Herakles
Kallinikos ("Hercules glorious in victory")
did Hyakinthos, son of Pantauchos,
for the safety of Kleomenes,
Commander of the Upper Satrapies,
of the satraps.

Inscription
(original Greek script)

ἔτους δξρ᾽, μηνὸς
Πανήμου, Ἡρακλῆν
Καλλίνικον
Ὑάκινθος Πανταύχου
ὑπὲ[ρ] τῆς Κλεομένου
τοῦ ἐπὶ τῶν ἄνω
σ[ατρ]απειῶν σωτηρίας
τῶν σατραπῶν

Original inscription

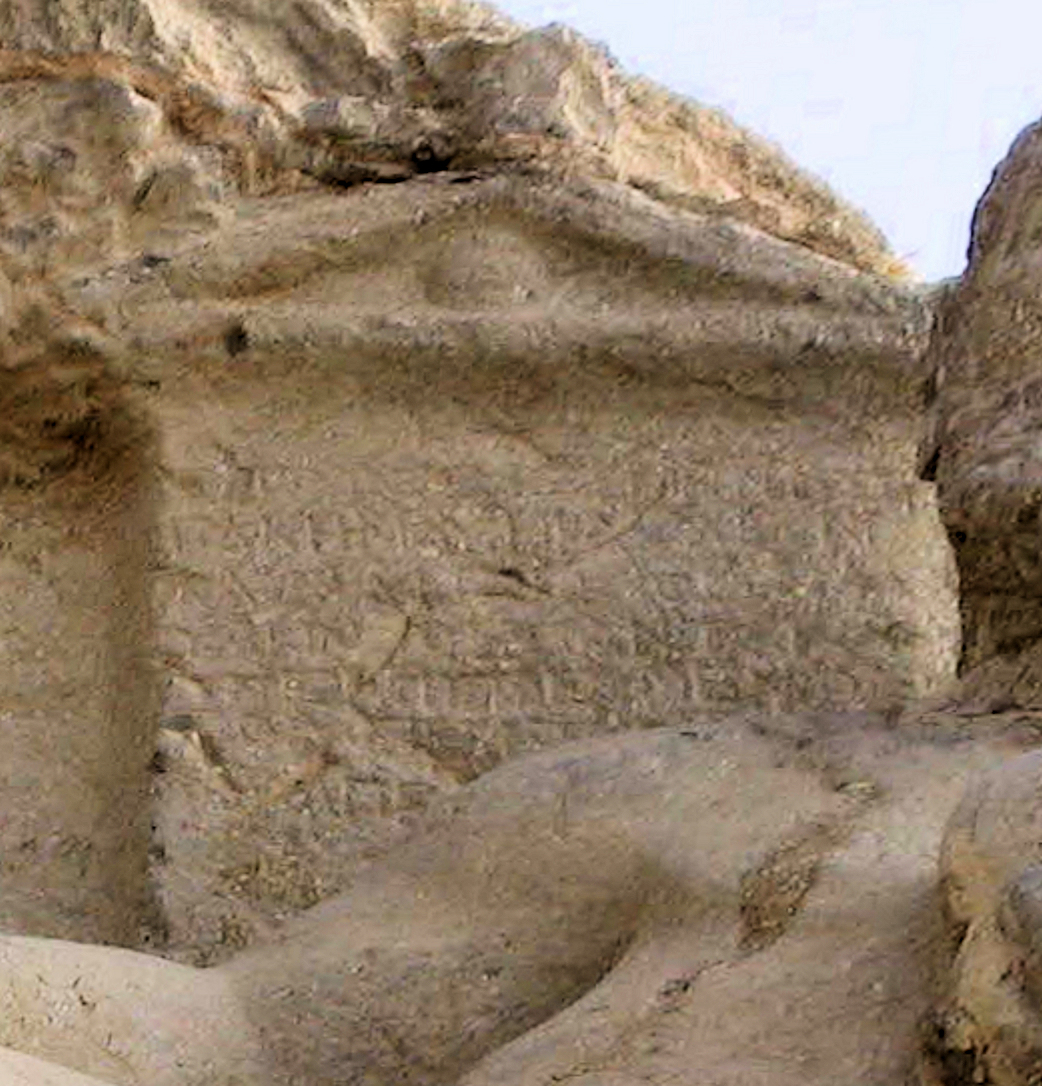
Herakles inscription at Behistun

== Sources ==
- Canepa, Matthew (2018). The Iranian Expanse: Transforming Royal Identity Through Architecture, Landscape, and the Built Environment, 550 BCE–642 CE. Oakland: University of California Press. ISBN 978-0-520-37920-6.
- Strootman, Rolf (2020). "Hellenism and Persianism in Iran". Dabir. 7: 201–227. doi:10.1163/29497833-00701016. hdl:1874/408015.
