= Parthian Stone =

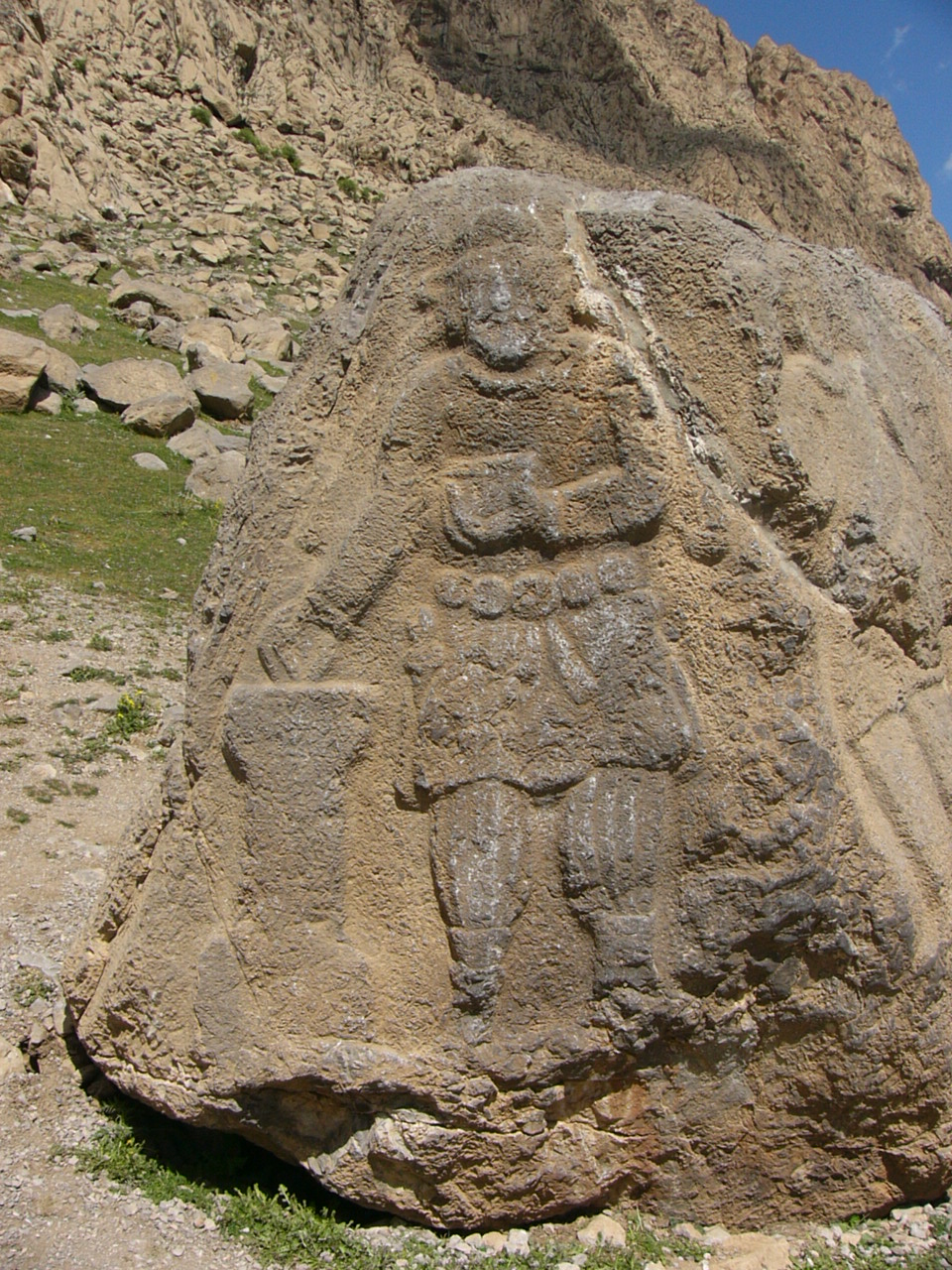
The Parthian Stone in Bisotun, Iran

The Parthian Stone is a relief located in the ancient site of Bisotun in Kermanshah Province, Iran, a UNESCO world heritage site. It shows a Parthian king with a bowl in his left hand. It also has an inscription, which identifies the king as Vologases. Six kings named Vologases are known to have ruled the Parthian Empire, from 51 to the 220s CE. The inscription may refer to Vologases I or Vologases III. This historical heritage was listed in Iranian national heritages on 10 March 2002.

The inscription, written in nine lines on the surface of the altar, uses the Aramaic script to transcribe the Parthian language logographically, and reads:

Vologases, King of Kings, son of (Vo)l(ogases), K(ing of Kings), grandson of P(...)

— Vologases inscription.

Vologases is seen frontally, holding a bowl and sacrificing at an altar, and is flanked by two attendants carved on the sides of the rock.

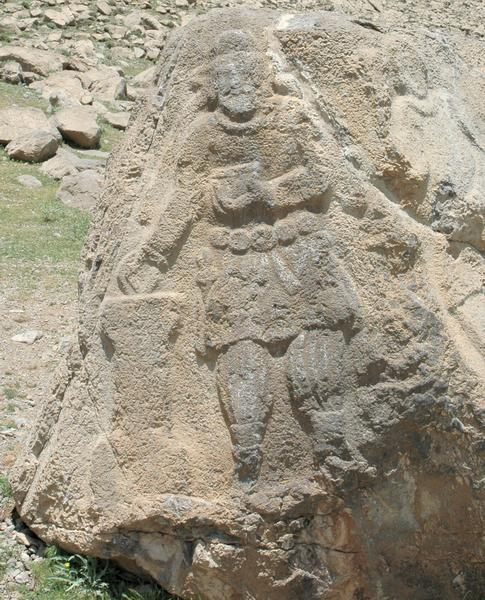
Vologases

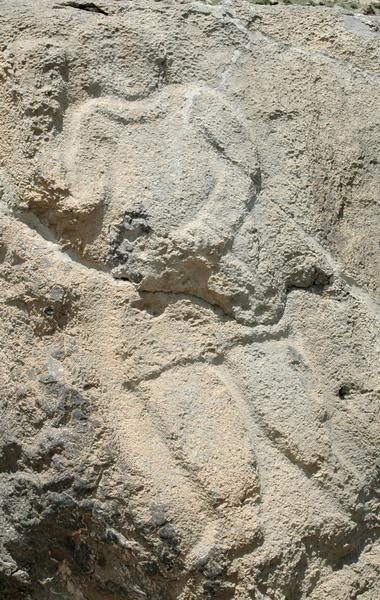
Attendant at the proper left of the King

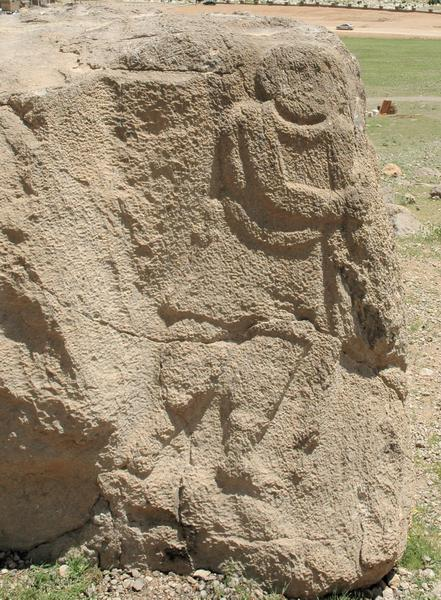
Attendant at the proper right of the King

== Sources ==
- Canepa, Matthew P. (2018). "The Rise of the Arsacids and a New Iranian Topography of Power". The Iranian Expanse: Transforming Royal Identity through Architecture, Landscape, and the Built Environment, 550 BCE–642 CE. University of California Press. pp. 1–512. ISBN 9780520964365.
- Olbrycht, Marek Jan (2016). "The Sacral Kingship of the early Arsacids. I. Fire Cult and Kingly Glory": 91–106.
