= Farhad (Persian literature) =

Legendary Persian Character

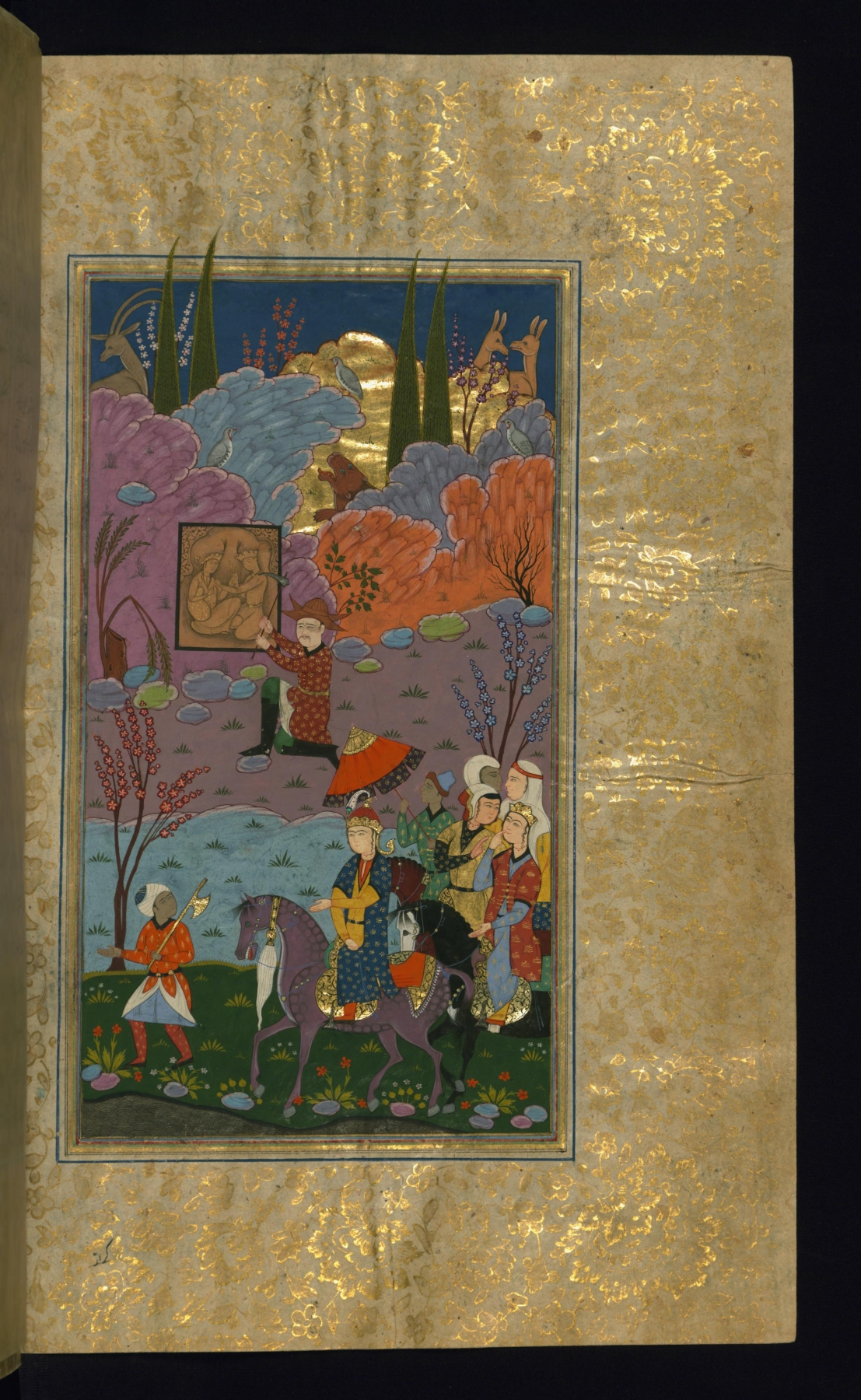
Farhad carves an image of Shirin in the mountain.

Farhād (Middle Persian: Frahāt, Persian: فرهاد) is a famous character in Persian literature and Persian mythology. The story of his love with Shirin is one of the most famous love stories in Persian culture. The most important work about him is Khosrow and Shirin by Persian poet Nezami Ganjavi, but the story was well known in Persian literature long before Nezami. Ferdowsi also narrates the story of Khosrow and Shirin, but in his version, Farhād only plays a minor part. The story of Farhād has Parthian origins. Some writers such as the unknown writer of Mojmal al-tawārīḵ wa’l-qeṣāṣ refer to Farhad as a Kayanian figure. Balʿamī is one of the first writers that refer to Farhad as a Sasanian figure.

== The story of Farhad ==
Farhad is a sculptor who falls in love with Shirin, the princess of Persian Armenia. But Shirin is already in love with Khosrow Parviz, the king of Persia. Khosrow asks Farhad to carve a staircase in a mountain and tells him if he manages to do so, Khosrow will give up Shirin. Farhad tries hard day and night in the hope that Khosrow will let him marry Shirin. Finally, Farhad builds the staircase but Khosrow has a messenger falsely inform Farhad that Shirin has died. Farhad believes this falsehood and jumps to his death from the mountain.

== See also ==
- Farhād Tarāsh
