= Anubanini rock relief =

Rock relief from the Isin-Larsa period, Iran

Anubanini Rock Relief سنگ‌نگاره آنوبانی‌نی
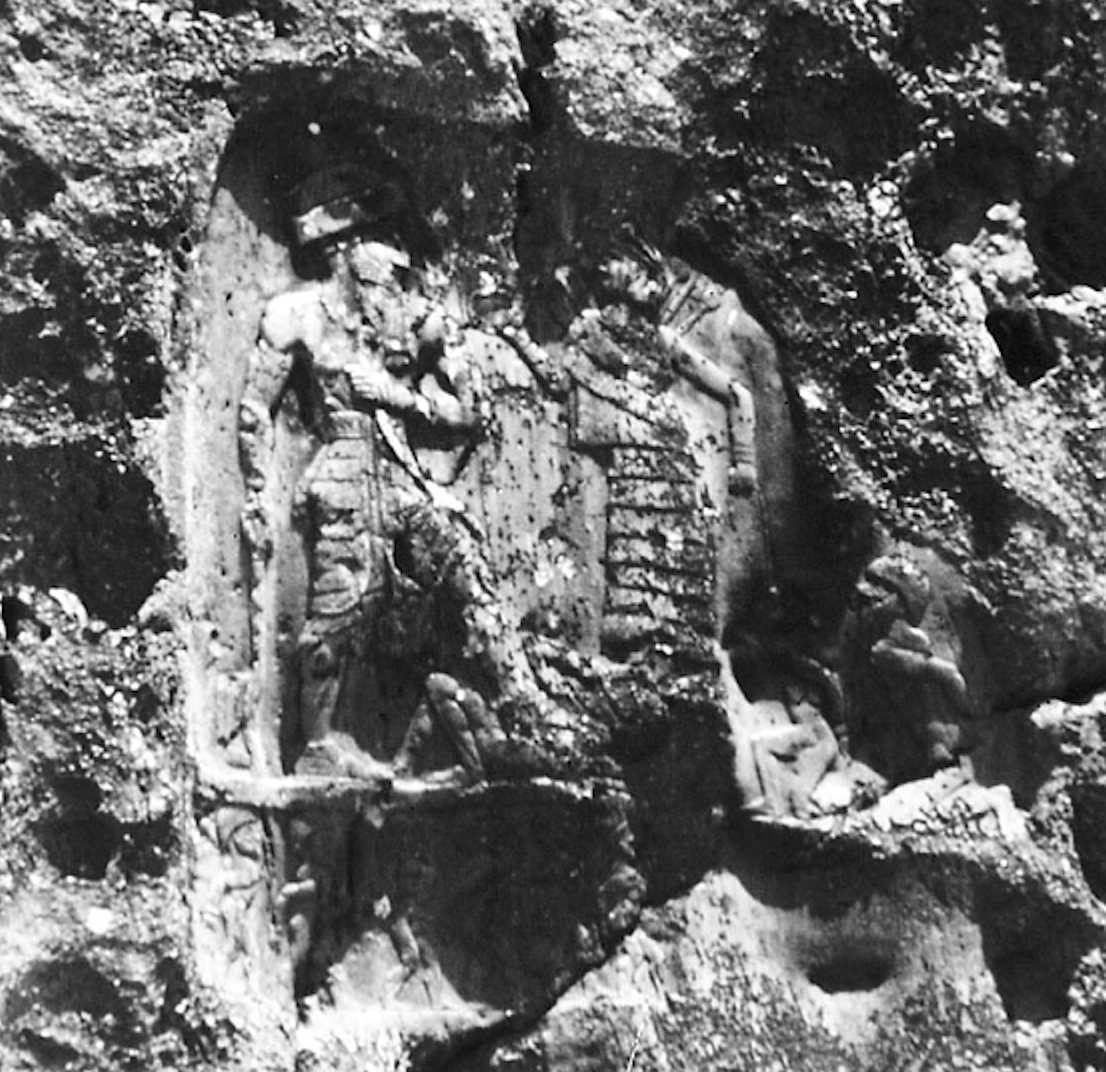
- Anubanini rock relief in 1913, by Ernst Herzfeld

- Location within Iran
- 34°23′26″N 47°26′09″E
- Location: Sarpol-e Zahab, Kermanshahan, Iran

Iran National Heritage List
- Official name: Anubanini Rock Relief
- Type: Rock Relief
- Designated: 1932
- Reference no.: 149
- Conservation organization: Cultural Heritage, Handicrafts and Tourism Organization of Iran

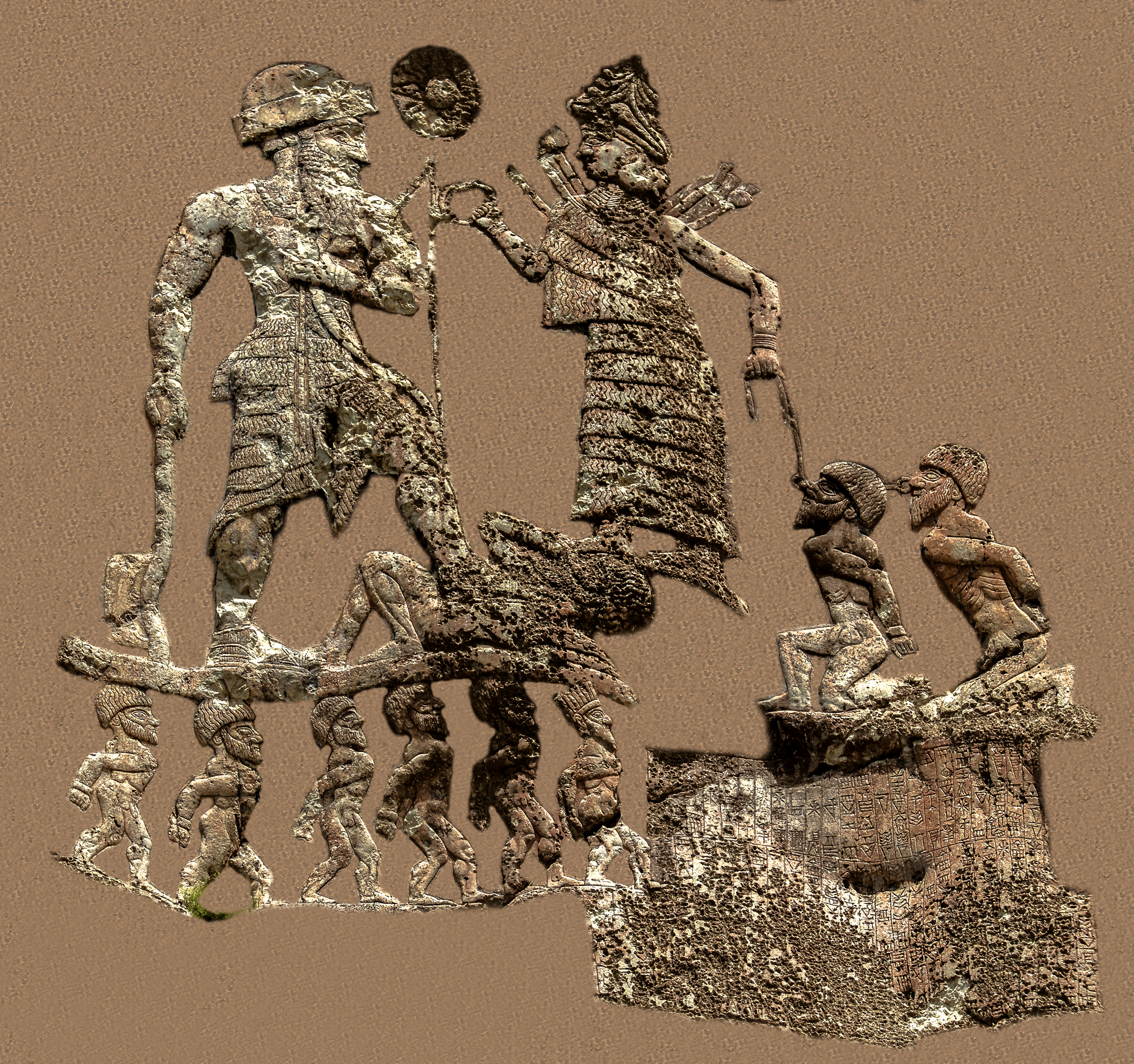
Components of the relief (extracted): king Anubanini trampling a foe, goddess Ishtar, two groups of prisoners, and an inscription in Akkadian

Comparative locations of Behistun and the Anubanini rock reliefs.

The Anubanini petroglyph (Persian: سنگ‌نگاره آنوبانی‌نی), also called Sar-e Pol-e Zohab II or Sarpol-i Zohab relief, is a rock relief from the Akkad period (circa 2300 BC) or the Isin-Larsa period (early second millennium BC) located in Kermanshah province, Iran. The rock relief is believed to belong to the Lullubi culture and is located 120 kilometers away from the north of Kermanshah, close to Sarpol-e Zahab. Lullubi reliefs are the earliest rock reliefs of Iran, later ones being the Elamite reliefs of Eshkaft-e Salman and Kul-e Farah.

== Description ==
In the rock relief, Anubanini, the king of the Lullubi, puts his foot on the chest of a captive. There are eight other captives, two of them kneeling behind the Lullubian equivalent of the Akkadian goddess Ishtar (recognisable by the four pairs of horns on her headdress and the weapons over her shoulders) and six of them standing in a lower row at the bottom of the rock relief. He is bare-chested, only wearing a short skirt.

The general style of the Anubanini relief emulates the style of Mesopotamian royal art of the period, as well as its language, in using the Akkadian language and script for this inscription.

== Inscription ==
There's also an inscription in the Akkadian language and Akkadian script. In the inscription, he declares himself as the mighty king of Lullubium, who had set up his image as well as that of Ishtar on mount Batir, and calls on various deities to preserve his monument. The inscription begins with the formula:

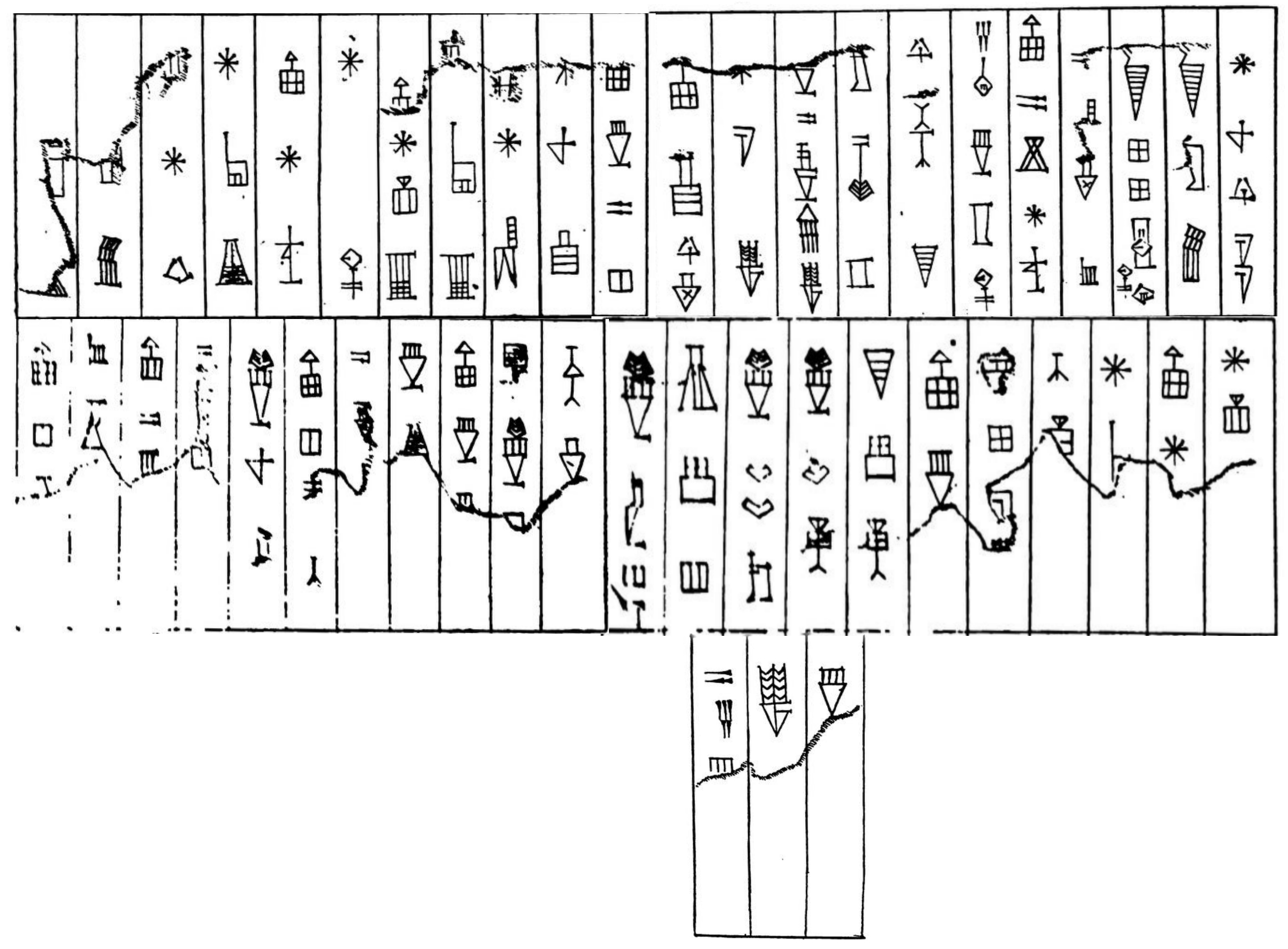
Transcription

Anubanini, the mighty king, king of Lullubum, erected an image of himself and an image of Goddess Ninni on the mount of Batir... (follows a lengthy curse formula invoking deities Anu, Antum, Enlil, Ninlil, Adad, Ishtar, Sin and Shamash towards anyone who would damage the monument)

— Akkadian language inscription of the Anubanini relief.

The date of the rock relief is believed to be circa 2300 BC. It was damaged about 30% during the Iran-Iraq War. Older photographs show in particular a nearly undamaged figure of the king.

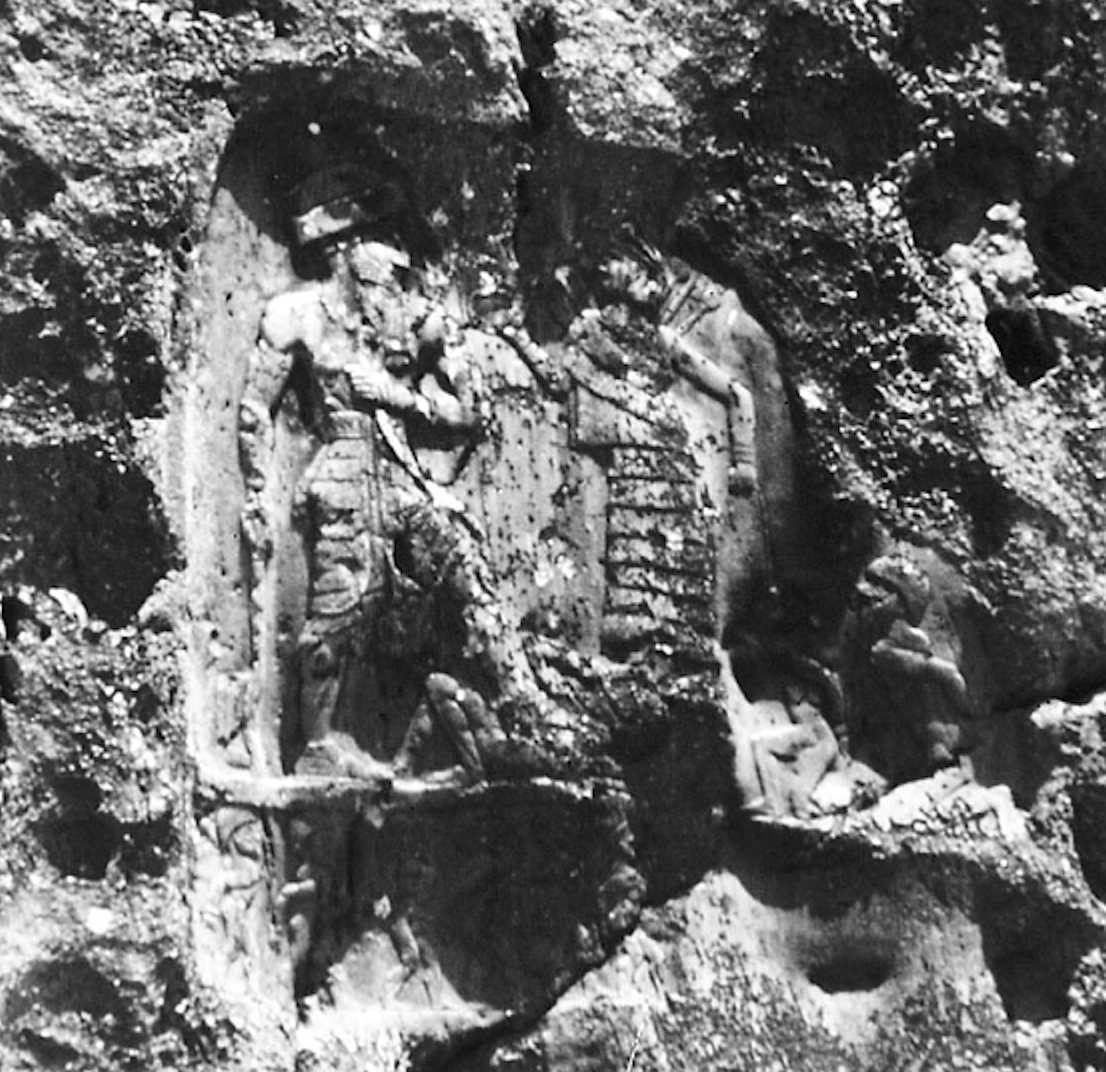
Photograph by Ernst Herzfeld

== Behistun reliefs ==
This rock relief is very similar to the much later Achaemenid Behistun reliefs (5th century BC), not located very far, to such an extent that it was said that the Behistun Inscription was influenced by it. The attitude of the ruler, the trampling of an enemy, the presence of a divinity, the lines of prisoners are all very similar.

== Details of the relief ==
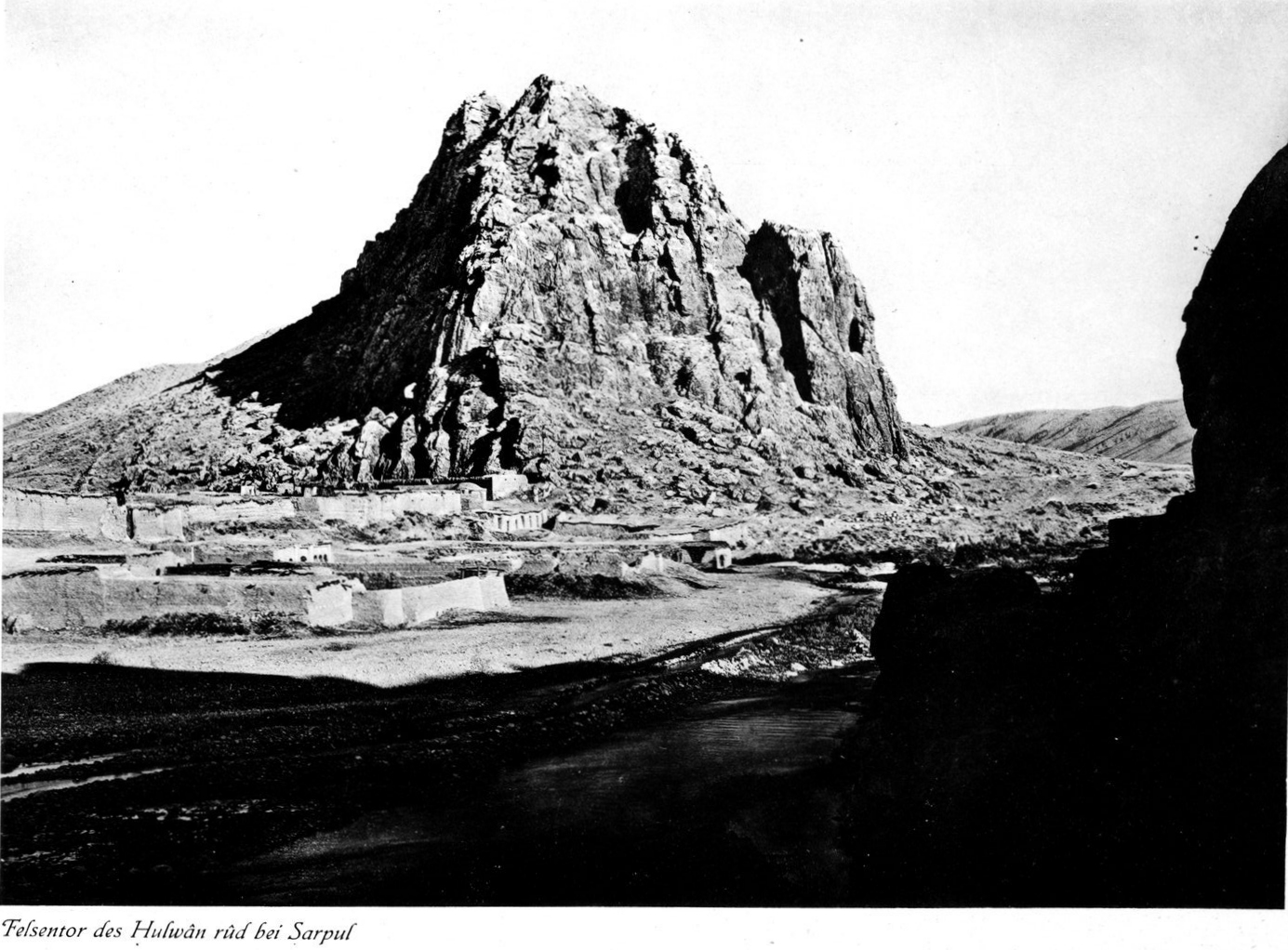
The Sarpul mountain, on which the relief is located (in the shadow of the edge closest to the camera). The city of Sarpul lays at the foot of the mountain.

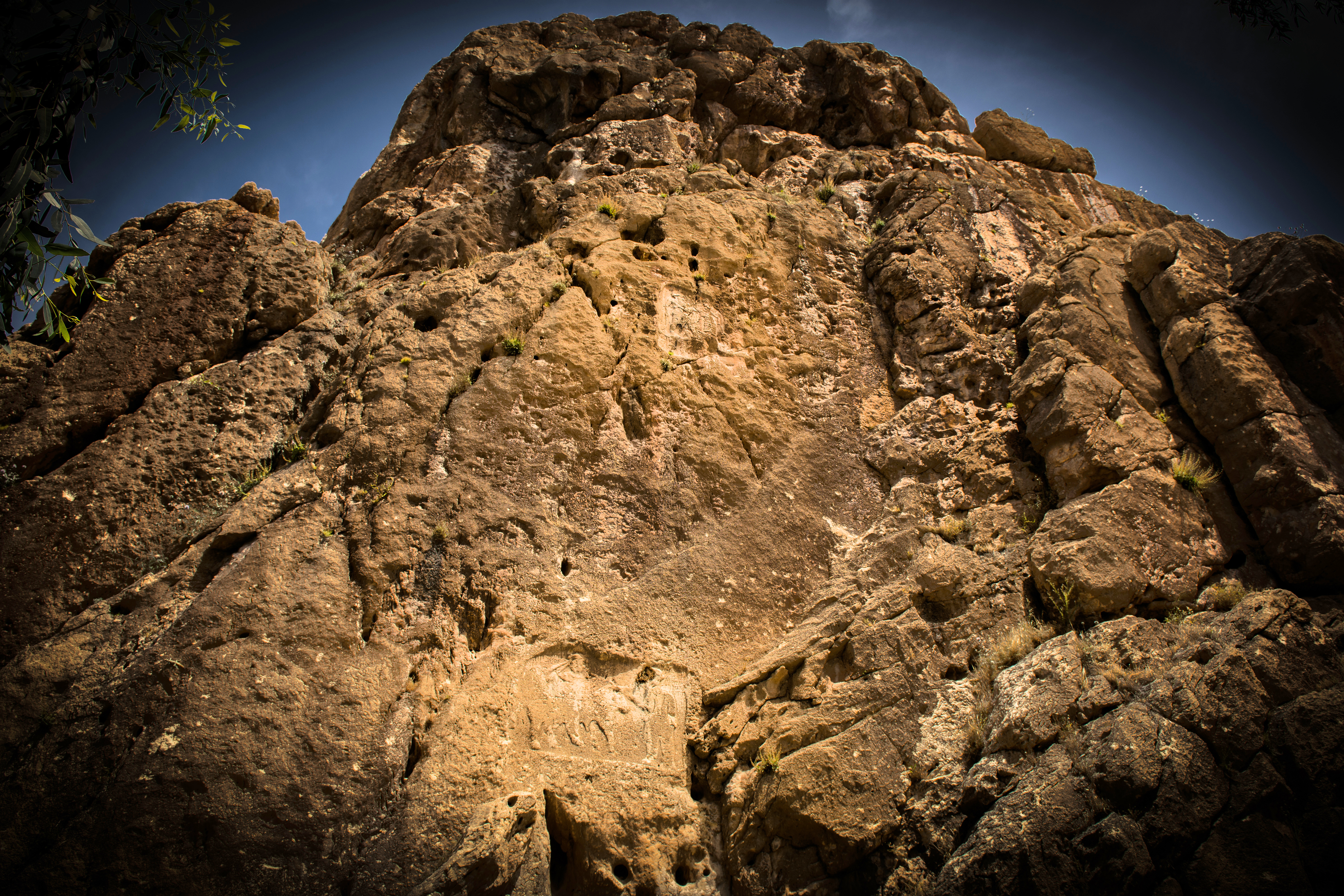
The relief is located at a height of 16 meters, on the top of a cliff towering over the village of Sarpol-e Zahab. A second relief (relief of Gotarzes II, Parthian Empire) appears below.

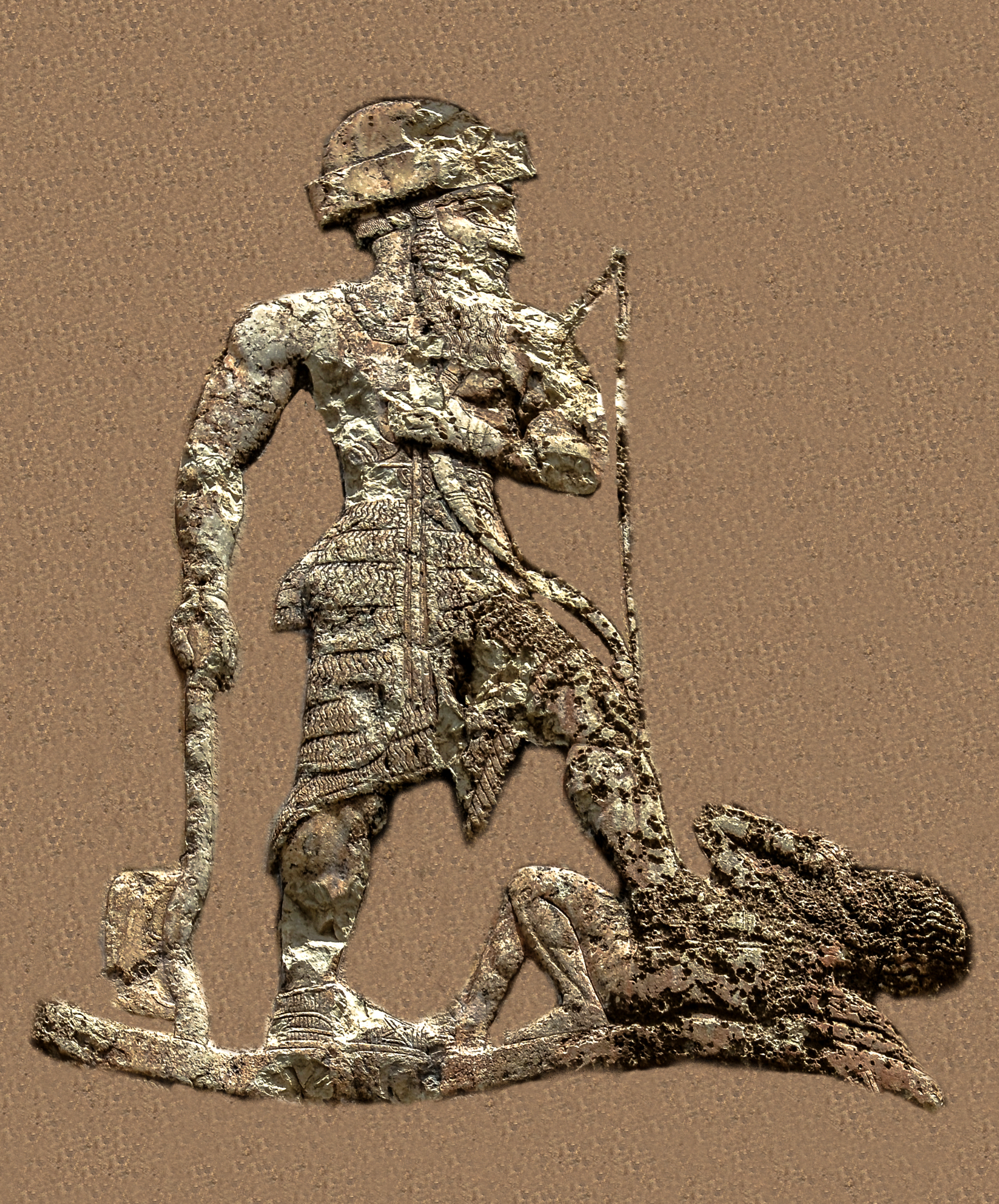
King Anubanini. He is equipped with an axe, a bow and an arrow. He is bare-chested, wears a short skirt, a roll-brimmed hat and sandals.

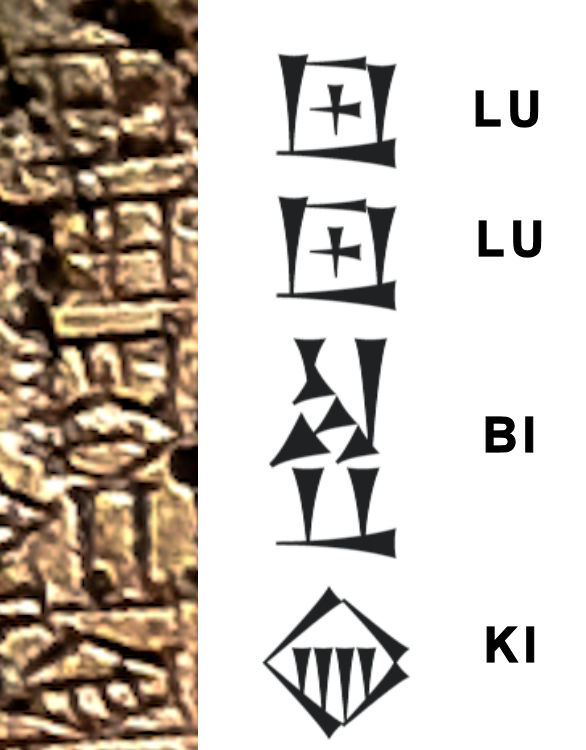
Lullubi-ki ("Country of the Lullubi") on the Anubanini Rock Relief

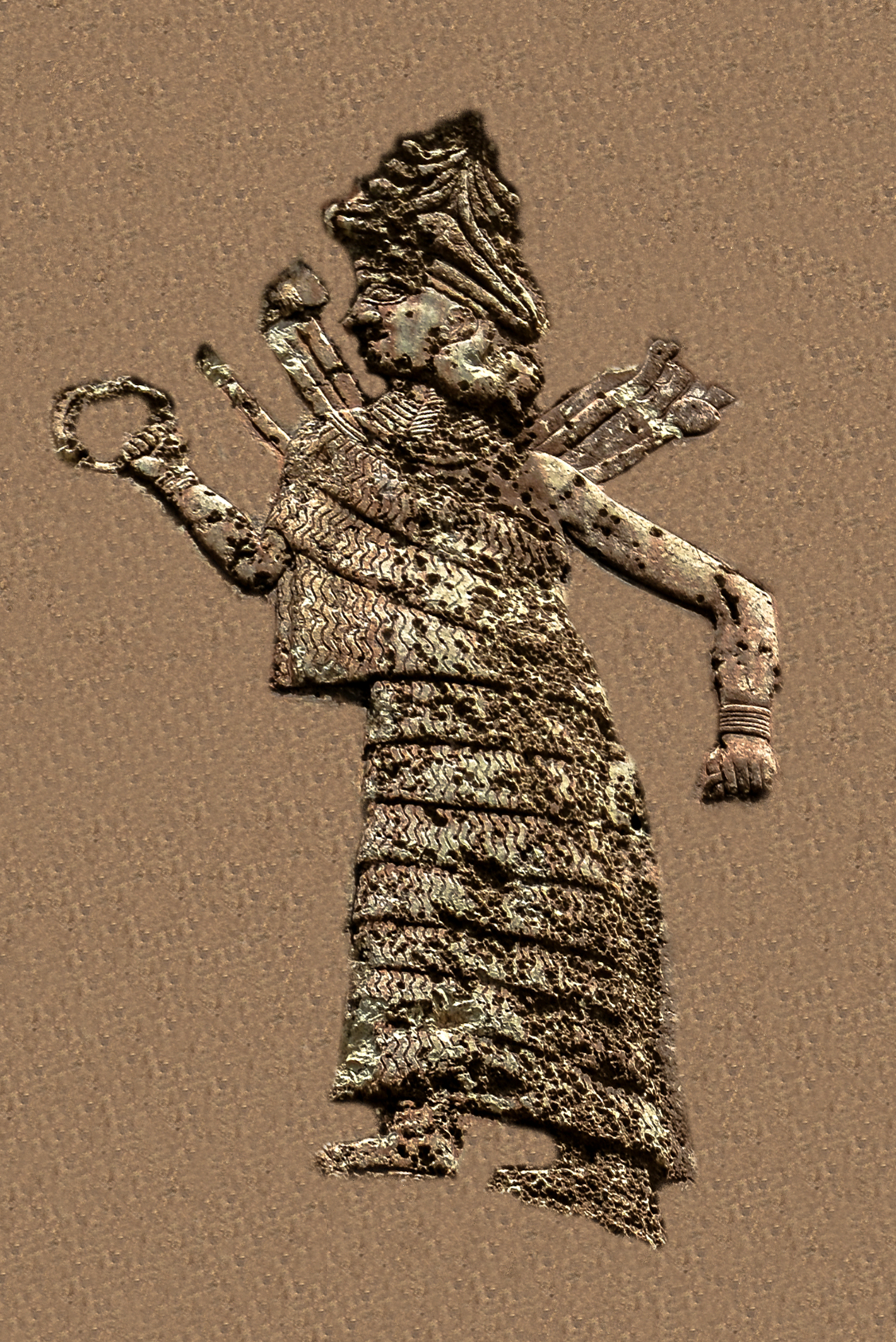
Goddess Ishtar/Inanna. She wears a long, flounced dress, a hat decorated with horns and a headed collar. She is extending a ring in her right hand and has club-like weapons in her back.

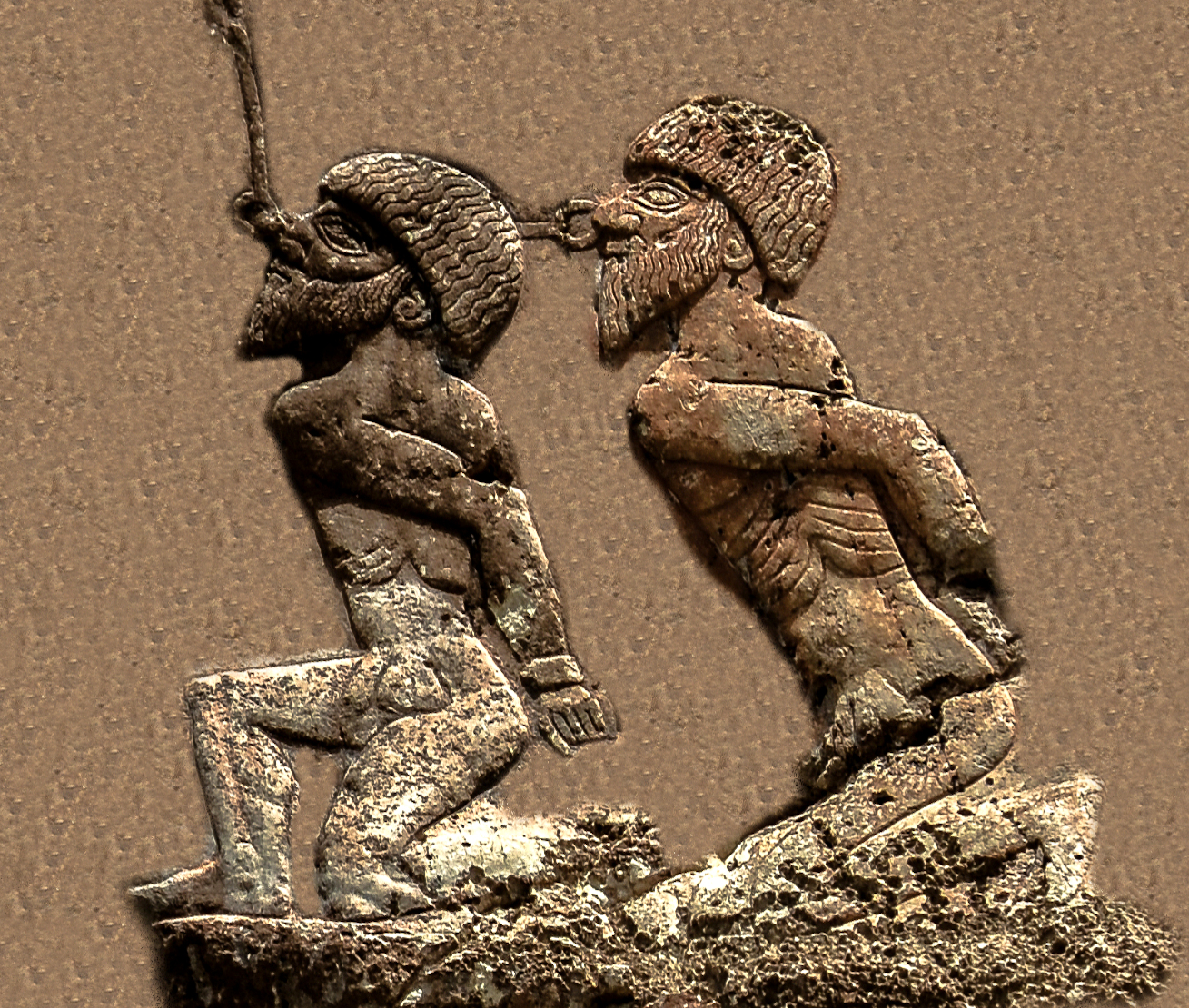
Prisoners of Anubanini, brought by Goddess Ishtar (detail). They are naked, their hands bound, and held by a ring through the nose.

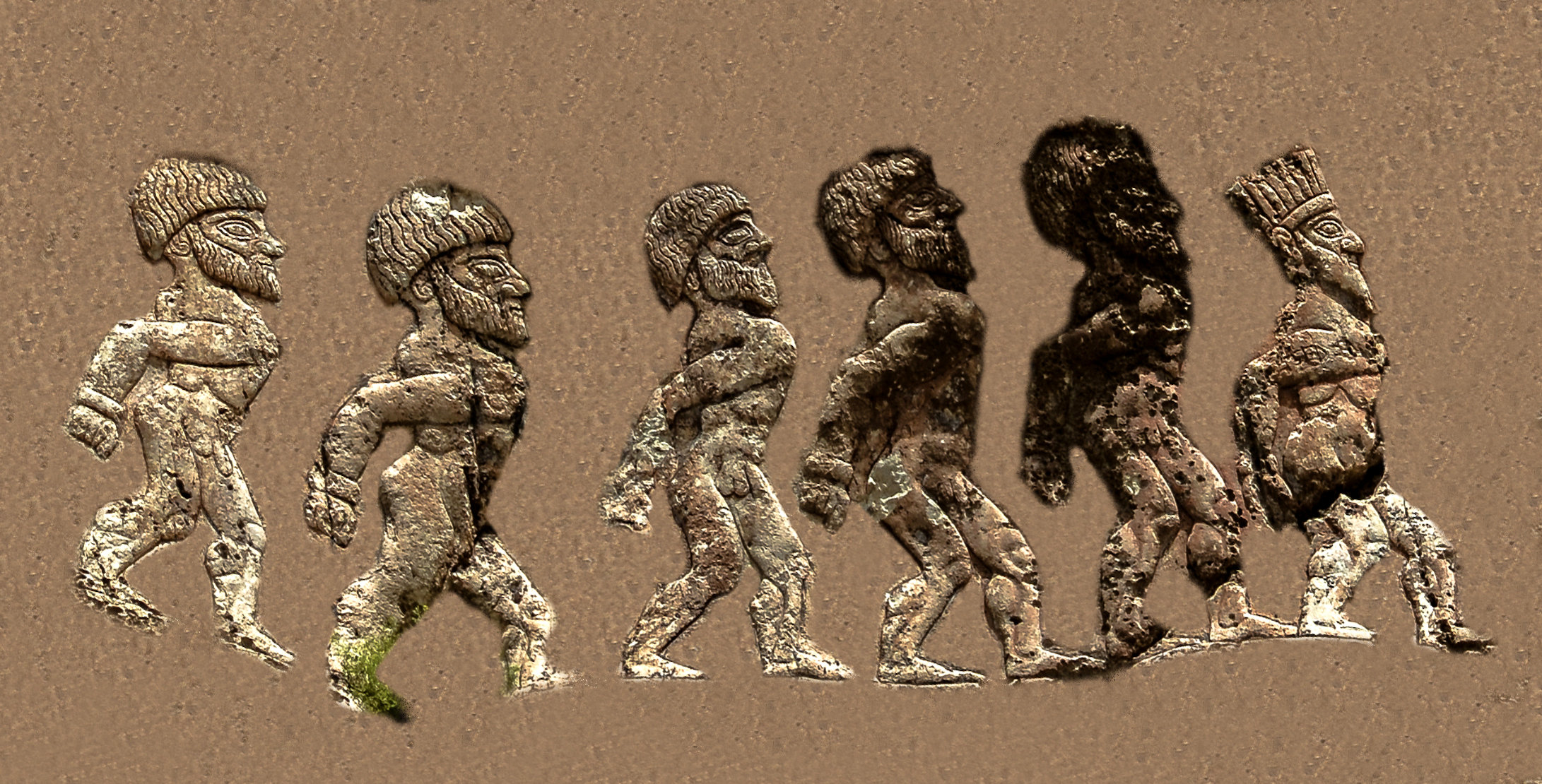
Prisoners and their king (detail)

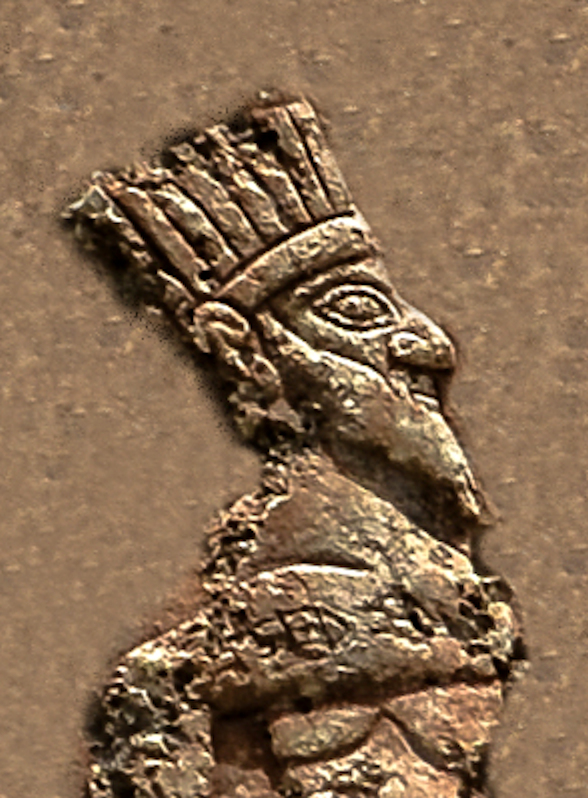
Depiction of a crown-wearing king, naked, imprisoned by Anubanini. This is possibly a feathered crown as seen on some bronzes of Luristan.

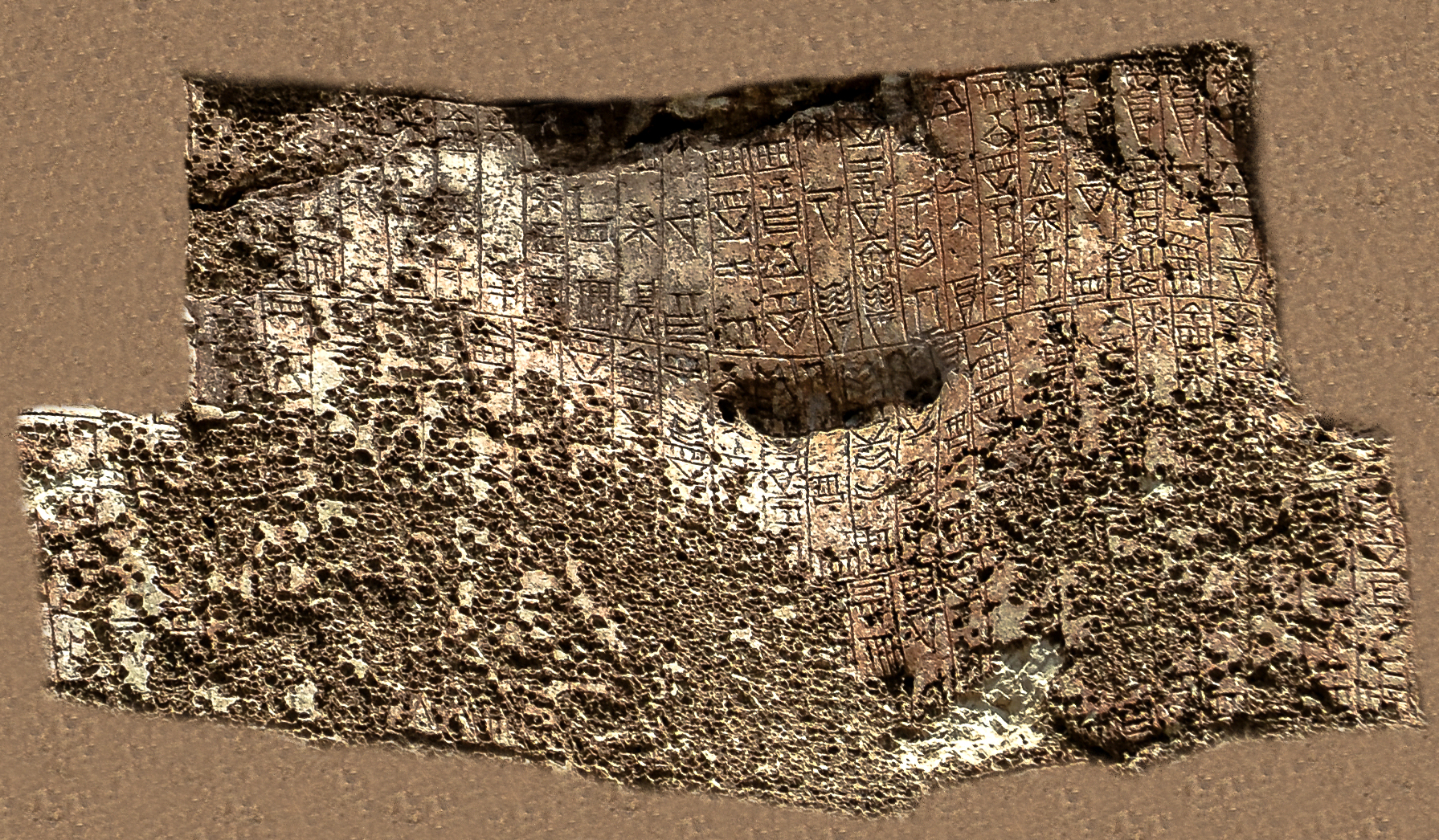
Anubanini rock relief Akkadian language and Akkadian script inscription

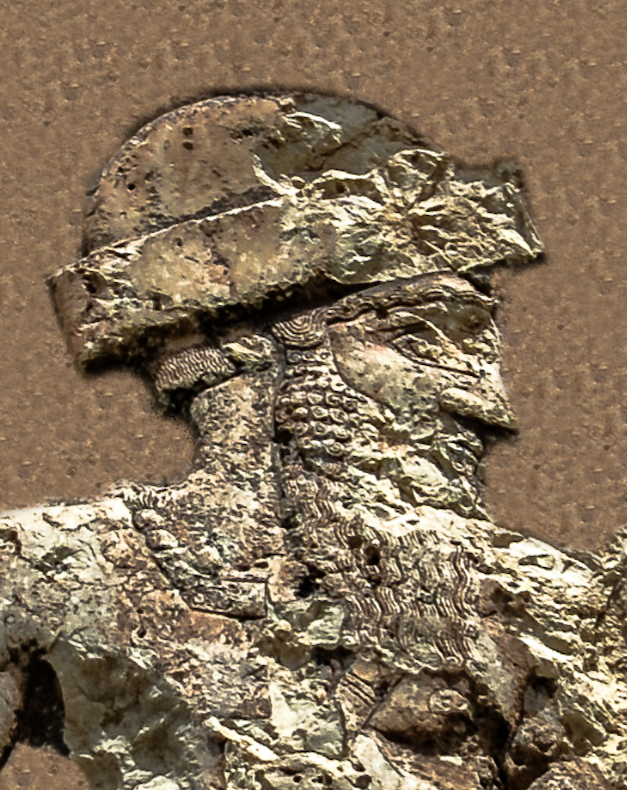
Portrait of King Anubanini

== Early depictions ==
The French architect Pascal Coste painted the rock relief as early as 1840.

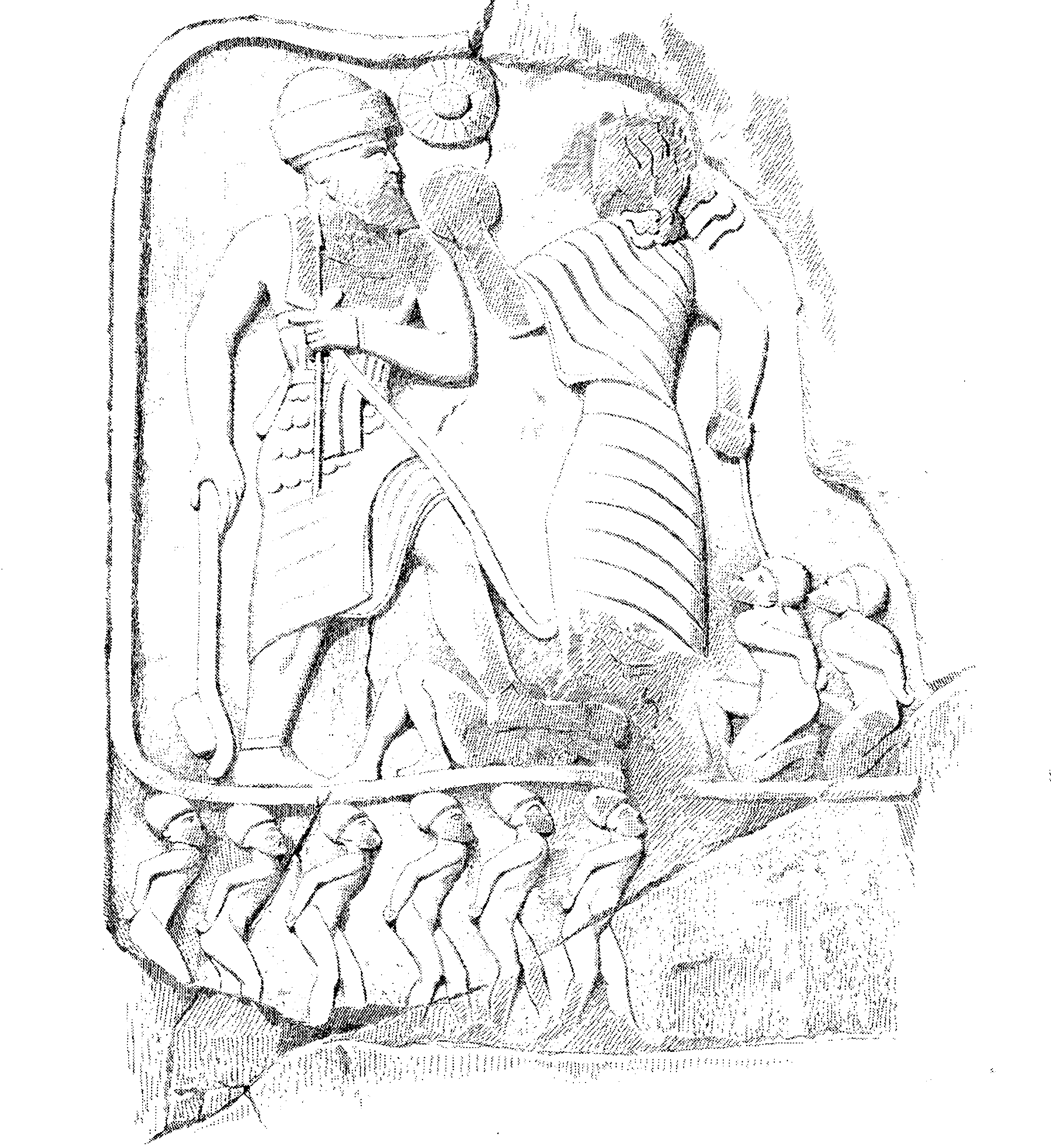
Drawing by Pascal Coste

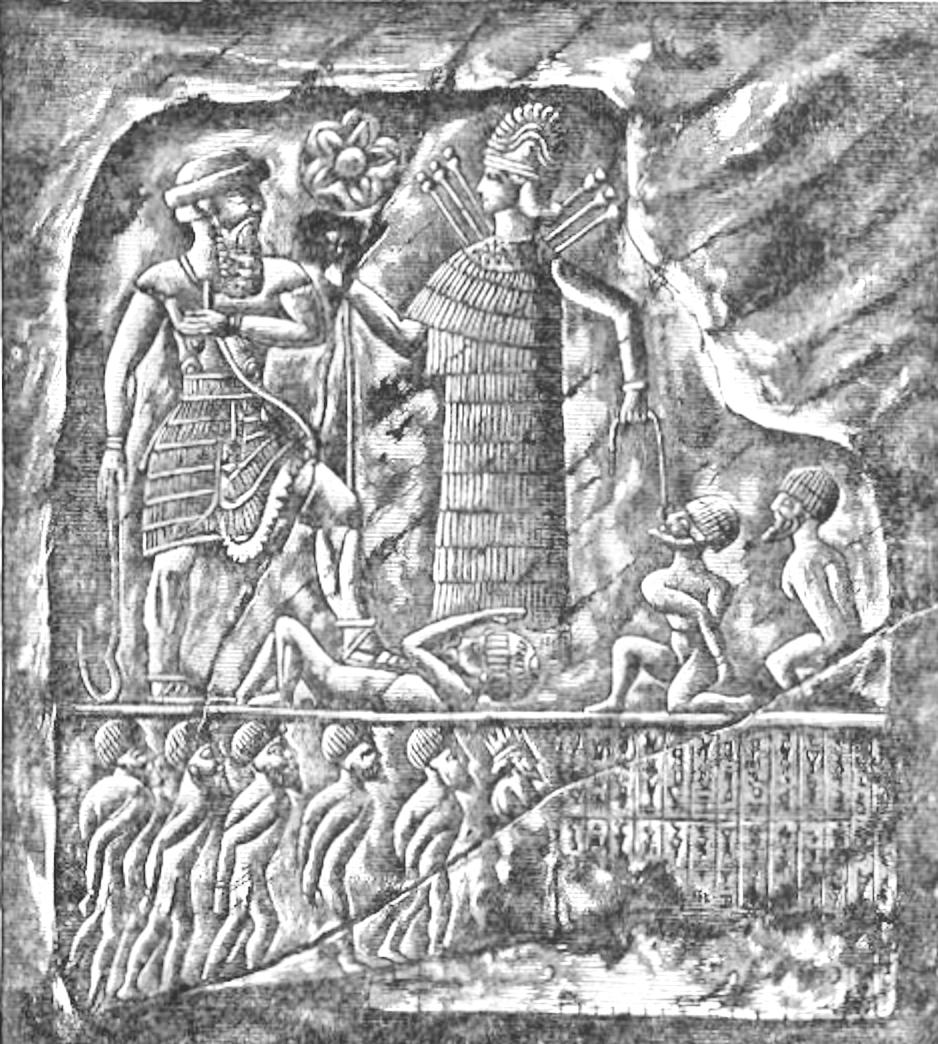
Anubanini rock relief woodprint

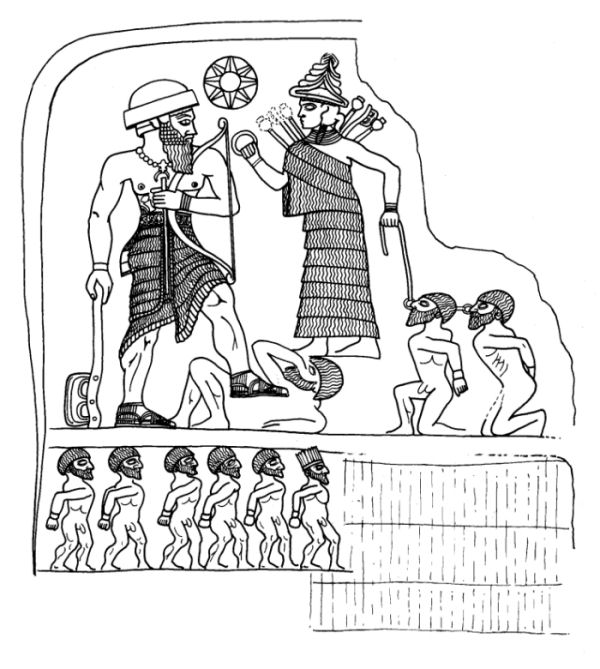
Modern drawing of the relief

== Other reliefs in the area ==
The same area of Sar-e Pol-e Zahab, has three more, less well-preserved reliefs.

=== Lullubian reliefs ===
Another relief named Sar-e Pol-e Zohab I is about 200 meters away, in a style similar to the Anubanini relief, but this time with a beardless ruler. The attribution to a specific ruler remains uncertain. There are also other Lullubian relief in the same area of Sar-e Pol-e Zahab, showing a beardless warrior trampling a foe, facing a goddess.

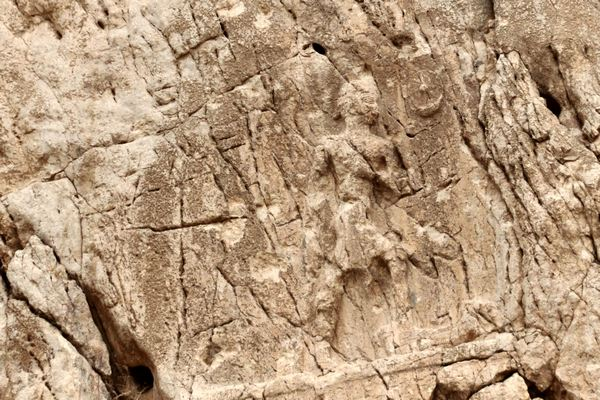
Sarpol-e Zahab, relief I. Beardless warrior with axe, trampling a foe. Sundisk above. A name "Zaba(zuna), son of ..." can be read. He is usually considered as a ruler of the Lullubi, but he could be a ruler of the Kingdom of Simurrum, son of Iddin-Sin.

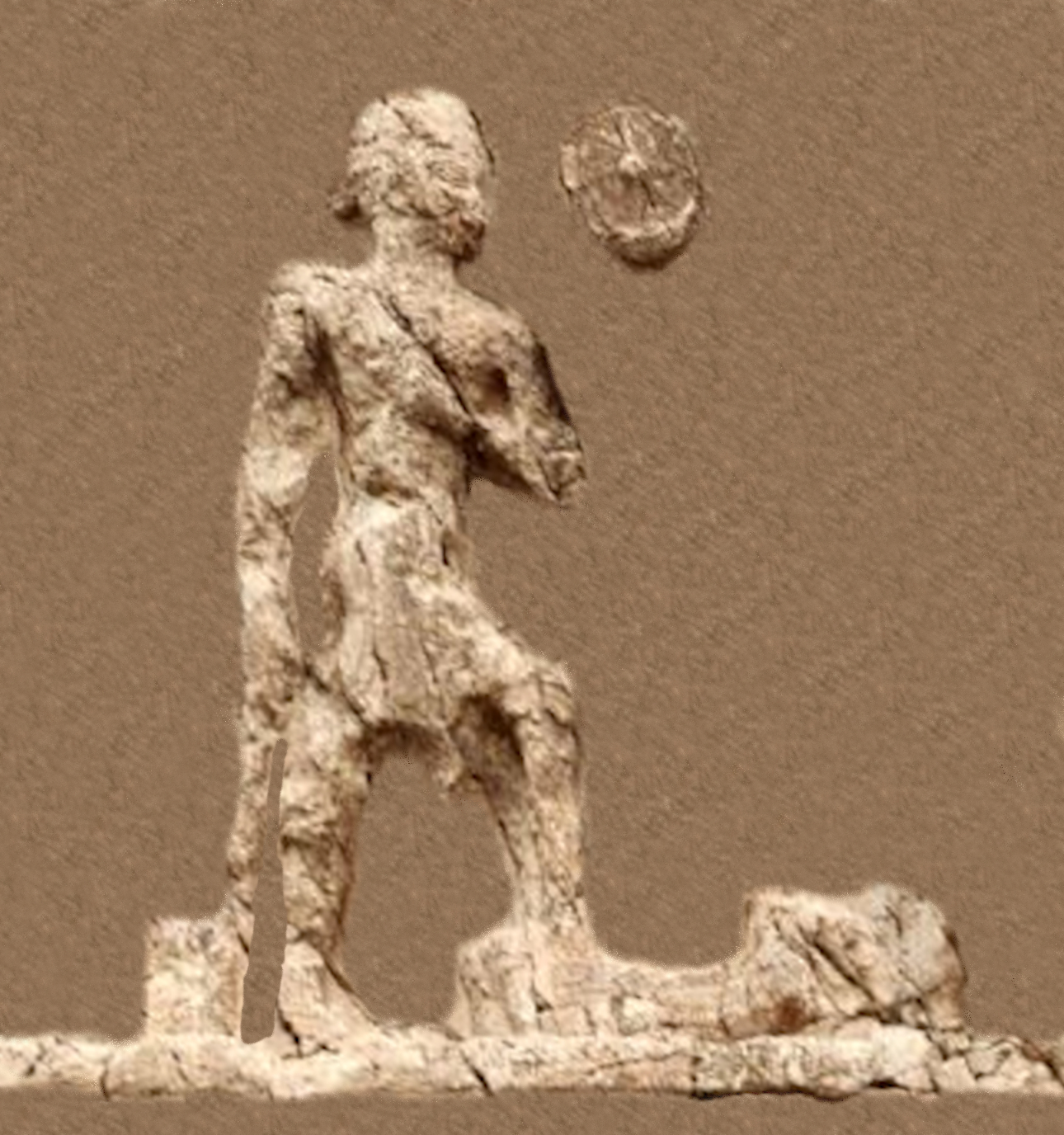
Outline of relief I (extracted). Beardless warrior with axe, trampling a foe. Sundisk above. A name "Zaba(zuna), son of ..." can be read.

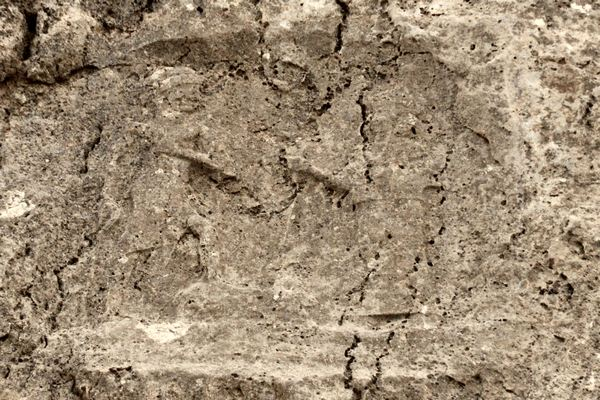
Sar-e Pol-e Zahab, relief III. Beardless warrior trampling a foe, facing a goddess.

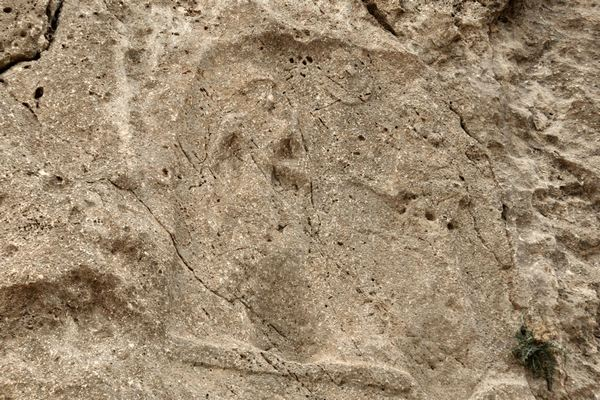
Sar-e Pol-e Zahab, relief IV. Beardless warrior trampling a foe, facing a goddess.

=== Parthian relief ===
Another relief is located below the Anubanini relief, lower on the cliff. This relief was created during the Parthian Empire in the name of Gotarzes, possibly Gotarzes I, but more probably the Parthian king Gotarzes II, who ruled from 39 to 51 CE and is known to have made other reliefs, such as the equestrian relief at Behistun.

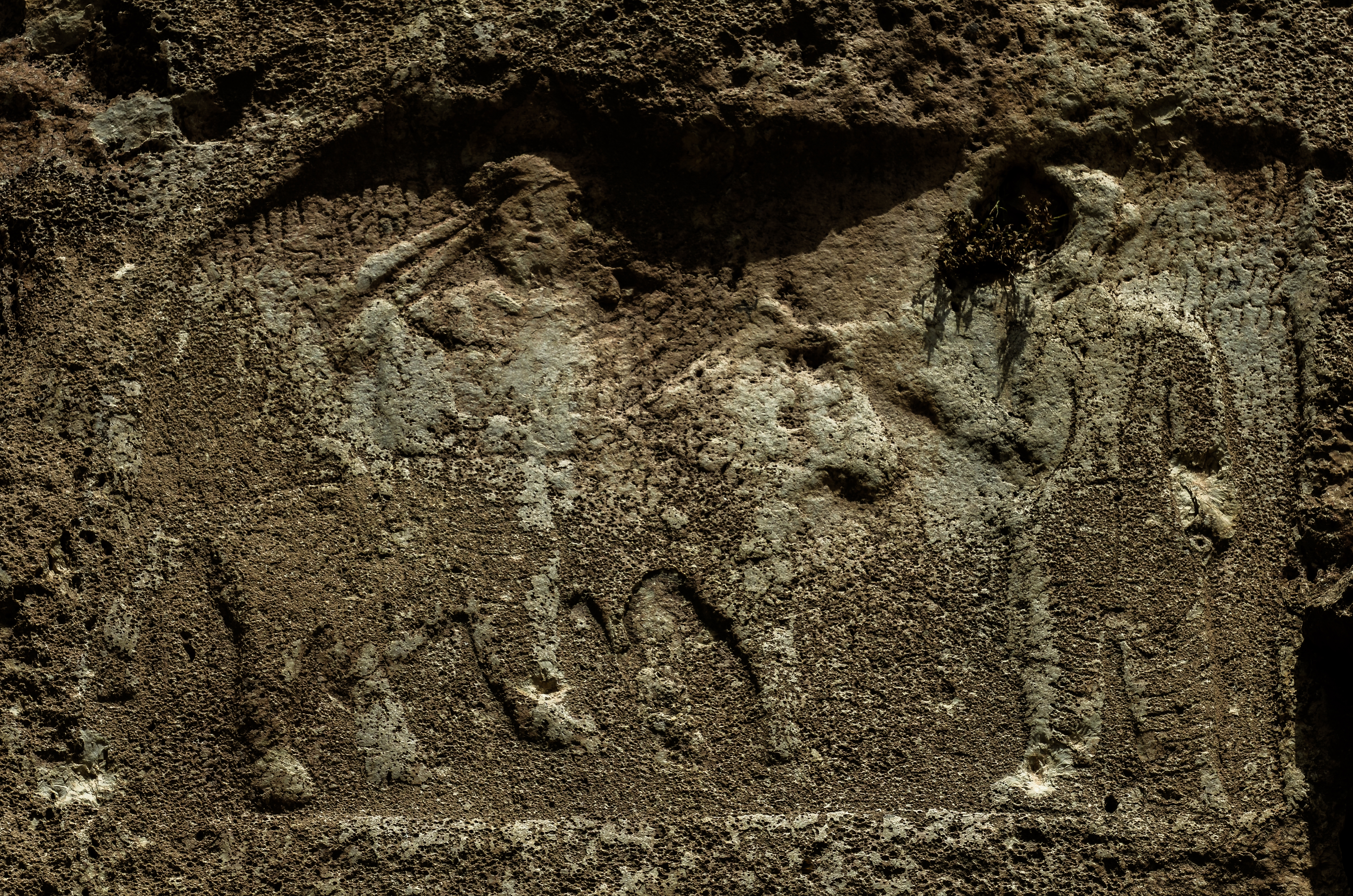
The second relief, below the Anubanini relief, a Parthian relief

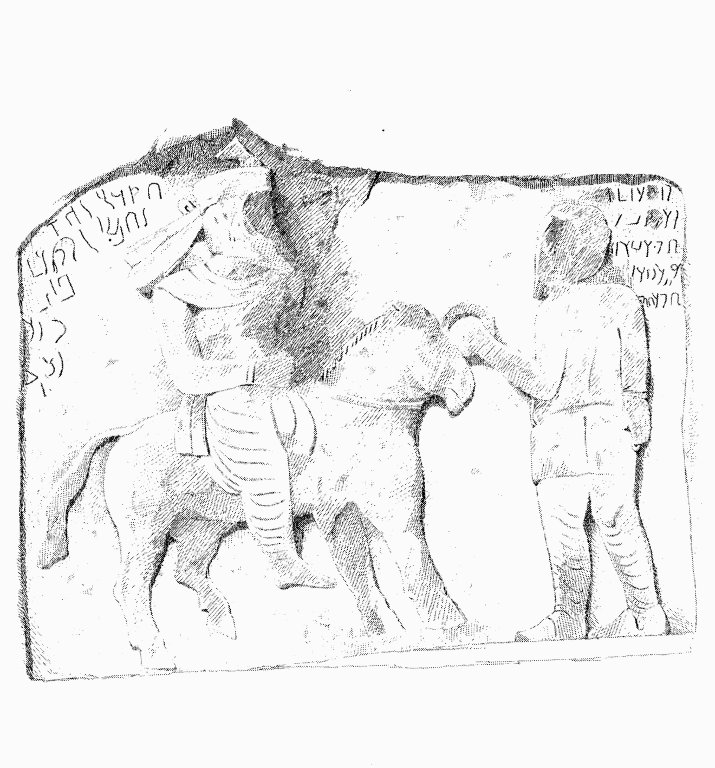
Drawing of the Parthian relief

=== Dukkan-e Daud Late Achemenid tomb ===
At Dukkan-e Daud, not far from Sar-e Pol-e Zohab, there is a late Achaemenid tomb (circa 400–300 BCE) with the relief of a Zoroastrian priest.

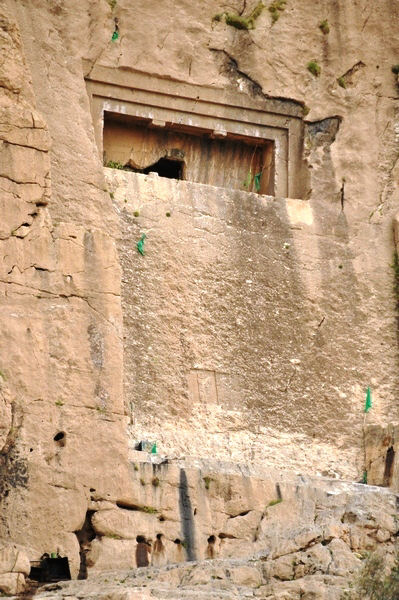

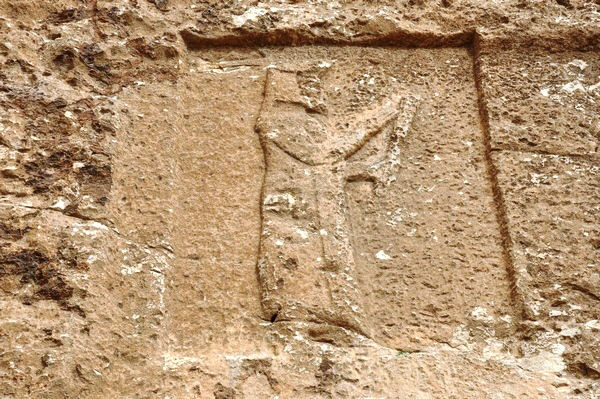

== See also ==
- Art of rock relief in ancient Iran
- Persian art
- Lullubi
- Anubanini
