= Dukkan-e Daud =

Ancient rock tomb in Iran

- دکان داوود (Persian)
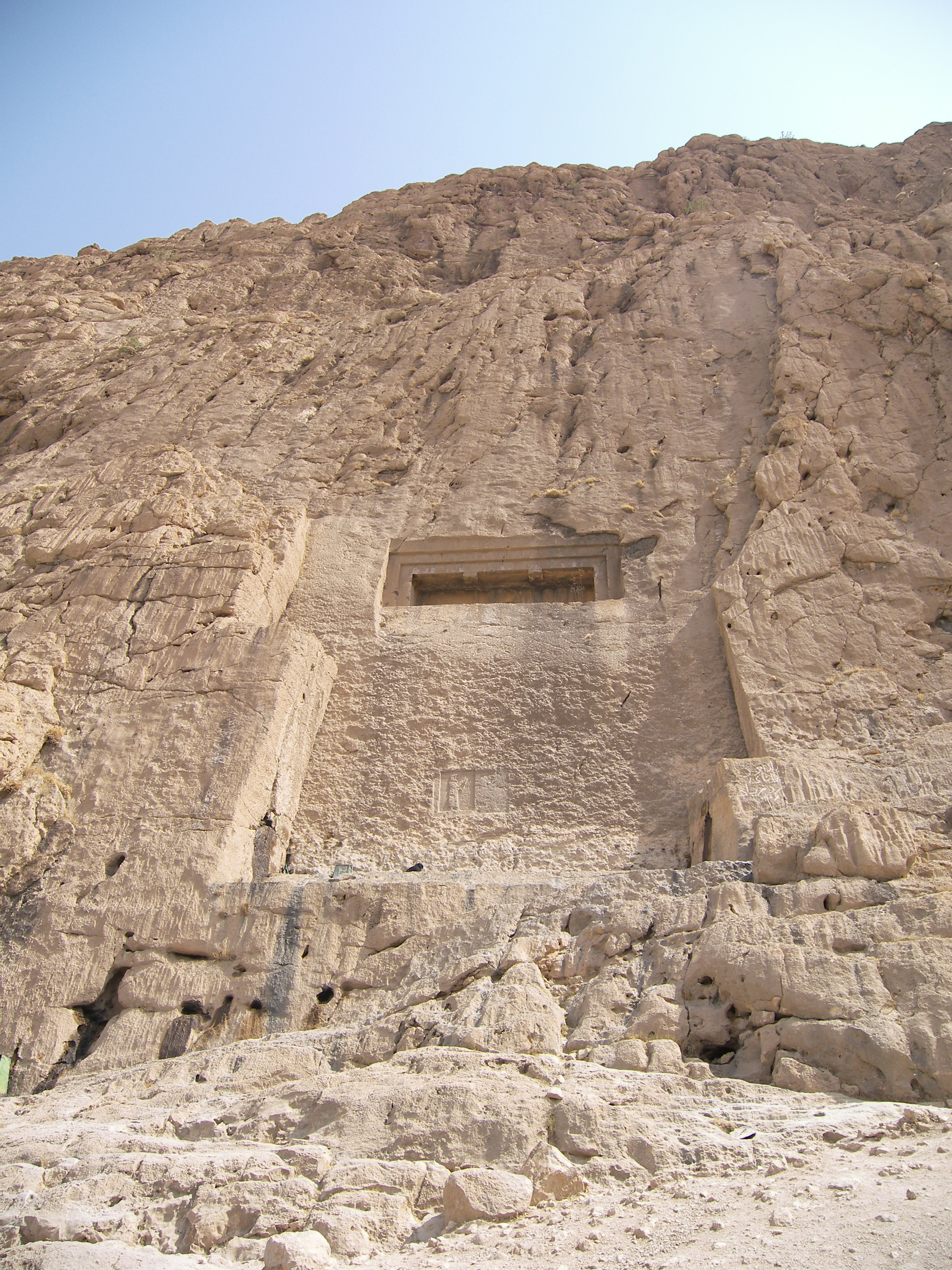
- Dukkan-e Daud

- Location within Near East
- Type: Rock tomb
- Cultures: Achaemenid
- Location: Near Sarpol-e Zahab, Kermanshah Province, Iran

Iran National Heritage List
- Official name: Dokkan-e Davud Rock Tomb
- Type: Rock Tomb
- Designated: 1932
- Reference no.: 152
- Conservation organization: Cultural Heritage, Handicrafts and Tourism Organization of Iran

Dukkan-e Daud (Persian: دکان داوود, lit. 'David's Store') is a late Achaemenid rock site located in the vicinity of Sarpol-e Zahab, Kermanshah Province, Iran. Henry Rawlinson visited this site in 1836. It consists of a rock tomb dug several meters high in a rock face overhanging a relief called Kil-e Daud (or David's tomb).

== The tomb ==
The tomb consists of a cavity opened by a wide and deep anteroom bordered by a double frame, held by 2 cylindrical columns whose shape resembles those of the Pasargadae palaces. The capital and the bases of the columns alone remain, having the form of tables. The southward tomb consists of a 1.95 m deep and 2.60 m high antechamber which is 9.60 m wide at the double frame of the entrance and 7.32 m wide at the back. In the middle of the back wall, a door leads into a rectangular, barrel-vaulted tomb chamber. The rectangular entrance to an arched room is decorated on one side with 5 niches that may have been used for lamps, and on the other with a larger niche for the body. The design of this tomb is similar to the design of other stone tombs located in Sahna, Qiz Qapan and Fakrika.

== The relief ==
The relief shows a priest wearing a Bashlick (a tapered cap with a pointed point projected forward) and holding a Barsom (staff of power) or a bundle of sacred twigs in the left hand. His right hand is raised as a sign of Zoroastrian ritual.

The post-Achaemenid reliefs, also called late Achaemenid, correspond to rock panels whose execution date is controversial. They were originally attributed to the Medes by Roman Ghirshman because of their locations corresponding to 12the old Media or Median style of dress. These reliefs were most probably carved in the 4th and 3rd centuries BC at the end of the Achaemenid period, or at the beginning of the Seleucid or even Parthian era. The authority of the Seleucids was actually exercised rather in Syria, upper Mesopotamia, and Asia Minor. It only extended to the western part of Iran, to towns on the main roads. Several provinces and most of the countryside therefore escaped Greek power. The reliefs made at this time therefore kept an Achaemenid style, and contains no trace of Hellenistic influence. Their execution is technically crude, attesting to a "provincial" character which clearly differentiates them from the official royal Achaemenid art in effect from Darius the Great until the fall of the Achaemenid Empire. But in reality, we have no certainty about who this tomb was built for or when. Modern archaeologists tend to date it to the Achaemenid or late Achaemenid period based on the chronology of the architectural style, while the primitive architectural style of this tomb could be a precursor to the architectural style of Achaemenid tombs, as Roman Ghirshman believes, and not vice versa, although we can never be sure, since stone structures without material culture or associated remains are difficult to date.

== Gallery ==
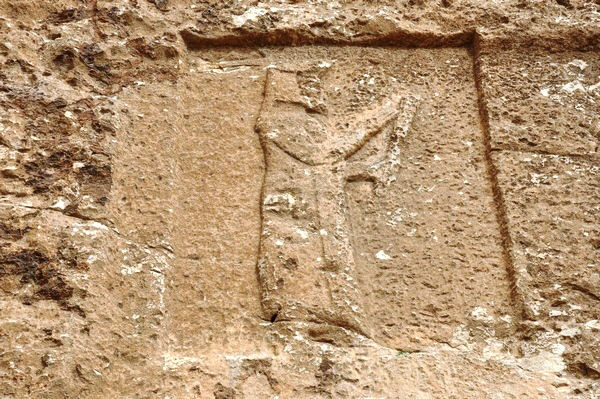
Tomb relief of priest

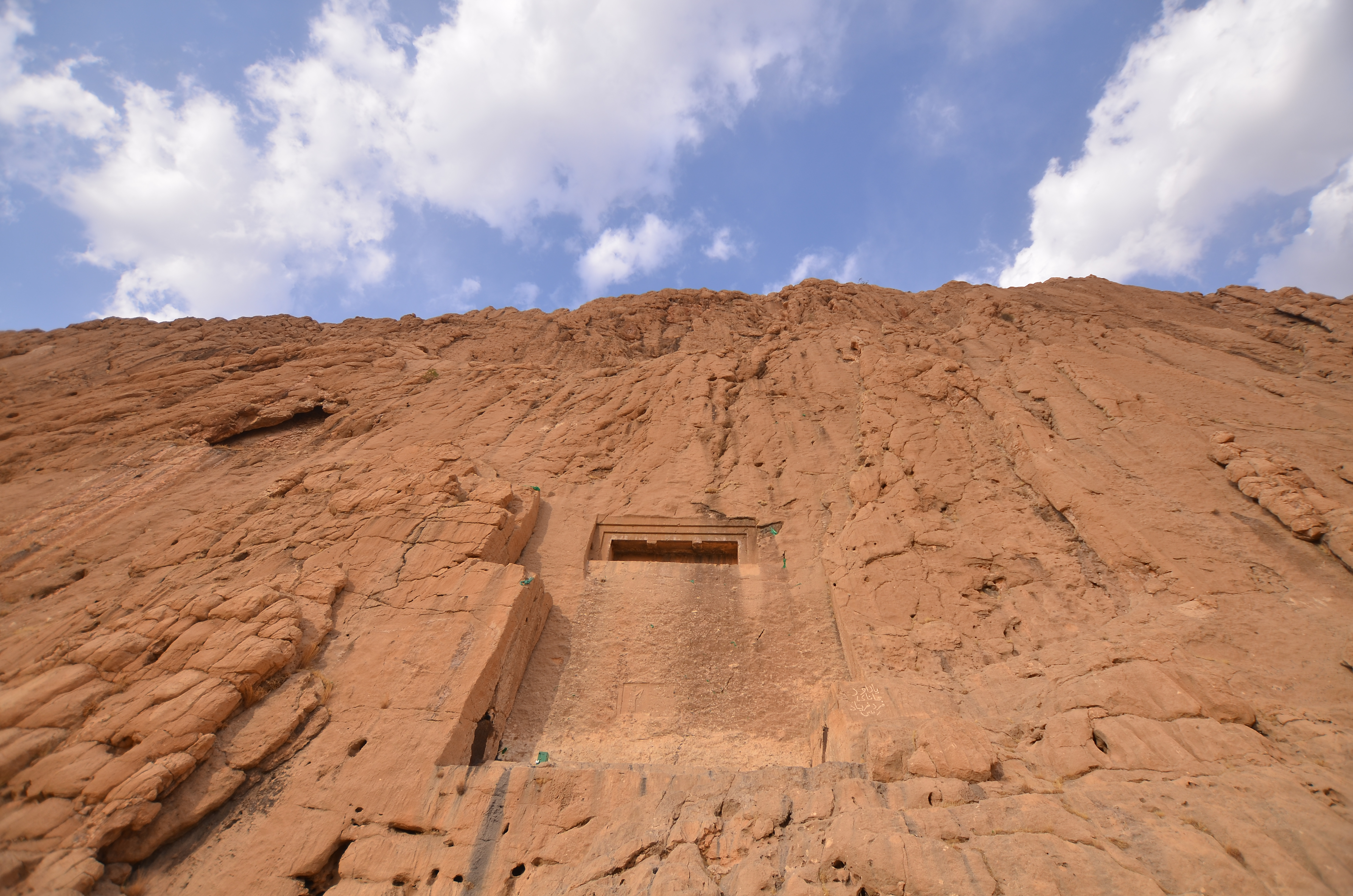
Ghale shahin

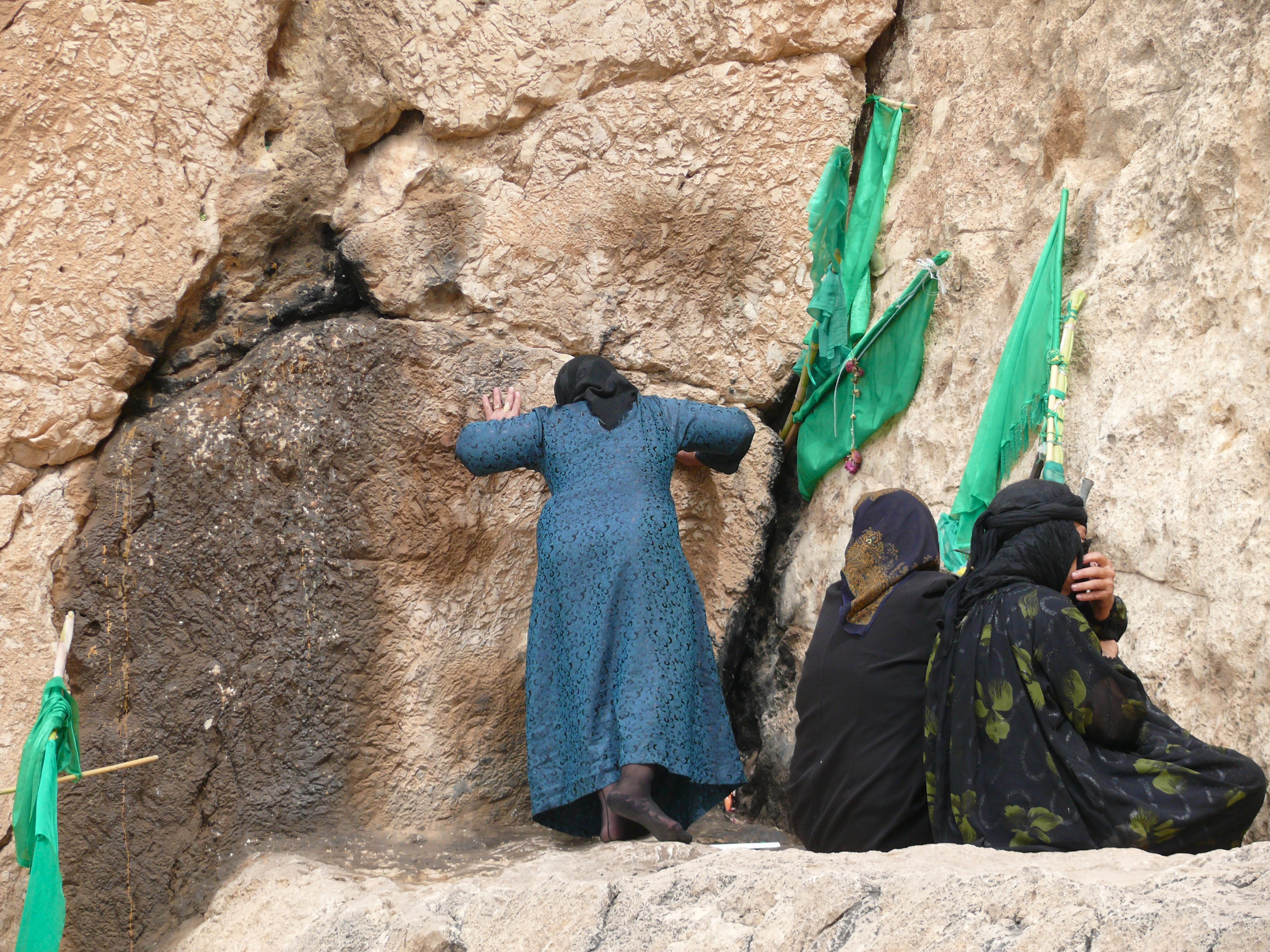
Praying at the site

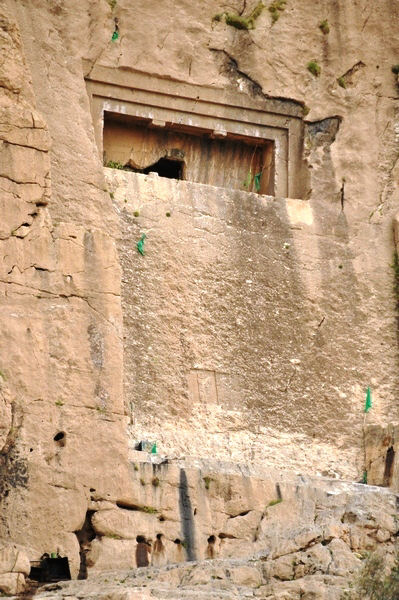
Kil-e Daud, or David's Tomb

== See also ==
- Essaqwand Rock Tombs
- Ravansar
