= Anubanini =

Pre-Iranian tribal king

Anubanini 𒀭𒉡𒁀𒉌𒉌
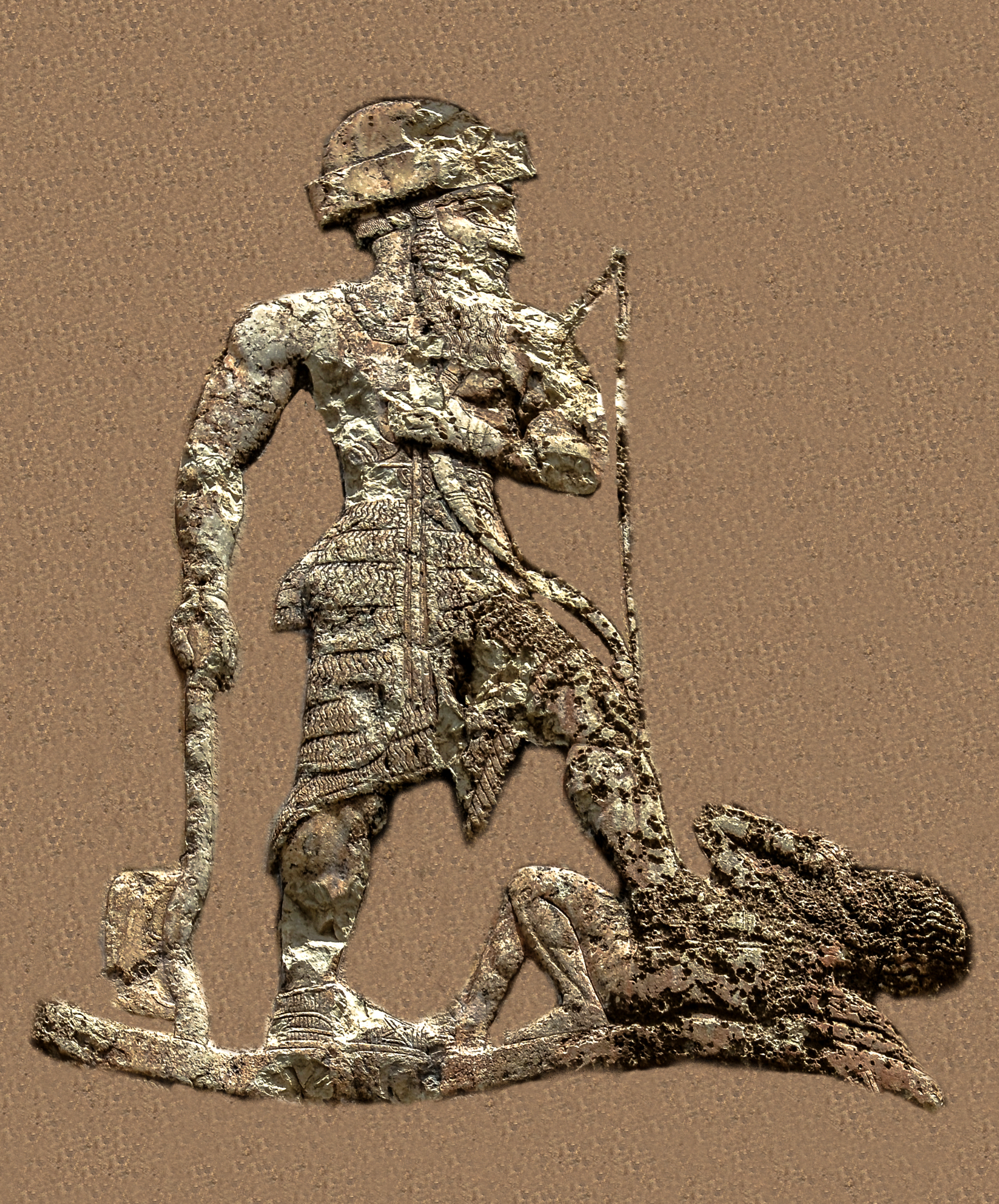
- Chief Anubanini of Lullubi, holding an axe and a bow, trampling a foe. Anubanini rock relief, c. 2300 BC. Sar-I Pul, Iran.
- Years active: c. 2300 BC

Location of the Anubanini rock relief

Anubanini, also Anobanini (Akkadian: 𒀭𒉡𒁀𒉌𒉌: An-nu-ba-ni-ni; fl. c. 2300 BC), was a Chief (𒈗 Šàr, pronounced Shar) of the pre-Iranian tribal kingdom of Lullubi in the Zagros Mountains circa 2300 BC, or relatively later during the Isin-Larsa period of Mesopotamia, circa 2000-1900 BC. He is known especially from the Anubanini rock relief, located in Kermanshah Province, Iran.

According to an inscription, Annubanini seems to have been contemporary with Simurrum king Iddin-Sin. Another well-known Lullubi chief is Satuni, who was vanquished by the Mesopotamian king Naram-Sin around 2250 BC.

Some academics have suggested that Anubanini may be the basis for the legendary King Ninus of Greek historiography, as his inscription mentioning both the Mediterranean and the Persian Gulf, implies he considered himself the ruler of both, giving rise to legends around Ninus.

== Anubanini rock relief ==
In this rock relief, Anubanini, the king of the Lullubi, puts his foot on the chest of a captive. There are 8 other captives, two of them kneeled behind the Lullubian equivalent of the Akkadian goddess Ishtar (recognisable by the four pairs of horns on her headdress and the weapons over her shoulders) and six of them standing in a lower row at the bottom of the rock relief. He is faced by goddess Nini/Innana/Ishtar, and it is thought that he may have claimed divinity, like several rulers after the end of the Third Dynasty of Ur.

This rock relief is very similar to the Behistun Inscription and may have influenced it.

In the inscription in Akkadian script and language, he declares himself as the mighty king of Lullubium, who had set up his image as well as that of Ishtar on mount Batir, and calls on various deities to preserve his monument:

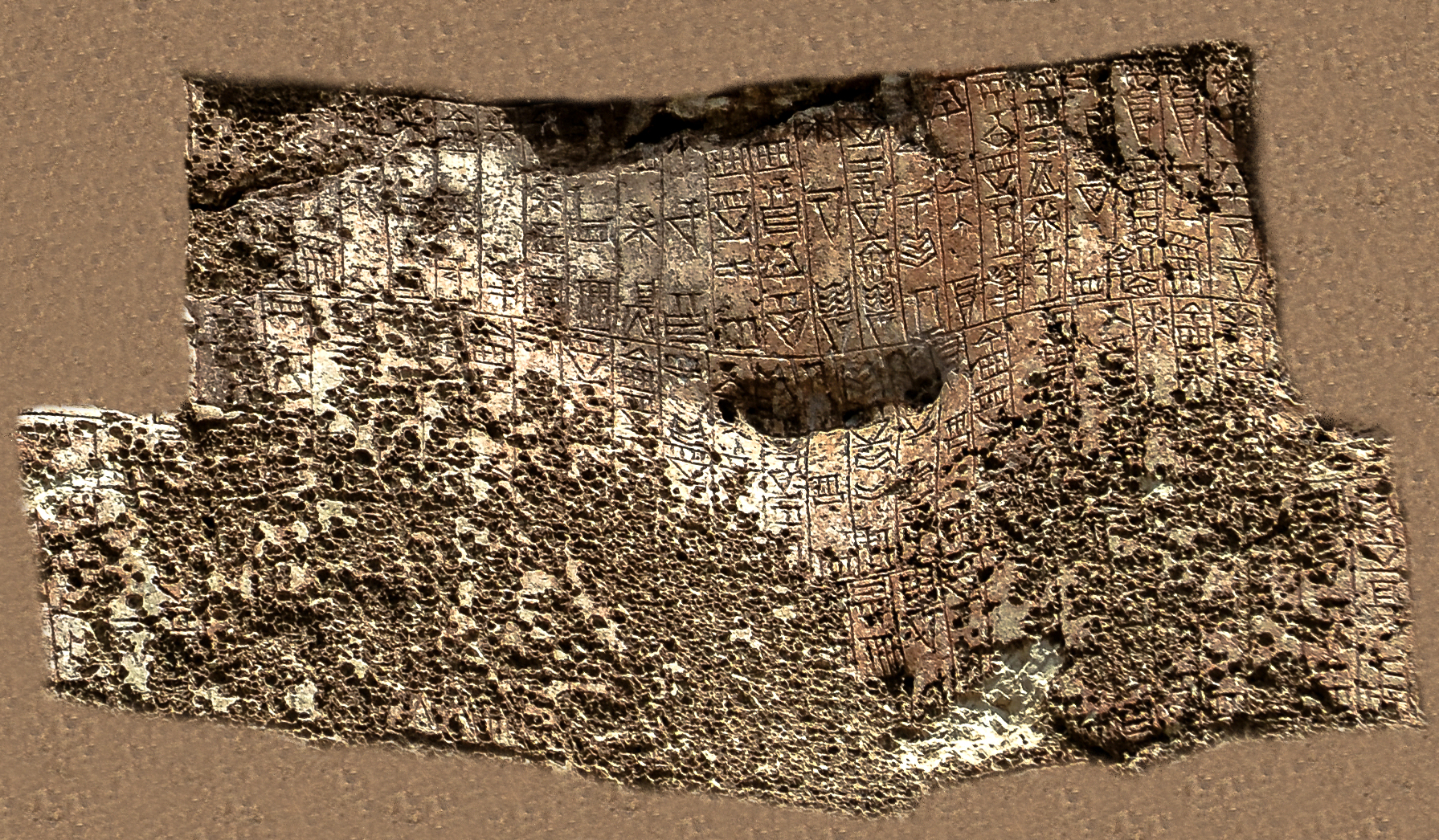

Anubanini, the mighty king, king of Lullubum, erected an image of himself and an image of Ishtar in the Mountains of Batir... (follows a lengthy curse formula invoking deities Anu, Antum, Enlil, Ninlil, Adad, Ishtar, Sin and Shamash to preserve his monument)

— Akkadian language inscription of the Anubanini relief.

== Raids on Guthium, Elam, and Babylonian territory ==
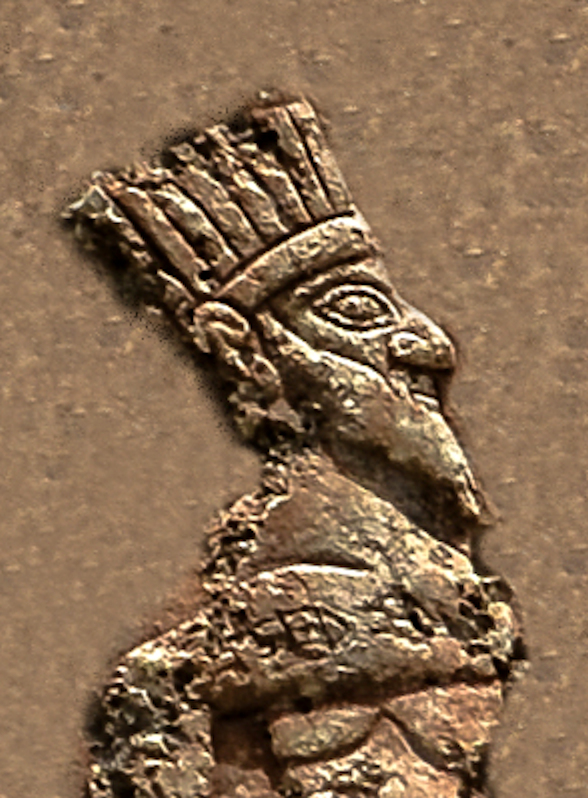
Depiction of a crown-wearing king, naked, imprisoned by Anubanini. This is possibly a feathered crown as seen on some bronzes of Luristan. Anubanini rock relief.

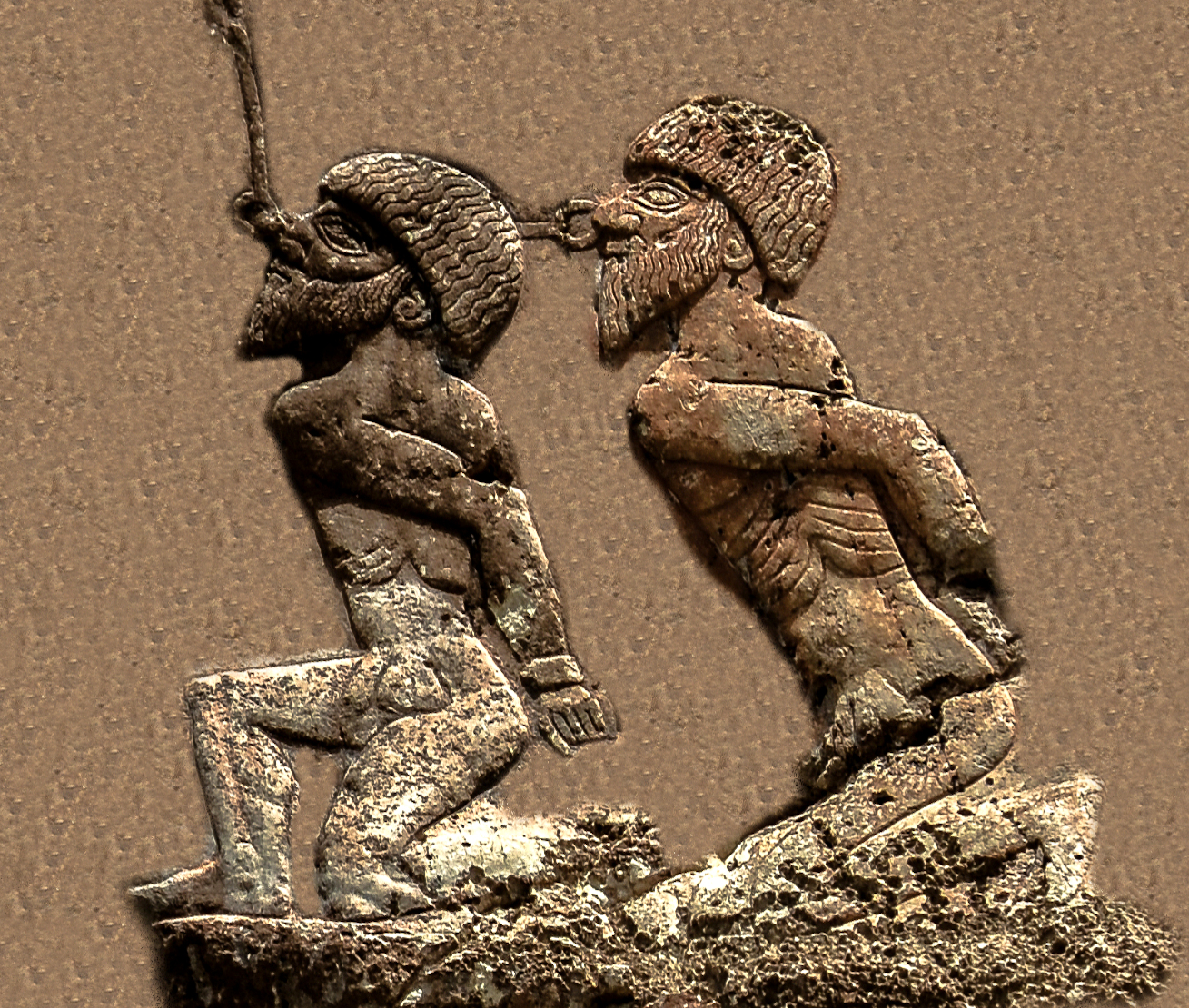
Prisoners of Anubanini, brought by Goddess Ishtar (detail). They are naked, their hands bound, and held by a ring through the nose. Anubanini rock relief.

Some later legends, such as the Cuthean Legend of Naram-Sin, describe a king Anubanini during the reign of Naram-Sin (c. 2254–2218 BCE), who used to raid the fertile lands of the Babylonian plain from his mountain territory on the eastern frontier. The epic Cuthean Legend of Naram-Sin claims Gutium and Elam among the lands raided by the hordes led by Anubanini. According to this account Anubanini was only stopped at the shores of the Persian Gulf.

"Warriors with bodies of “cave birds”, a race with ravens’ faces (...) in the midst of the Mountain they grew up, came to manhood and acquired their stature. Seven kings, brothers, glorious and noble, their troops numbered 360,000. Their father was Anubanini the king, their mother the queen, Melili was her name. (...) They devastated Gutium and invaded the land of Elam"

— The Cuthean Legend of Naram-Sin (extracts), translation Oliver Gurney.

== Depictions ==
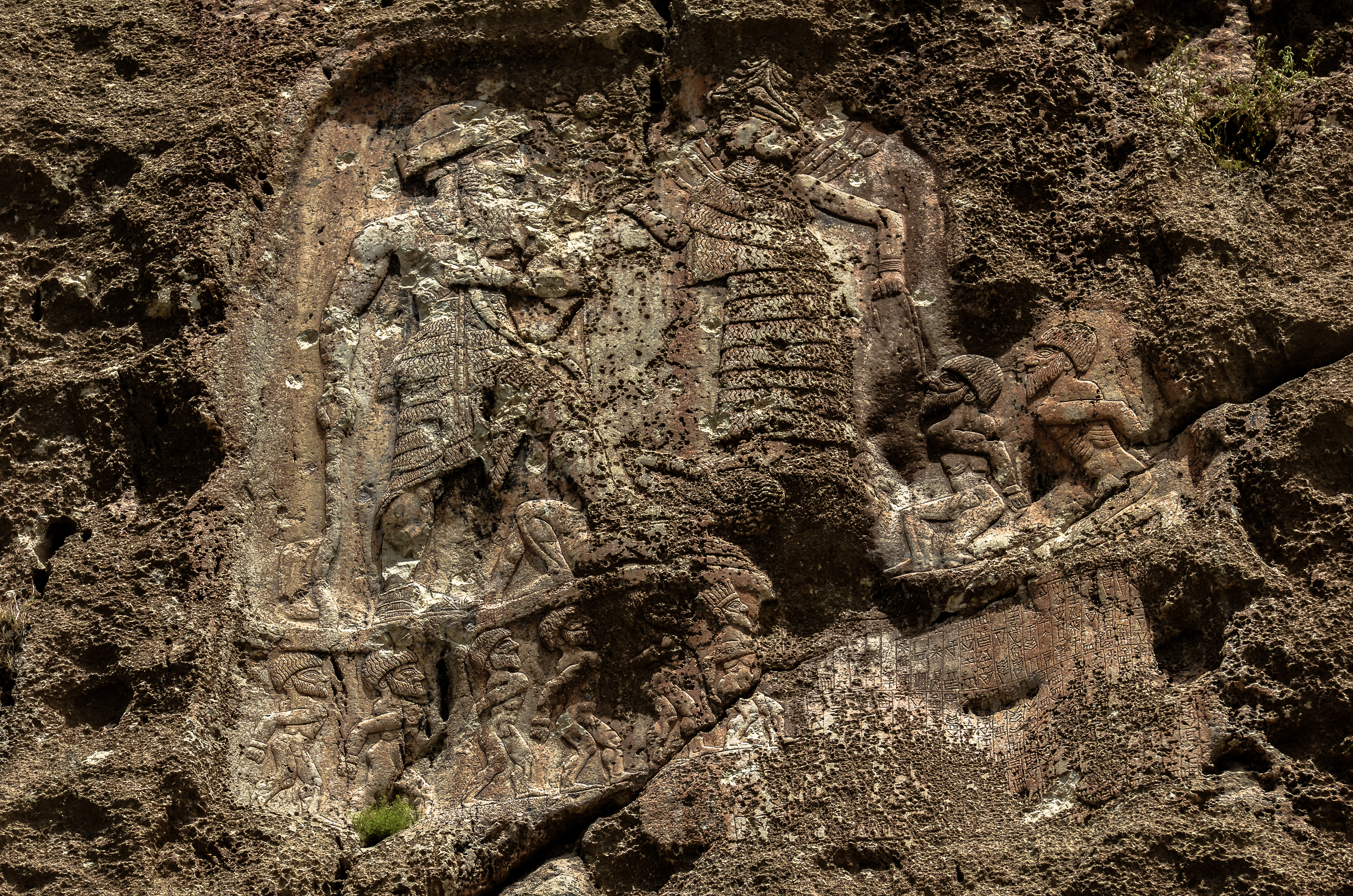
Original relief

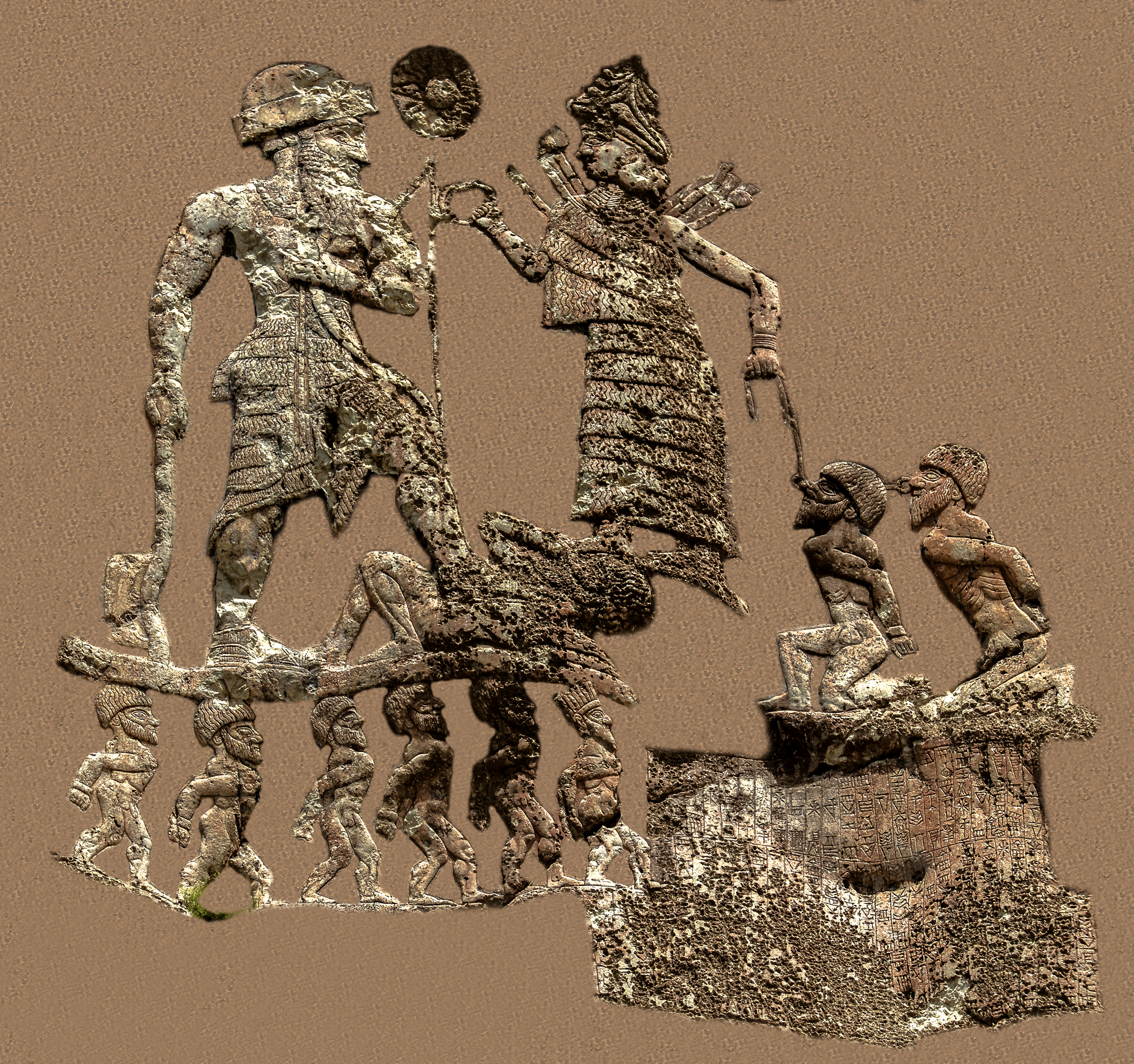
Components of the relief (extracted).

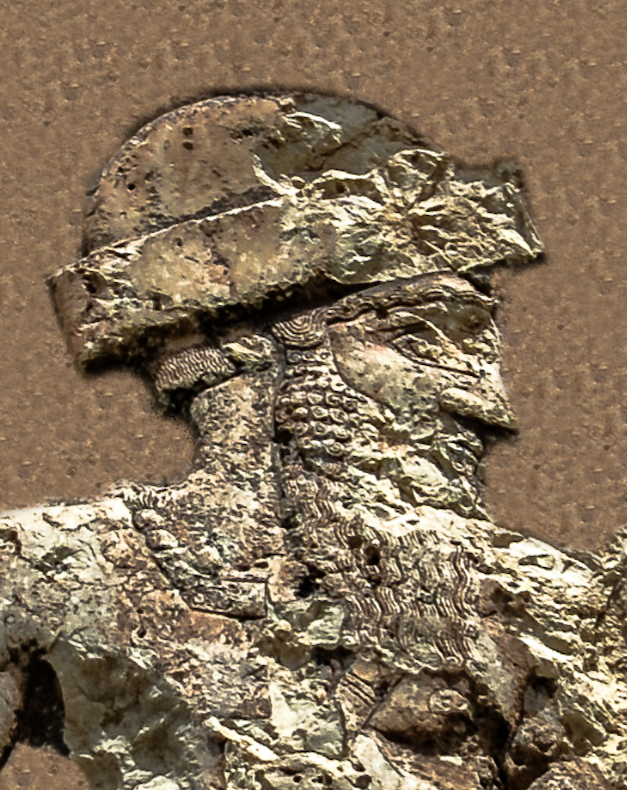
Portrait of king Anubanini

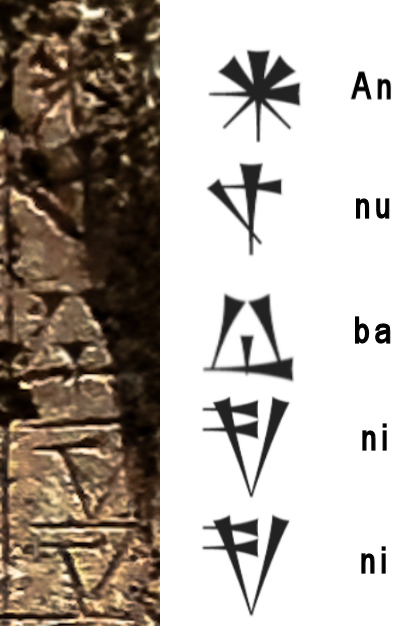
The name Annubanini as it appears at the beginning of the Anubanini rock relief inscription

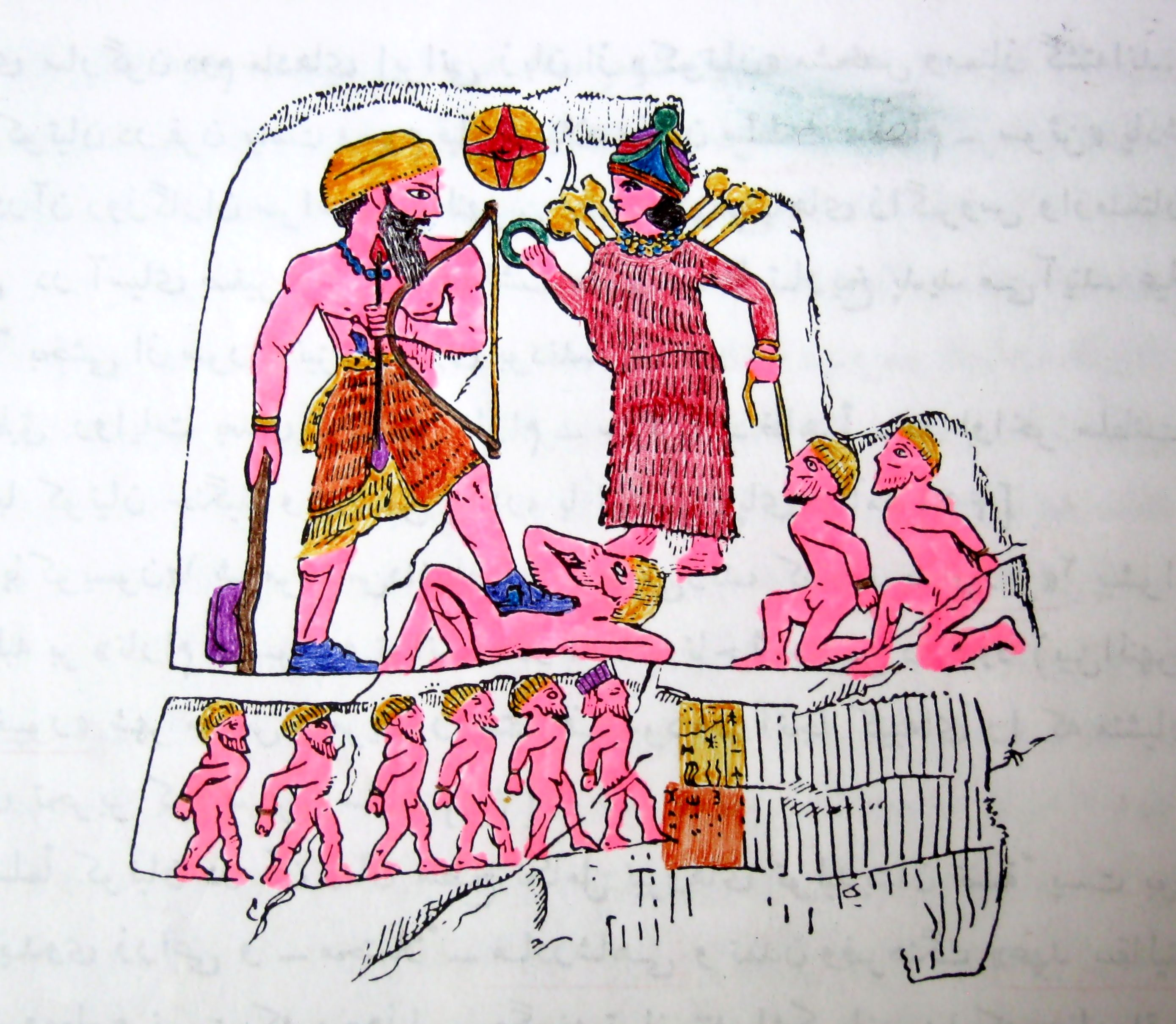
Drawing- Queen Lulubian from the relief of Sarpolzahab. The second half of the third millennium BC.
