= Sarpol-e Zahab =

City in Kermanshah province, Iran

Sarpol-e Zahab Persian: سرپل ذهاب
- City
- Serpêlî Zehaw
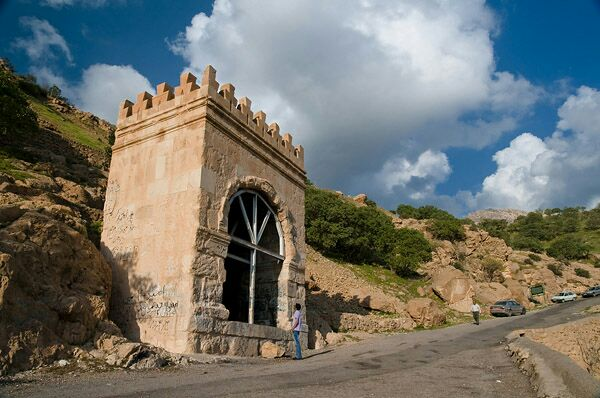

- Location within Iran
- Coordinates: 34°27′32″N 45°51′41″E
- Country: Iran
- Province: Kermanshah
- County: Sarpol-e Zahab
- District: Central

Population (2016)
  - Total: 45,481
- Time zone: UTC+3:30 (IRST)

Sarpol-e Zahab (Persian: سرپل ذهاب) (Note: Also romanized as Sar-e Pol-e Z̄ahāb, Sarpol-e Z̄ahāb, Sarpole Zahab; Sarpole-Zahâb; Sarpolezahāb; also known as Pol-e Z̄ahāb, Pol-e Z̄ohāb, Sar-ī-Pūl Zūhāb, Sarī-Pūl, Sarpol; and Serpêlî Zehaw (Kurdish: سەرپێڵی زەهاو)) is a city in the Central District of Sarpol-e Zahab County, Kermanshah province, Iran, serving as capital of both the county and the district. The town is close to Qasr-e Shirin and the Iraqi border.

== History ==
Sarpol-e Zahab was used as a missile base for ground-to-ground missiles during the Iran-Iraq War.

== Climate ==
Climate data for Sarpol Zahab (WMO ID: 40765, elevation: 545 m (1,788 ft)) (1986-2010)
Month	Jan	Feb	Mar	Apr	May	Jun	Jul	Aug	Sep	Oct	Nov	Dec	Year
Record high °C (°F)	25.6 (78.1)	27.0 (80.6)	31.0 (87.8)	36.7 (98.1)	42.4 (108.3)	45.6 (114.1)	48.0 (118.4)	49.0 (120.2)	46.8 (116.2)	42.2 (108.0)	36.0 (96.8)	30.8 (87.4)	49.0 (120.2)
Mean daily maximum °C (°F)	13.6 (56.5)	15.4 (59.7)	19.6 (67.3)	25.4 (77.7)	32.8 (91.0)	39.1 (102.4)	42.2 (108.0)	41.9 (107.4)	37.5 (99.5)	31.1 (88.0)	21.9 (71.4)	15.9 (60.6)	28.0 (82.5)
Daily mean °C (°F)	8.2 (46.8)	9.5 (49.1)	12.9 (55.2)	17.9 (64.2)	23.8 (74.8)	29.1 (84.4)	32.3 (90.1)	31.7 (89.1)	27.5 (81.5)	22.5 (72.5)	15.0 (59.0)	10.2 (50.4)	20.0 (68.1)
Mean daily minimum °C (°F)	2.8 (37.0)	3.2 (37.8)	6.0 (42.8)	10.2 (50.4)	14.4 (57.9)	18.7 (65.7)	22.2 (72.0)	21.1 (70.0)	17.2 (63.0)	13.7 (56.7)	8.0 (46.4)	4.5 (40.1)	11.8 (53.3)
Record low °C (°F)	−8.0 (17.6)	−10.0 (14.0)	−8.6 (16.5)	−2.0 (28.4)	5.0 (41.0)	9.6 (49.3)	14.4 (57.9)	16.0 (60.8)	11.0 (51.8)	4.0 (39.2)	−5.0 (23.0)	−5.0 (23.0)	−10.0 (14.0)
Average precipitation mm (inches)	77.8 (3.06)	59.8 (2.35)	80.8 (3.18)	52.0 (2.05)	14.9 (0.59)	0.3 (0.01)	0.2 (0.01)	0.1 (0.00)	0.6 (0.02)	20.7 (0.81)	51.6 (2.03)	77.3 (3.04)	436.1 (17.15)
Average rainy days	9.3	10.3	8.8	9.1	6.4	0.9	0.1	0.1	0.4	1.6	6.7	8.8	62.5
Average relative humidity (%)	66.8	66.1	61.4	59.1	48.9	30	26.2	26.9	29.8	36.5	54.2	64.6	47.5
Mean monthly sunshine hours	171.3	175.1	193.7	226.6	259.0	345.9	361.1	342.7	326.5	277.4	209.6	171.5	3,060.4
Source 1: Iran Meteorological Organization(daily minimum 1986-2005), (precipitation)
Source 2: Kermanshah Meteorological Office (rainy days, humidity, records for Apr 1988-Mar 2022, sun 1991-2021)

== Demographics ==
=== Language and ethnicity ===
The town is populated by Kurds.

Sarpol-e Zahab linguistic composition
language	percent
Southern Kurdish	65%
Central Kurdish	30%
Gorani	5%

=== Population ===
At the time of the 2006 National Census, the city's population was 34,632 in 8,210 households. The following census in 2011 counted 35,809 people in 9,447 households. The 2016 census measured the population of the city as 45,481 people in 12,850 households.

== Reliefs ==
The area of Sar-e Pol-e Zahab has several more or less well preserved reliefs of the Lullubi kingdom, as well as a Parthian relief.

=== Lullubian reliefs ===
The most famous of these reliefs is the Anubanini rock relief. Another relief named Sar-e Pol-e Zohab I is about 200 meters away, in a style similar to the Anubanini relief, but this time with a beardless ruler. The attribution to a specific ruler remains uncertain. There are also other Lullubian relief in the same area of Sar-e Pol-e Zahab.

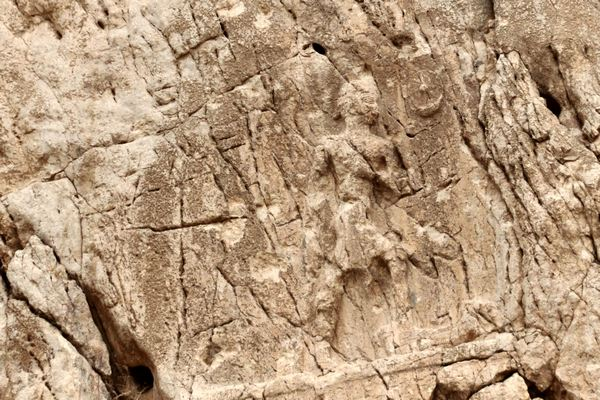
Sar-e Pol-e Zahab, relief I

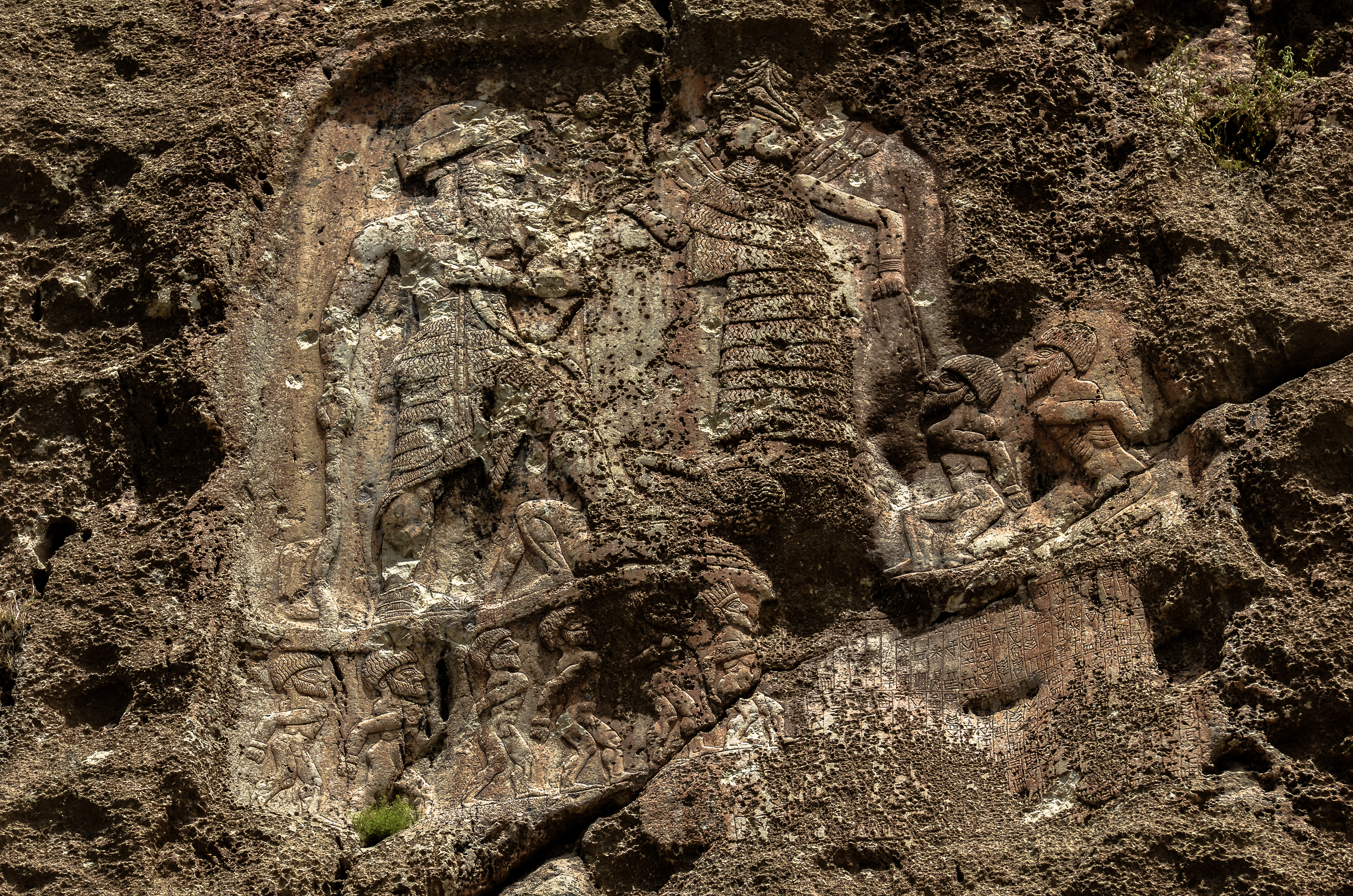
Sar-e Pol-e Zahab, relief II: Anubanini rock relief

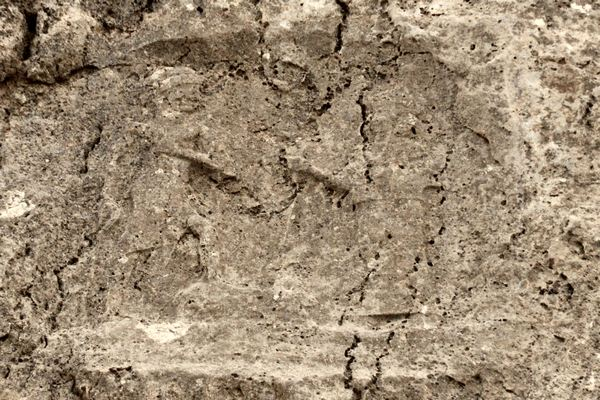
Sar-e Pol-e Zahab, relief III

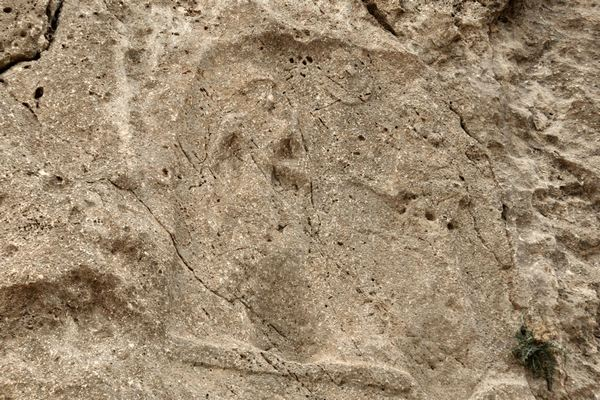
Sar-e Pol-e Zahab, relief IV

=== Parthian relief ===
Another relief is located below the Anubanini relief, lower on the cliff. This relief was created during the Parthian Empire in the name of Gotarzes, possibly Gotarzes I, but more probably the Parthian king Gotarzes II, who ruled from 39 to 51 CE and is known to have made other reliefs, such as the equestrian relief at Behistun.

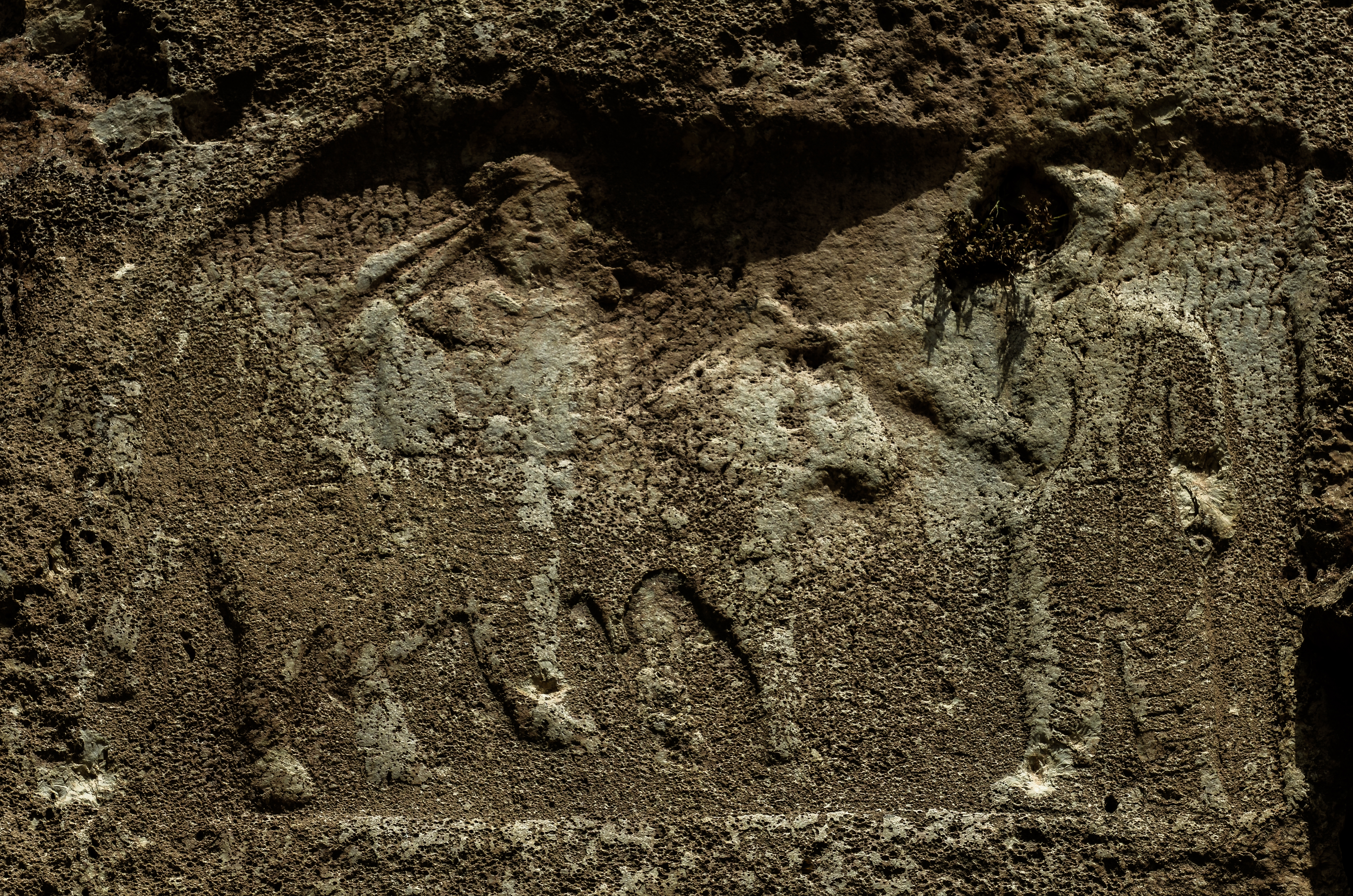
The second relief, below the Anubanini relief, a Parthian relief.

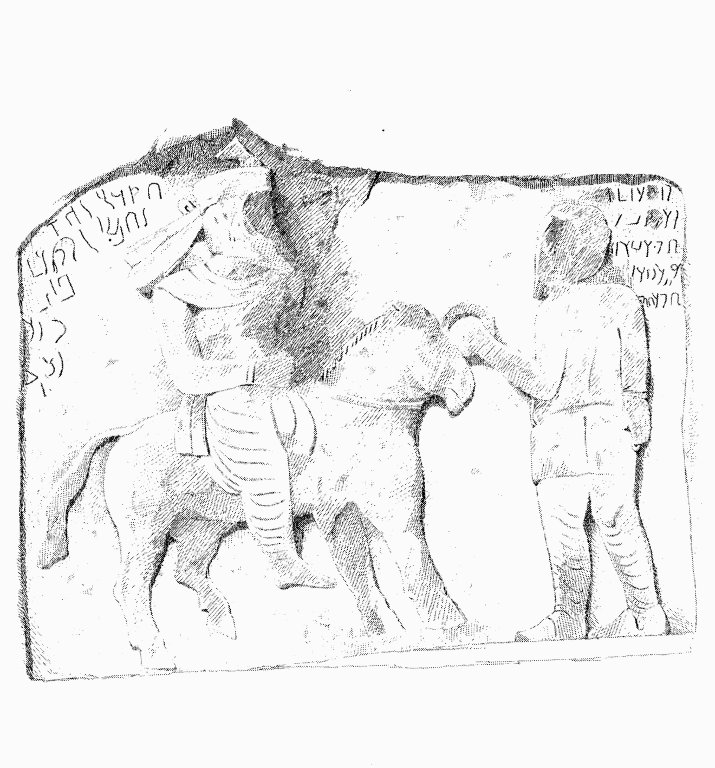
Drawing of the Parthian relief.

== See also ==
- Taq-e Gara
- Gilan-e Gharb
