= Art of rock relief in ancient Iran =

Ancient artistic practice

The art of rock relief has been practiced by several civilizations during Iranian Antiquity since the end of the 3rd millennium BC. Iran, with 90 panels known in 2007 and distributed mainly in the provinces of Fars, Kurdistan, and Khuzestan, has the largest Middle Eastern concentration of ancient rock reliefs. This profusion is explained by the abundance of rock material in western Iran. It is also due to the fact that, drawing inspiration from its predecessors both for the choice of themes and for that of the sites, each new empire marks its advent by the realization of new panels and thus makes the art evolve. Although uniquely Iranian, this representative art form is constantly influenced from the outside.

It is particularly expressed at sacred sites, located near water or ancient trade routes. As early as the 7th century, Western travelers made mention of this original art. Their description was refined from the fourteenth century, and they were the subject of scientific research from the nineteenth century. The first reliefs are scenes of divine inauguration and victory carved by the Lullubis. The Elamite civilization subsequently produced great religious and sacred scenes in Izeh, then the Assyrians commemorated their military victories over Elam. Driven by Darius the Great the Achaemenids made rock relief an official royal art with a mainly funerary vocation.

== Main Features ==
=== A typical art of the Iranian plateau ===
Several powerful empires emerged on the Iranian plateau in ancient times. Certain monarchs seeking to express their power and to assert their power on lasting supports. Using the hard rock material particularly common in Iran for this, they have frescoes carved out of stone. The same places are often used by several successive empires, thus creating in effect a continuity in space in addition to the continuity observed in time. Almost all of which are in the western provinces of the country: Fars, Khuzestan, and Kermanshah. Since then, three other reliefs have been discovered, to which is added a single relief outside present-day Iran, in Afghanistan. They thus constitute the largest Middle Eastern concentration of ancient rock reliefs. These elements give this practice the characteristics of a typically Iranian art.

=== A thousand-year-old art ===
The first reliefs, attributed to the , were made at the start of the 2nd millennium BC. Elamite rock art inspires those developed by subsequent empires, to the point that Elamite, Achaemenid, Seleucid, Parthian rock panels, then Sassanids were carved on the same places. The sacred character of these sites thus remains perennial, as in Naqsh-e Rostam, Behistun, or Izeh. The principle of representation of audiences seated on a throne, dress, or the use of several registers will inspire the Achaemenid reliefs.

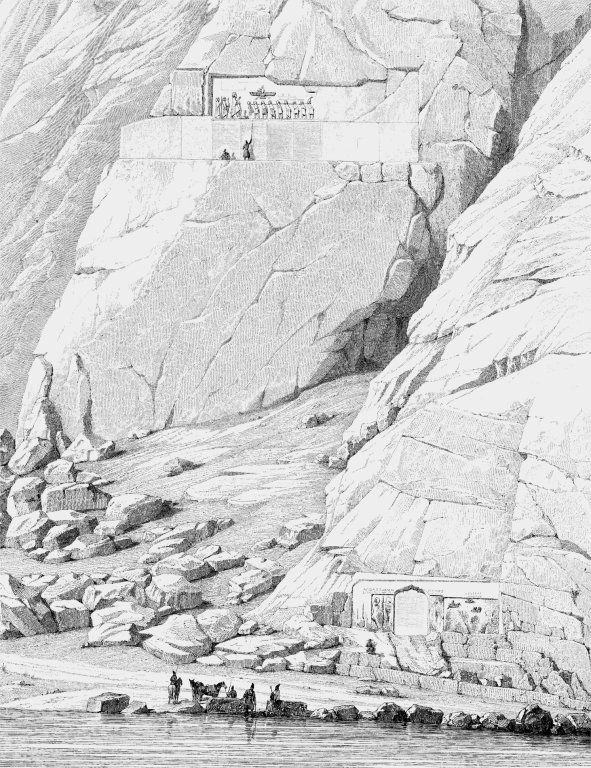
7 century Achaemenid and Parthian reliefs from Behistun

After freeing themselves from Parthian rule, and in order to legitimize their dynasty, the Sassanids seek to represent themselves as a continuity with the Achaemenid dynasty, founder of the first Persian Empire. Ardashir I is thus presented by Iranian tradition as a descendant of the Achaemenids, and the legend he inspires echoes that of Cyrus the Great.In addition, the Sassanids frequently encountered Roman and Christian expansion during the four centuries of their rule. Along with the classification, organization, and then establishment of Zoroastrianism as a state religion, the affirmation of identity is used as a unifying link.

Almost all of the first Sassanid kings have frescoes implemented, with the main exception of Ardashir II. (The reigns of Hormizd I and Bahram III were too short to have panels made). The first centuries thus saw most of the Sassanid reliefs being made.

After this prosperous period, art seemed to fall into disuse for a period of two centuries, during which no more panels were produced. It was not until Khosrow II the last important Sassanid ruler, that frescoes were painted for the last time in Taq-e Bostan. The thousand-year-old tradition of rock relief did not survive the end of the Sassanid Empire. The Muslim conquest of Persia In the 7th century AD and the advent of the Persian Middle Ages put an end to this ancient art.
