= Qiz Qapan =

Qiz Qapan قيزقاپان
- Village
- Location within Iran
- Coordinates: 38°18′26″N 46°49′41″E
- Country: Iran
- Province: East Azerbaijan
- County: Heris
- Bakhsh: Khvajeh
- Rural District: Bedevostan-e Gharbi

Population (2006)
  - Total: 92
- Time zone: UTC+3:30 (IRST)
  - Summer (DST): UTC+4:30 (IRDT)

Qiz Qapan (Persian: قيزقاپان, also Romanized as Qīz Qāpān; also known as Kizganāb, Kyzgalar, Qezqāpān, and Qez Qāpān) is a village in Bedevostan-e Gharbi Rural District, Khvajeh District, Heris County, East Azerbaijan Province, Iran. At the 2006 census, its population was 92, in 25 families.
