= Zamua =

Ancient Pre-Iranian kingdom

Zamua (also Mazamua) was an ancient Iron Age Pre-Iranian kingdom, corresponding with the earlier kingdom of Lullubi, which stretched from Lake Urmia to the upper reaches of the Diyala River, roughly corresponding with the modern Sulaimania governorate (still called Zamua/Zamwa ) in Iraqi Kurdistan. It was centered at Sharazur plain. Ameka and Arashtua were two southern Zamuan kingdoms. A tribal chief (Nasiku) bearing the Akkadian name of Nūr-Adad was a Zamuan leader who launched a failed resistance against Assyrian domination. Its inhabitants were most probably related to the Gutians living east and south of Zamua, and the Hurrians living northwest of the Kingdom.

== Inner Zamua ==
The northern regions of Zamua (towards lake Urmia) were known as Inner Zamua. Ida was the most important state in Inner Zamua, with Nikdera one of its most important rulers.

== Akkadian Period (Simurrum) ==
Stela of Iddi-Sin, King of Simurrum. It dates back to the Old Babylonian Period. From Qarachatan Village, Slemani Governorate, Iraqi Kurdistan. Located in the Slemani Museum, Iraq.

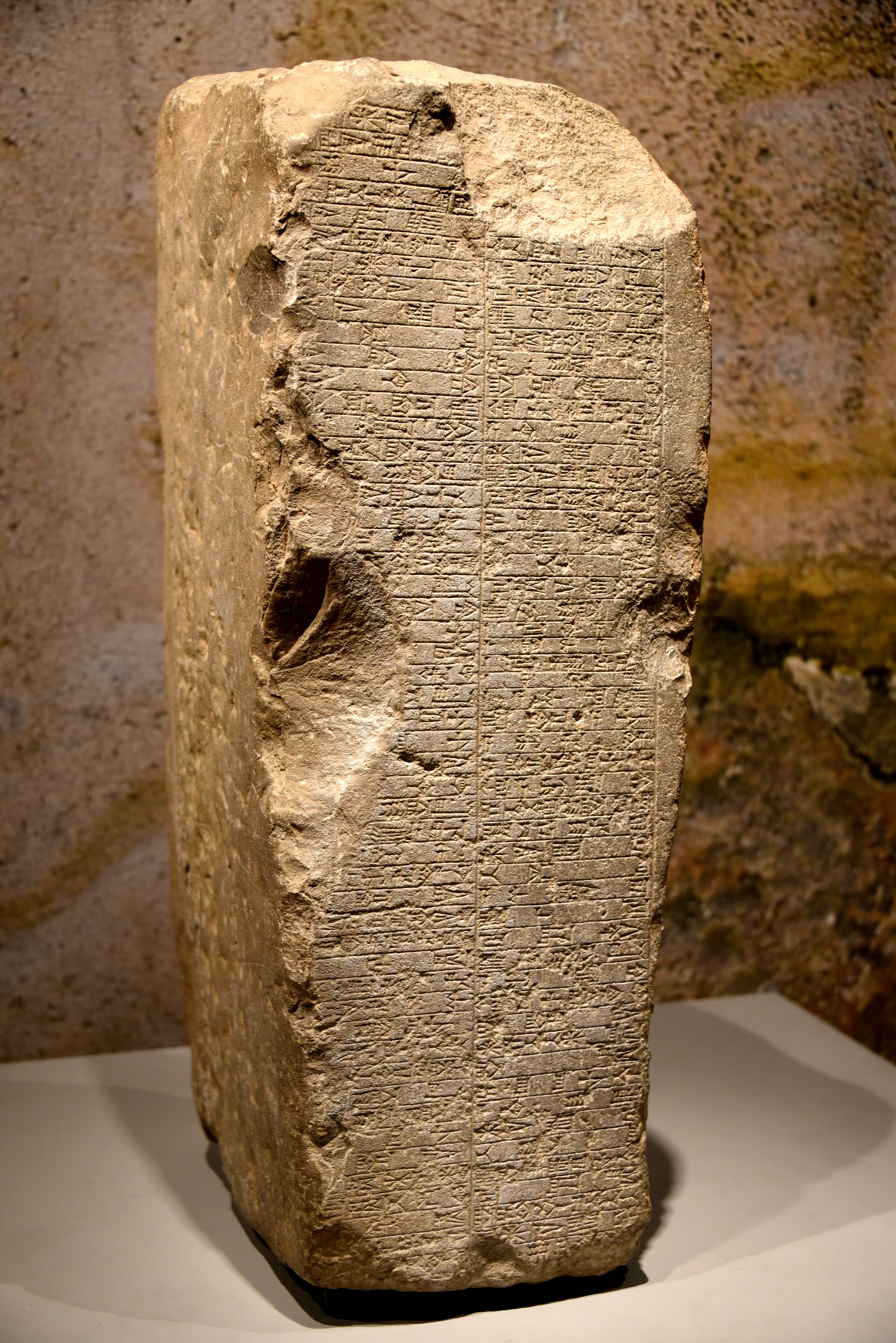

== Neo-Assyrian Period (Mazamua) ==
In the Neo-Assyrian Period, Mazamua was an Assyrian province with the provincial capital of the same name Mazamua (modern Suleimaniya). Lake Zeribar was considered by the Assyrians as Inner Mazamua. The region of Slemani was known as Zamwa prior to the foundation of the modern city in 1784. It is surrounded by the Azmar (Ezmer), Goizha (Goyje) and Qaiwan (Qeywan) Mountains in the northeast, Baranan Mountain in the south and the Tasluja Hills in the west. The city has a semi-arid climate with very hot dry summers and cold wet winters.

A letter is known where Sargon II speaks to Šarru-emuranni, his governor of Mazamua.
