= Lullubi =

2300–675 BC Ancient Near Eastern group of tribes

Lullubi Kingdom 𒇻𒇻𒉈𒆠
- 3100 BC–675 BC
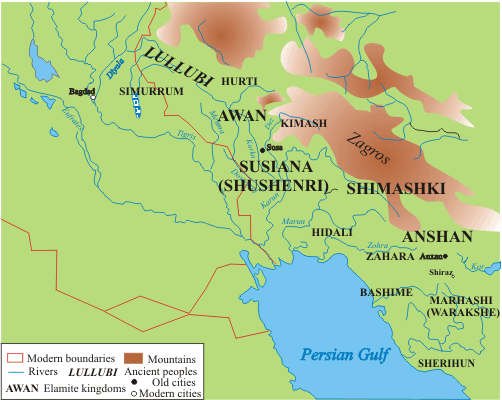
- Territory of the Lullubi in the Mesopotamia area.
- Common languages: Unclassified (Lullubian?); Akkadian (inscriptions)
- Religion: Mesopotamian religions
- Government: Monarchy
- Historical era: Antiquity
  - Established: 3100 BC
  - Disestablished: 675 BC
Succeeded by
Zamua
- Today part of: Iraq; Iran

Lullubi, Lulubi (Akkadian: 𒇻𒇻𒉈𒆠, romanized: Lu-lu-bi^{ki}, lit. 'Country of the Lullubi'), more commonly known as Lullu, were a group of Bronze Age tribes who existed and disappeared during the 3rd millennium BC. They were from a region known as Lulubum, now the Sharazor plain of the Zagros Mountains of modern-day Sulaymaniyah Governorate in Kurdistan Region, Iraq. Lullubi was a neighbour and sometimes ally with the Hurrian Simurrum kingdom and came into conflict with the Semitic Akkadian Empire and Assyria. Frayne (1990) identified their city Lulubuna or Luluban with the region's modern town of Halabja.

== Historical references ==
=== Legends ===
The early Sumerian legend Lugalbanda and the Anzud Bird, set in the reign of Enmerkar of Uruk, alludes to the "mountains of Lulubi" as being where the character of Lugalbanda encounters the gigantic Anzû bird while searching for the rest of Enmerkar's army en route to siege Aratta.

=== Akkadian Empire and Gutian dynasty ===
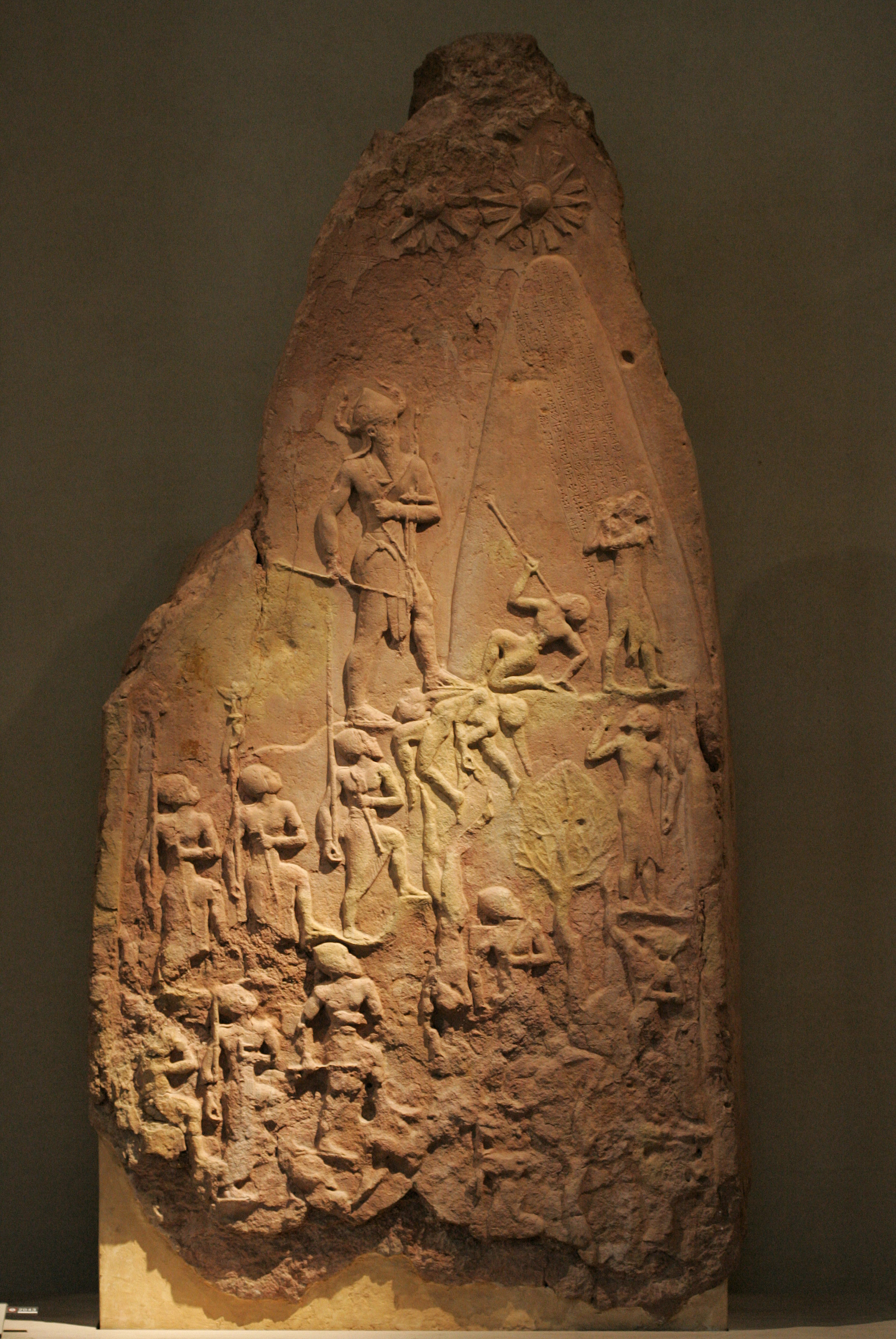
The Victory Stele of Naram-Sin (circa 2250 BC), commemorating the victory of Akkadian Empire king Naram-Sin (standing left) over Lullubi mountain tribe and their king Satuni. Musée du Louvre.

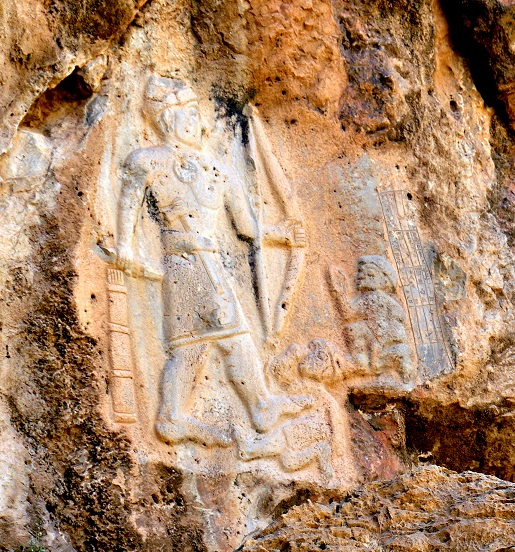
Relief of the Lulubian Tardunni, known as the Darband-i Belula, the Darband-i Hurin or Sheikhan relief, Kurdistan, Iraq

Lullubum appears in historical times as one of the lands Sargon the Great subjugated within his Akkadian Empire, along with the neighboring province of Gutium, which was possibly of the same Hurrian origin as the Lullubi. Sargon's grandson Naram Sin defeated the Lullubi and their king Satuni, and had his famous victory stele made in commemoration:

"Naram-Sin the powerful ... . Sidur and Sutuni, princes of the Lulubi, gathered together and they made war against me."

— Akkadian inscription on the Victory Stele of Naram-Sin.

After the Akkadian Empire fell to the Gutians, the Lullubians rebelled against the Gutian king Erridupizir, according to Mesopotamian inscriptions:

Ka-Nisba, king of Simurrum, instigated the people of Simurrum and Lullubi to revolt. Amnili, general of [the enemy Lullubi] ... made the land [rebel] ... Erridu-pizir, the mighty, king of Gutium and of the four quarters hastened [to confront] him ... In a single day he captured the pass of Urbillum at Mount Mummum. Further, he captured Nirishuha.

— Inscription R2:226-7 of Erridupizir.

=== Neo-Sumerian Empire ===
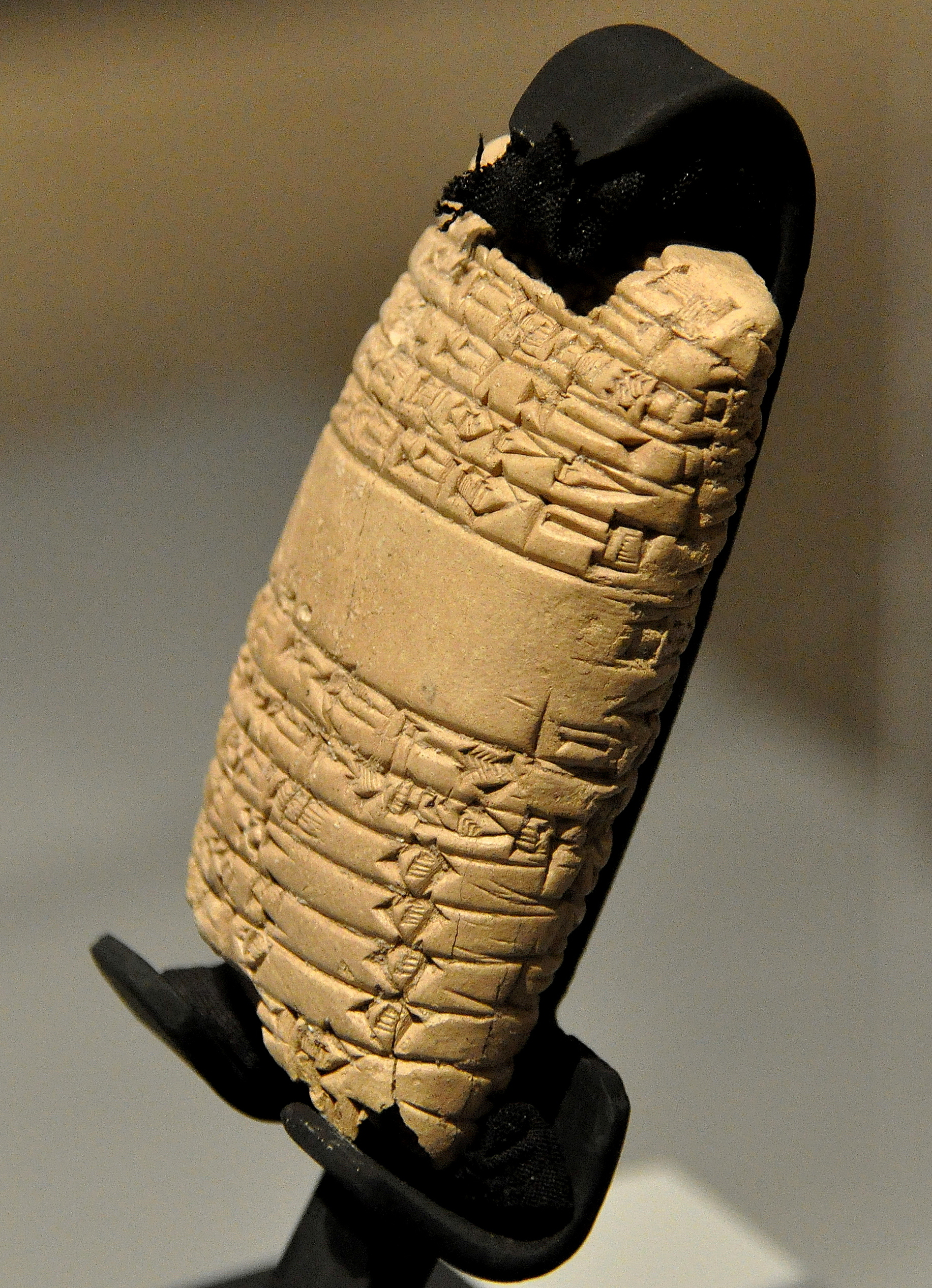
Tablet of Shulgi, glorifies the King and his victories on the Lullubi people, Sulaymaniyah Museum, Iraq

Following the short lived Gutian period, the Neo-Sumerian Empire (Ur-III) ruler Shulgi is said to have raided Lullubi at least 9 times; by the time of Amar-Sin, Lullubians formed a contingent in the military of Ur, suggesting that the region was then under Neo-Sumerian control.

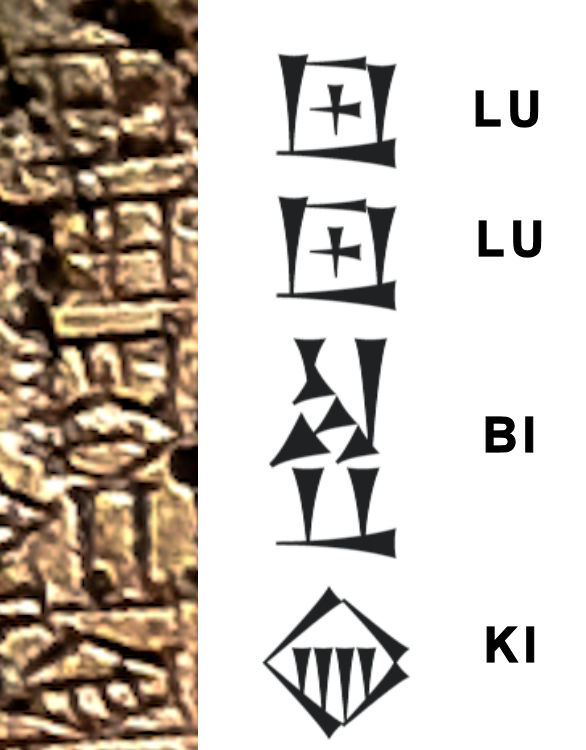
Lullubi-ki ("Country of the Lullubi") on the Anubanini rock relief

Another famous rock relief depicting the Lullubian king Anubanini with the Assyrian-Babylonian goddess Ishtar, captives in tow, is now thought to date to the Ur-III period; however, a later Assyrian- Babylonian legendary retelling of the exploits of Sargon the Great mentions Anubanini as one of his opponents.

=== Babylonian and Assyrian interactions ===
In the following (second) millennium BC, the term "Lullubi" or "Lullu" seems to have become a generic Babylonian/Assyrian term for "highlander" without reference to any single ethnic group, while the original region of Lullubi became the Hurrian inhabited Zamua. However, the "land of Lullubi" makes a reappearance in the late 12th century BC, when both Nebuchadnezzar I of Babylon (in c. 1120 BC) and Tiglath-Pileser I of Assyria (in 1113 BC) subdued it. Neo-Assyrian kings of the following centuries also recorded campaigns and conquests in the area of Lullubum. Most notably, Ashurnasirpal II had to suppress a revolt among the Zamuan chiefs in 881 BC, during which they constructed a wall in the Bazian pass between modern Kirkuk (the Assyrian city of Arrapḫa) and Sulaymaniyah in a failed attempt to keep the Assyrians out.

They were said to have had 19 walled cities in their land, as well as a large supply of horses, cattle, metals, textiles and wine, which were carried off by Ashurnasirpal. Local chiefs or governors of the Zamua region continued to be mentioned down to the end of Esarhaddon's reign (669 BC) after which they disappear from history.

== Representations ==
Defeated Lullubis in Akkadian representations

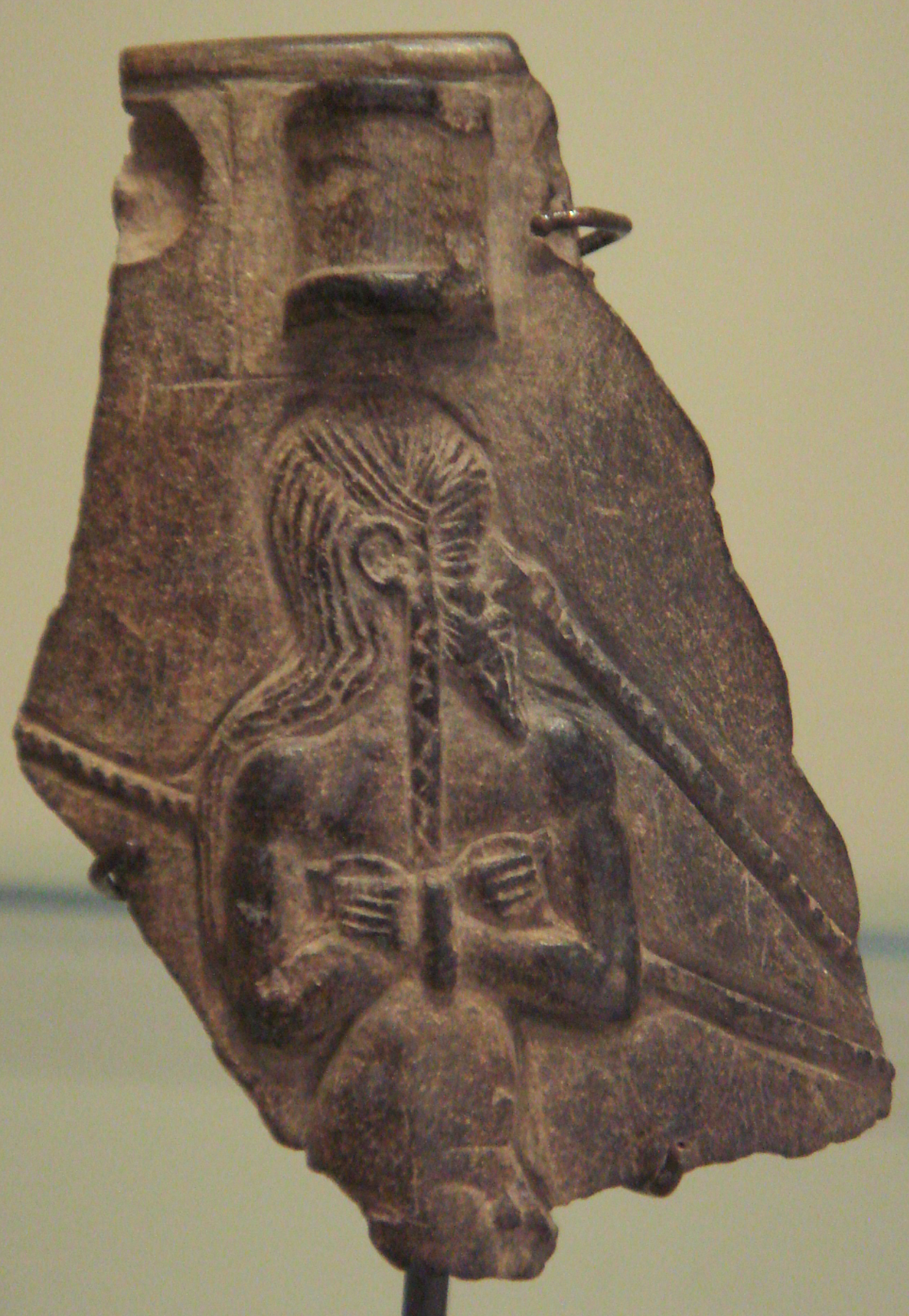
Barbarian prisoner of the Akkadian Empire, nude, fettered, drawn by nose ring, with pointed beard, long hair and vertical braid. 2350-2000 BC, Louvre Museum.

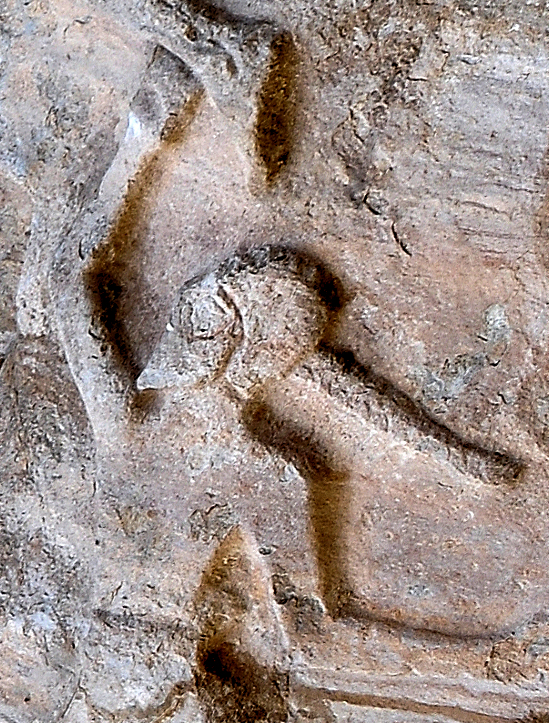
Lullubi victim with pointed beard and long braided hair. Rock relief at Darband-iGawr. The depiction of the vanquished Lullubis is also similar in the Victory Stele of Naram-Sin.

In depictions of them, the Lullubi were represented as warlike mountain people. The Lullubi are often shown bare-chested and wearing animal skins. They had short beards and their hair was long and worn in a thick braid, as can be seen on the Victory Stele of Naram-Sin.

== Rulers ==
The following is a list of known rulers of the Lullubi kingdom.

1. Immashkush (c. 2400 BC)
2. Anubanini (c. 2350 BC) he ordered to make an inscription on the rock near Sar-e Pol-e Zahab.
3. Satuni (c. 2270 BC contemporary with Naram-Sin king of Akkad and Khita king of Awan)
4. Irib (c. 2037 BC)
5. Darianam (c. 2000 BC)
6. Ikki (precise dates unknown)
7. Tar ... duni (precise dates unknown) son of Ikki. His inscription is found not far from the inscription of Anubanini.
8. Nur-Adad (c. 881 – 880 BC)
9. Zabini (c. 881 BC)
10. Hubaia (c. 830 BC) vassal of Assyrians
11. Dada (c. 715 BC)
12. Larkutla (c. 675 BC)

== Lullubi rock reliefs ==
Various Lullubian reliefs can be seen in the area of Sar-e Pol-e Zohab, the best preserved of which is the Anubanini rock relief. They all show a ruler trampling an enemy, and most also show a deity facing the ruler. Another relief can be found about 200 meters away, in a style similar to the Anubanini relief, but this time with a beardless ruler. The attribution to a specific ruler remains uncertain.

=== Anubanini rock relief ===
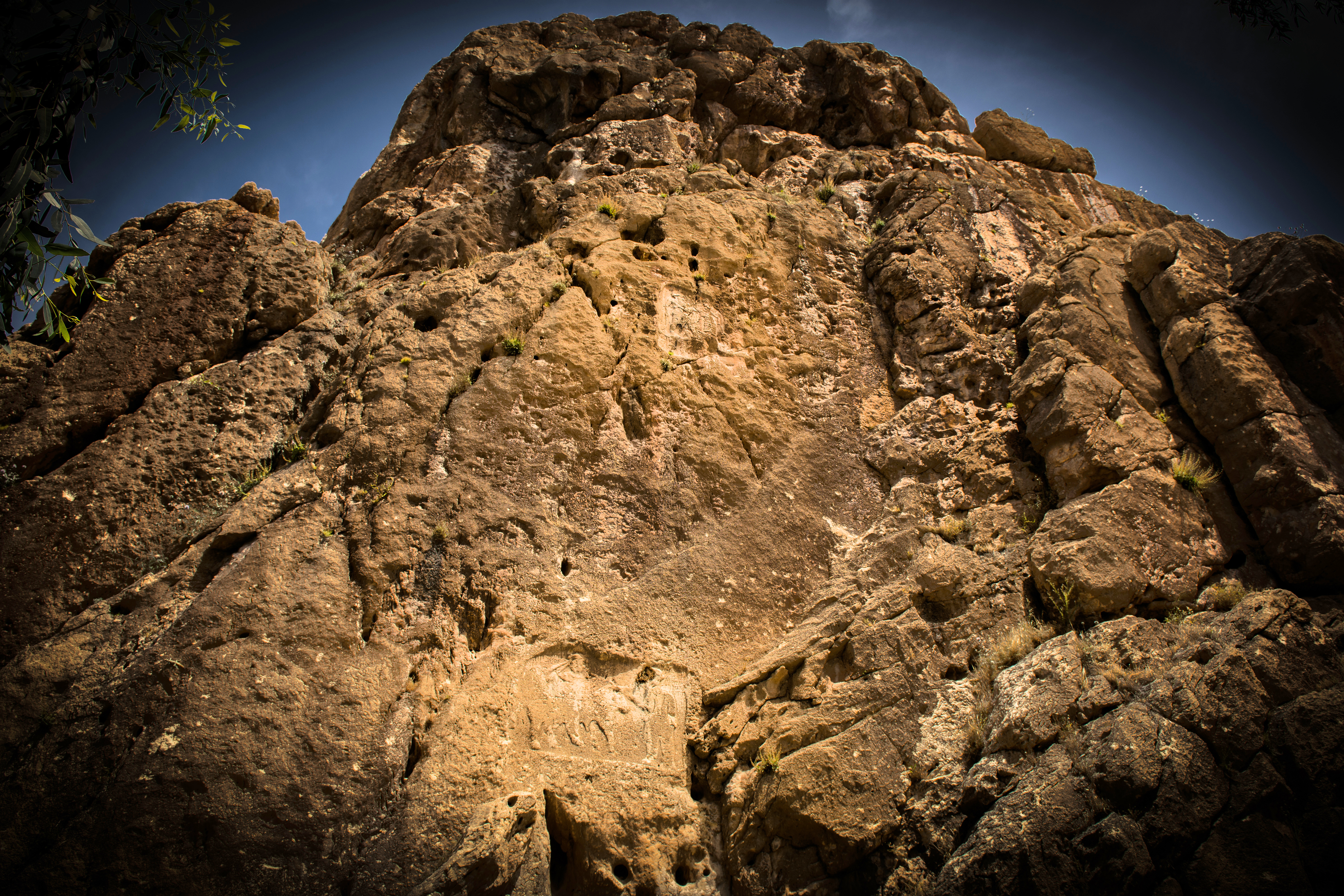
The relief is located on the top of a cliff towering over the village of Sarpol-e Zahab. A second relief from the Parthian Empire period appears below.

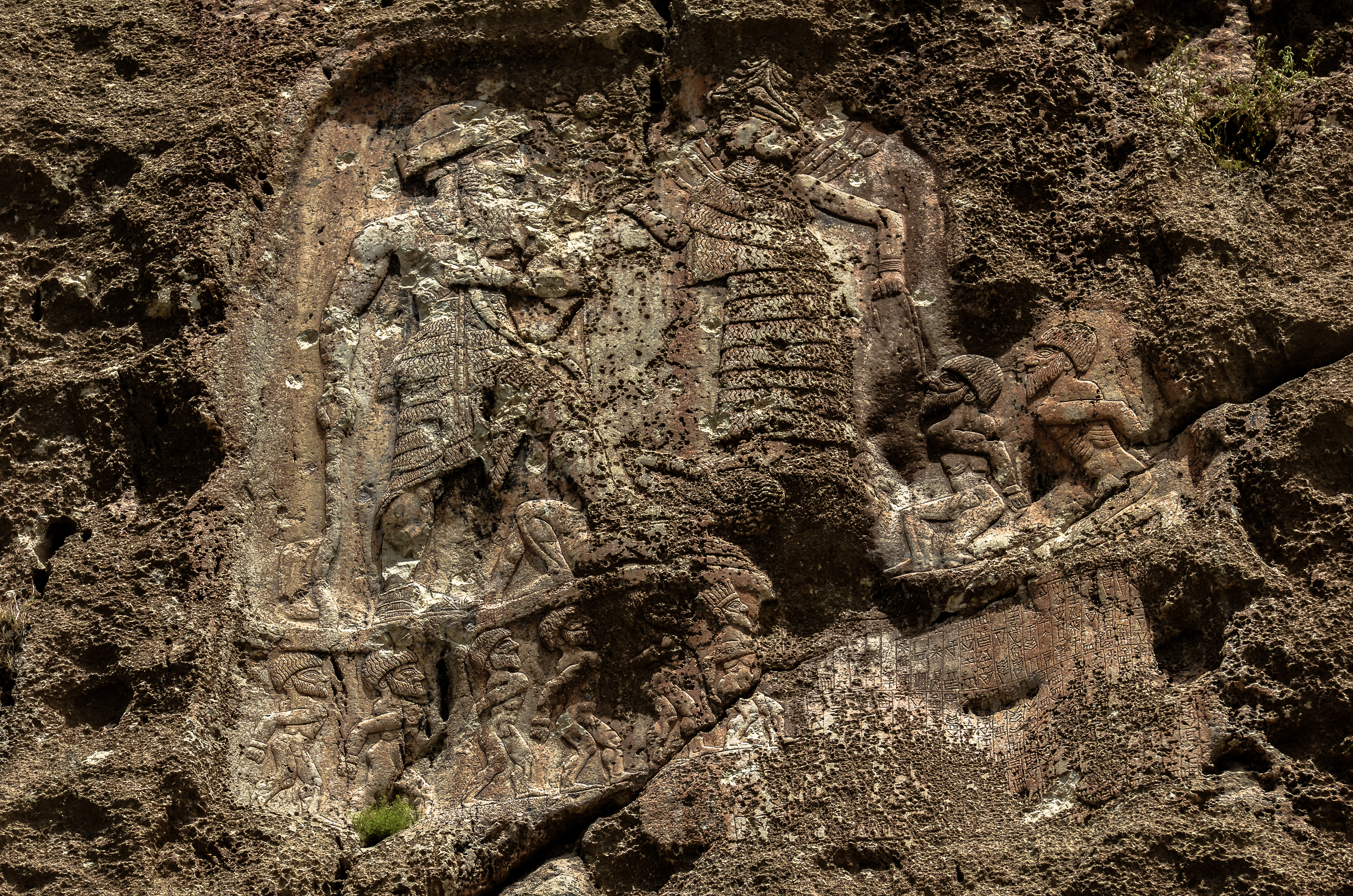
Anubanini rock relief at Sarpol-e Zahab, also called Sarpol-e Zahab II.

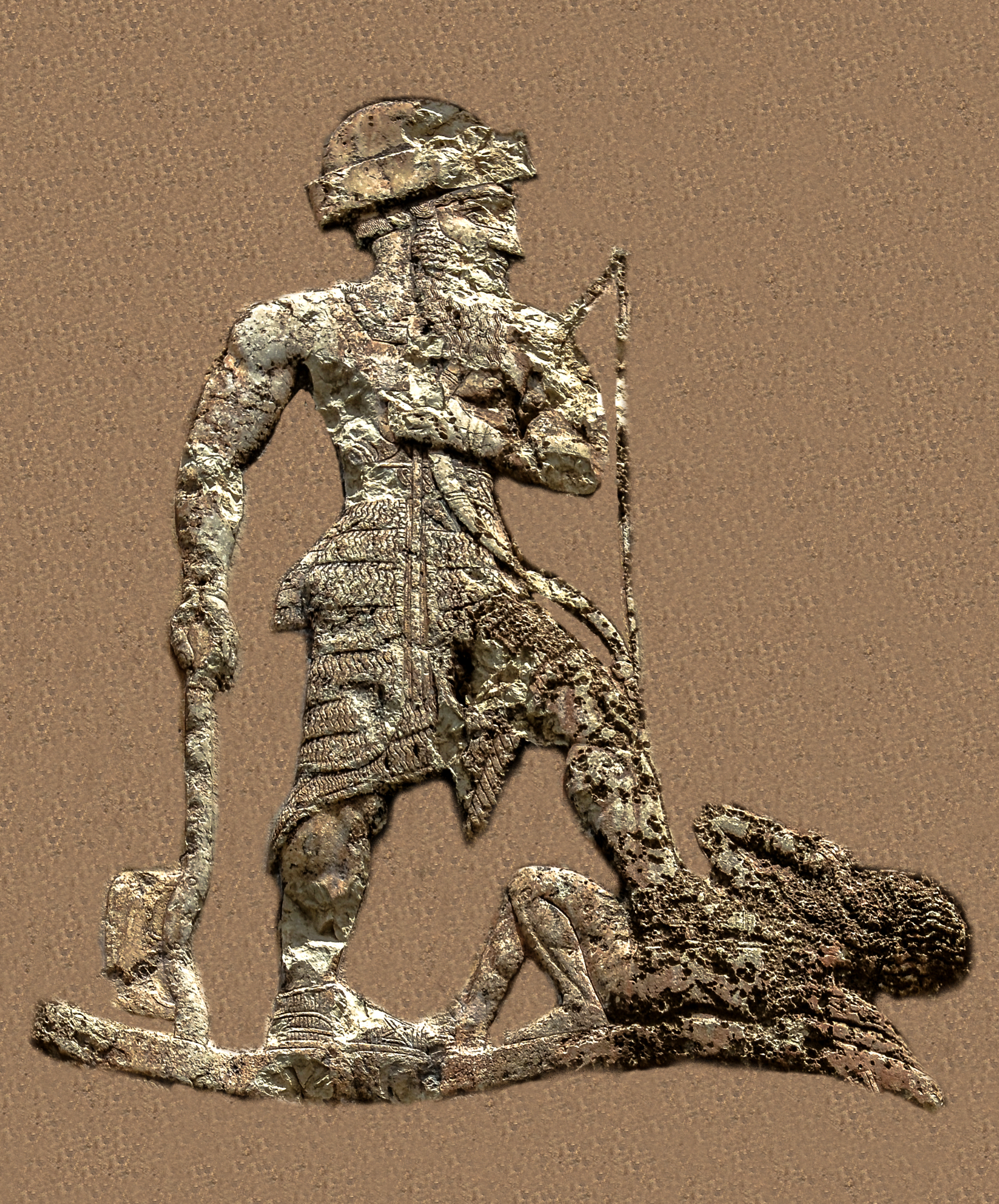
King Anubanini.

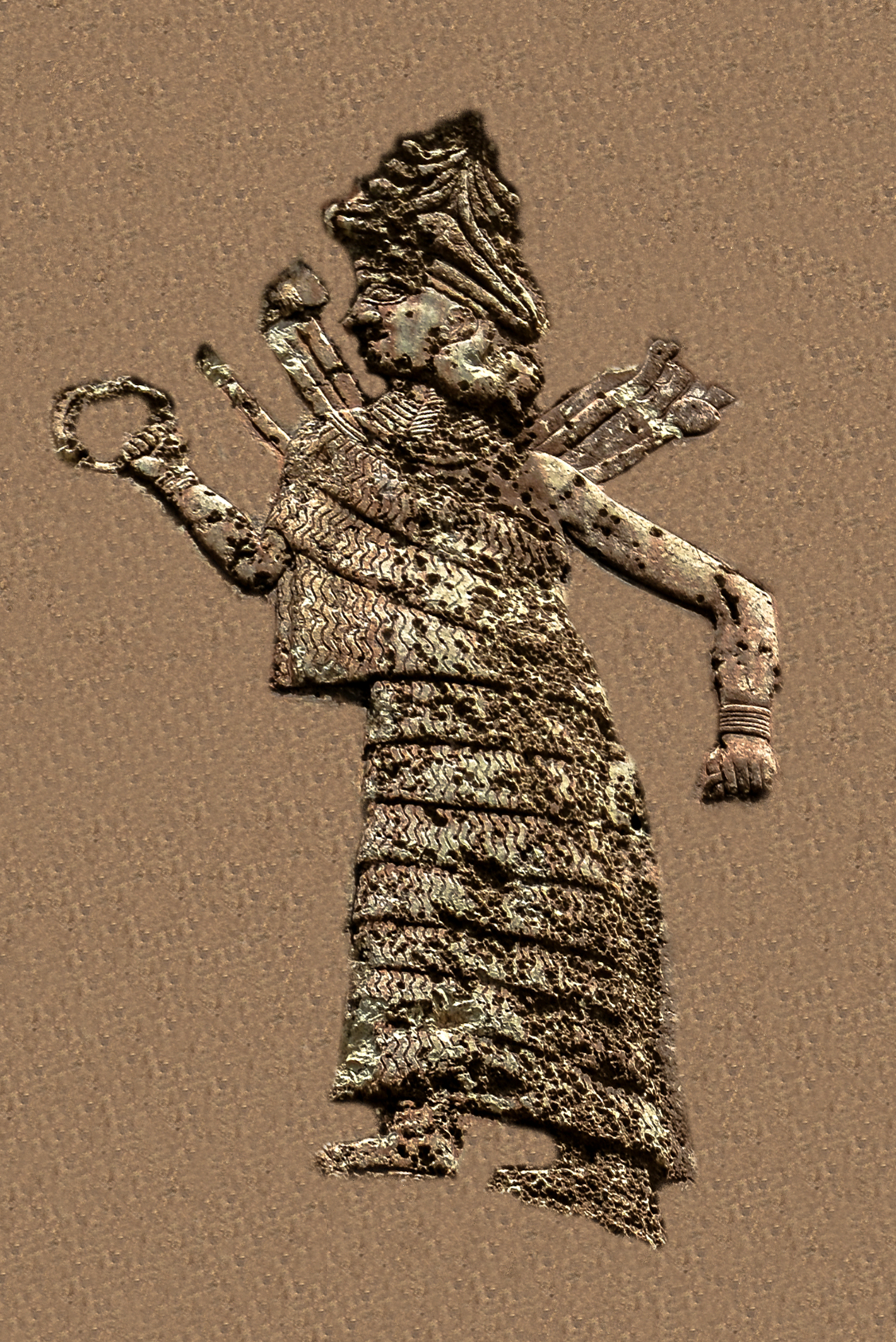
Goddess Ishtar.

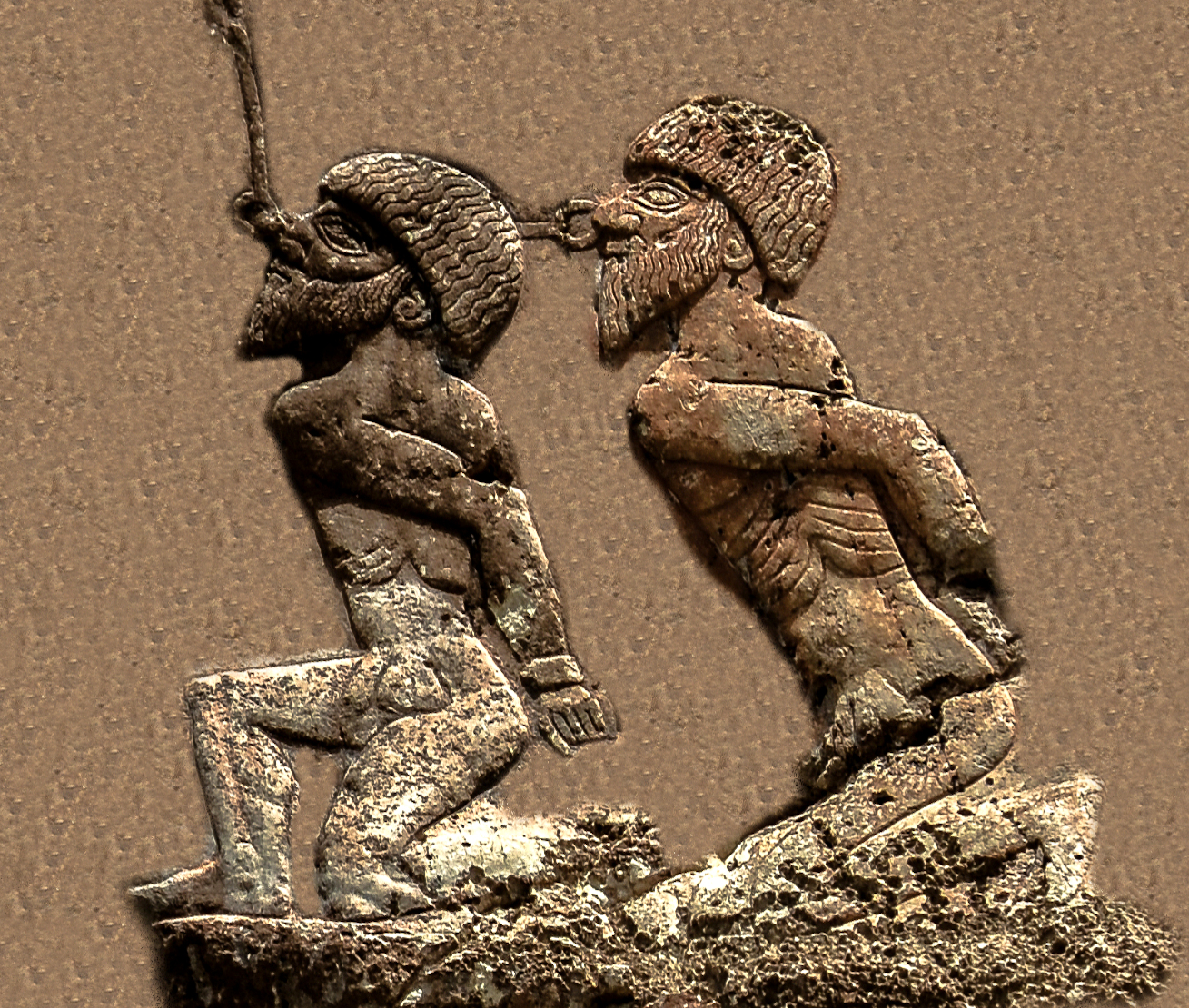
Prisoners of the Lullubis (detail).

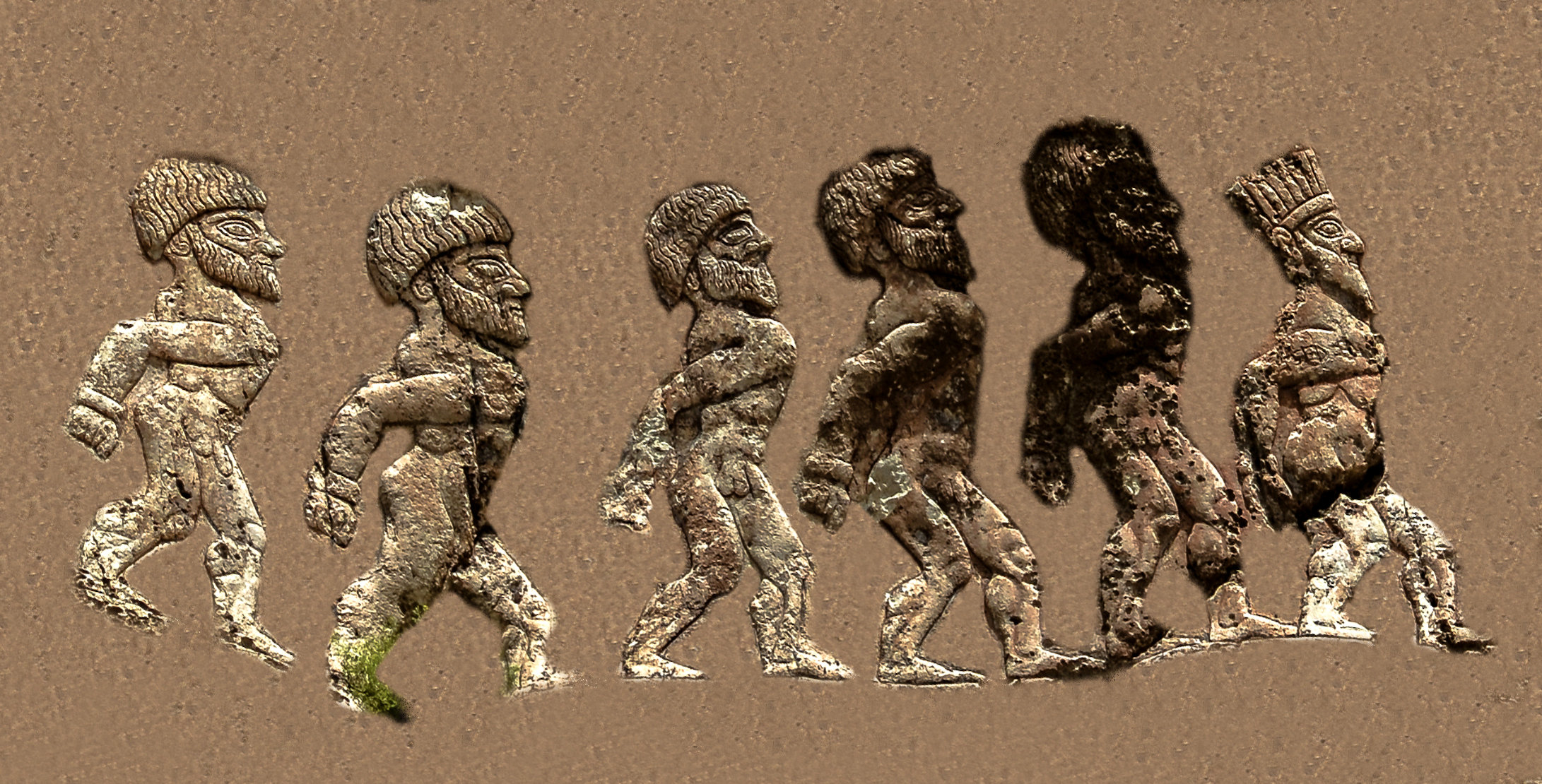
Prisoners of the Lullubis and their king (detail).

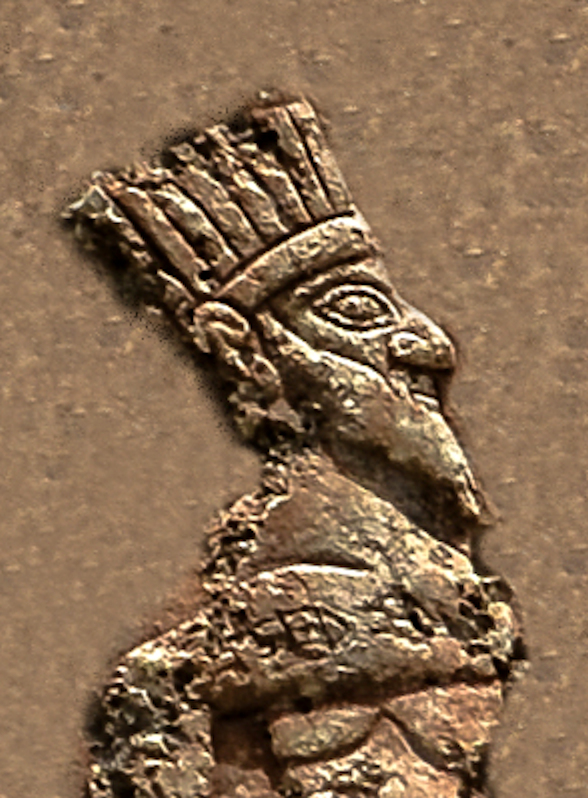
Prisoner king (detail). He appears to be wearing a crown.

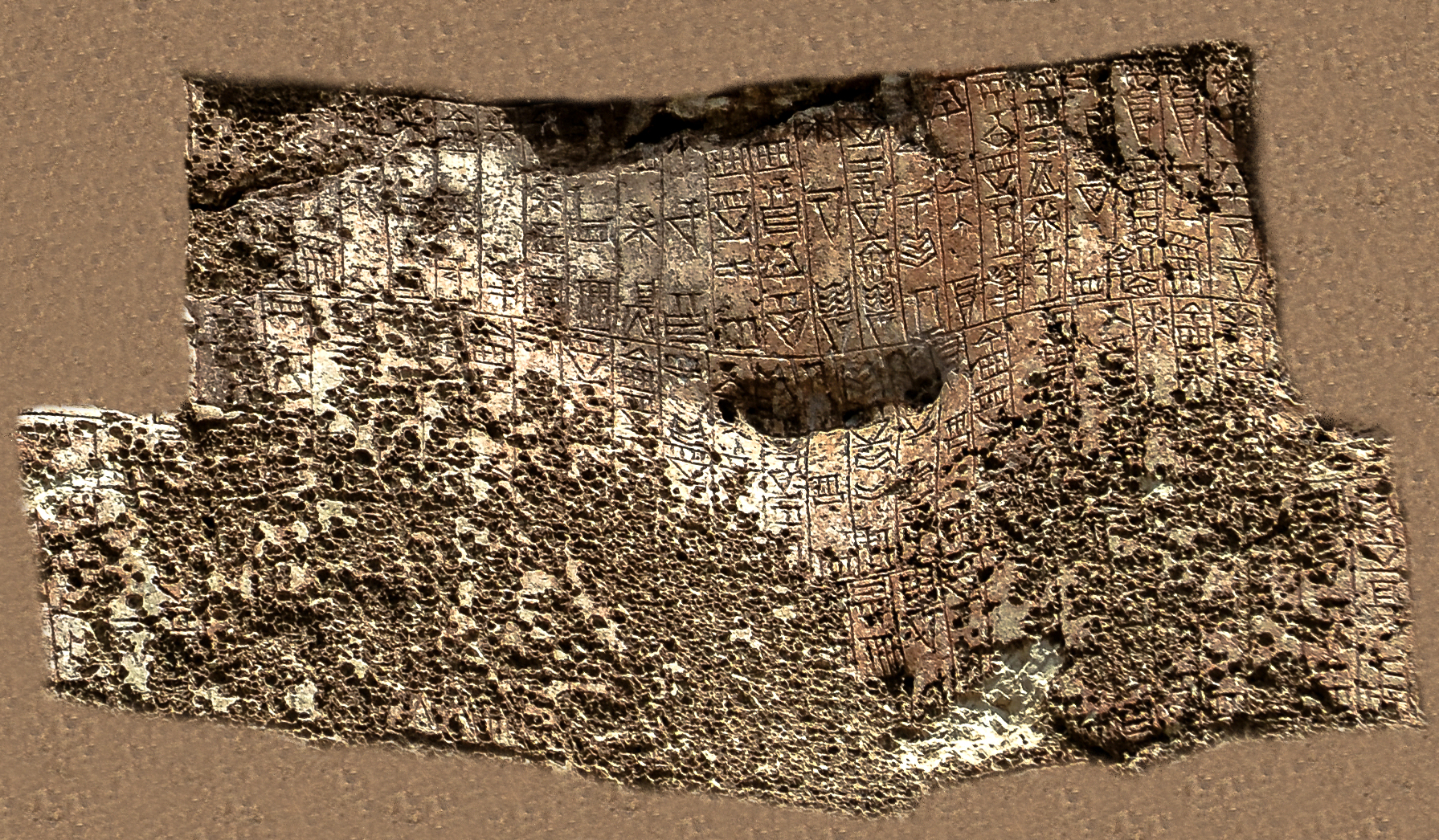
An Akkadian inscription on the relief.

=== Other Lullubi reliefs ===
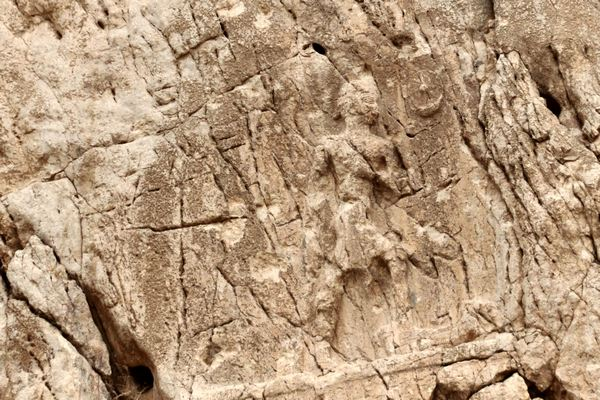
Sar-e Pol-e Zahab, relief I. Beardless warrior with axe, trampling a foe. Sundisk above. A name "Zaba(zuna), son of ..." can be read. This is possibly the son of Iddin-Sin, a ruler of the Kingdom of Simurrum.

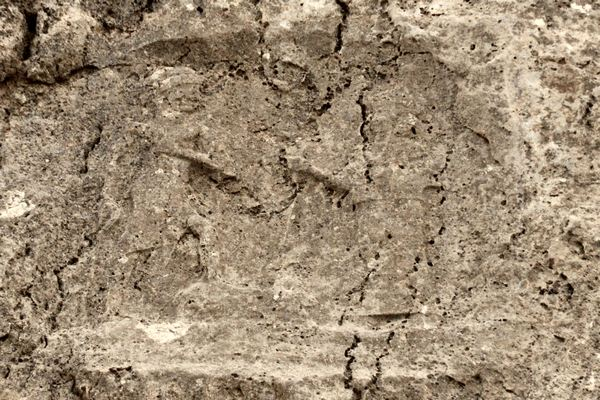
Sar-e Pol-e Zahab, relief III. Beardless warrior trampling a foe, facing a goddess.

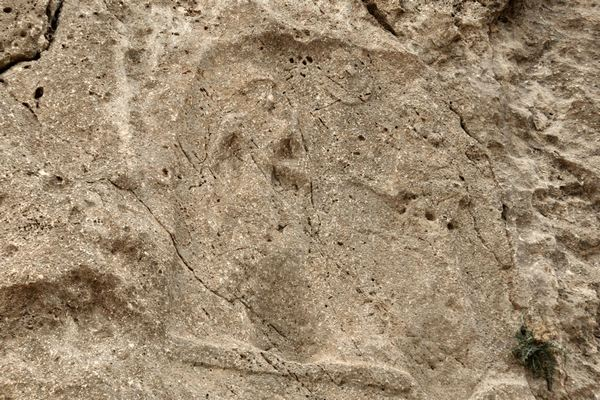
Sar-e Pol-e Zahab, relief IV. Beardless warrior trampling a foe, facing a goddess.

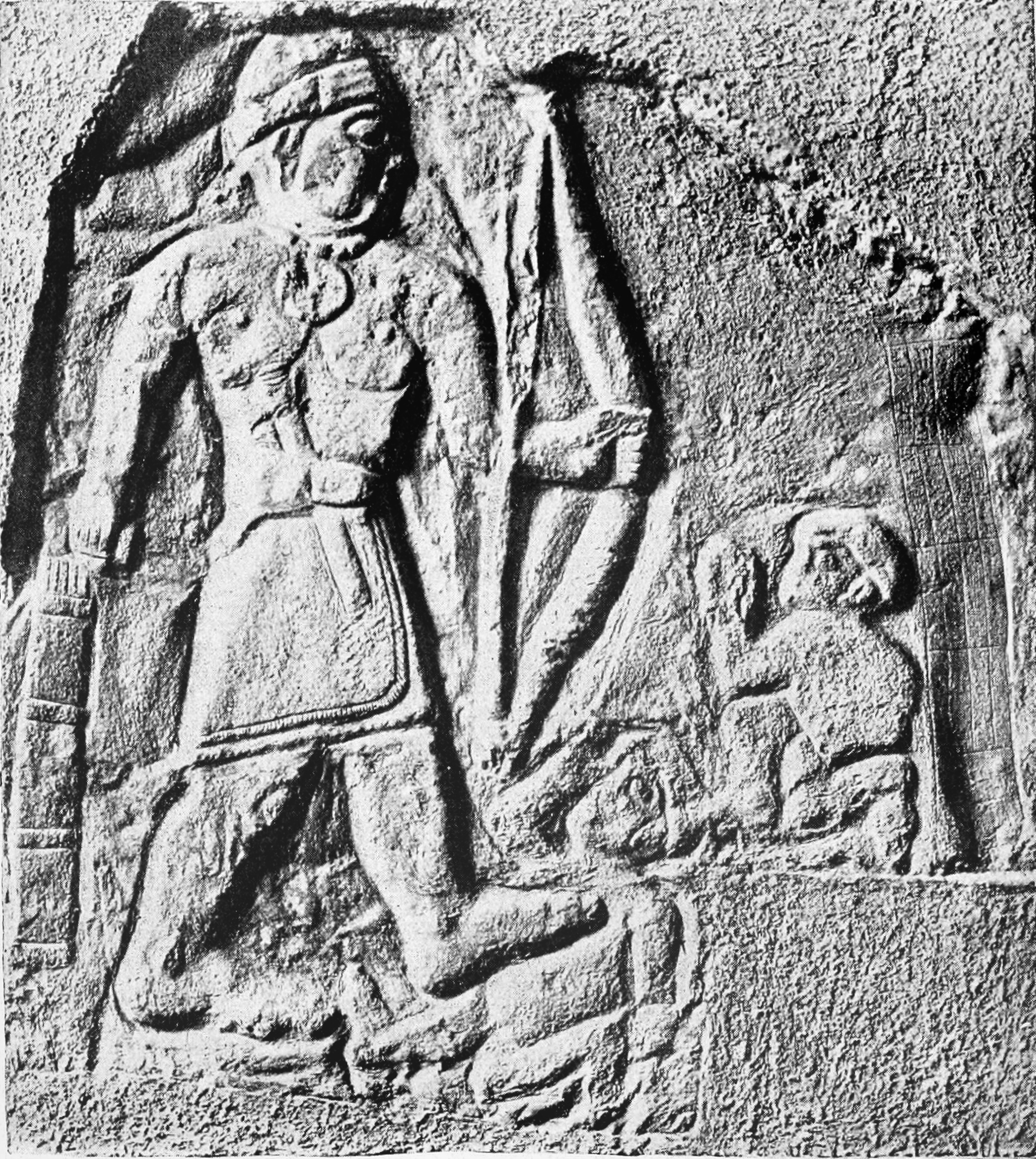
Relief of Tardunni, a possible Lullubi ruler, also holding weapons and trampling foes, with an inscription in Akkadian.

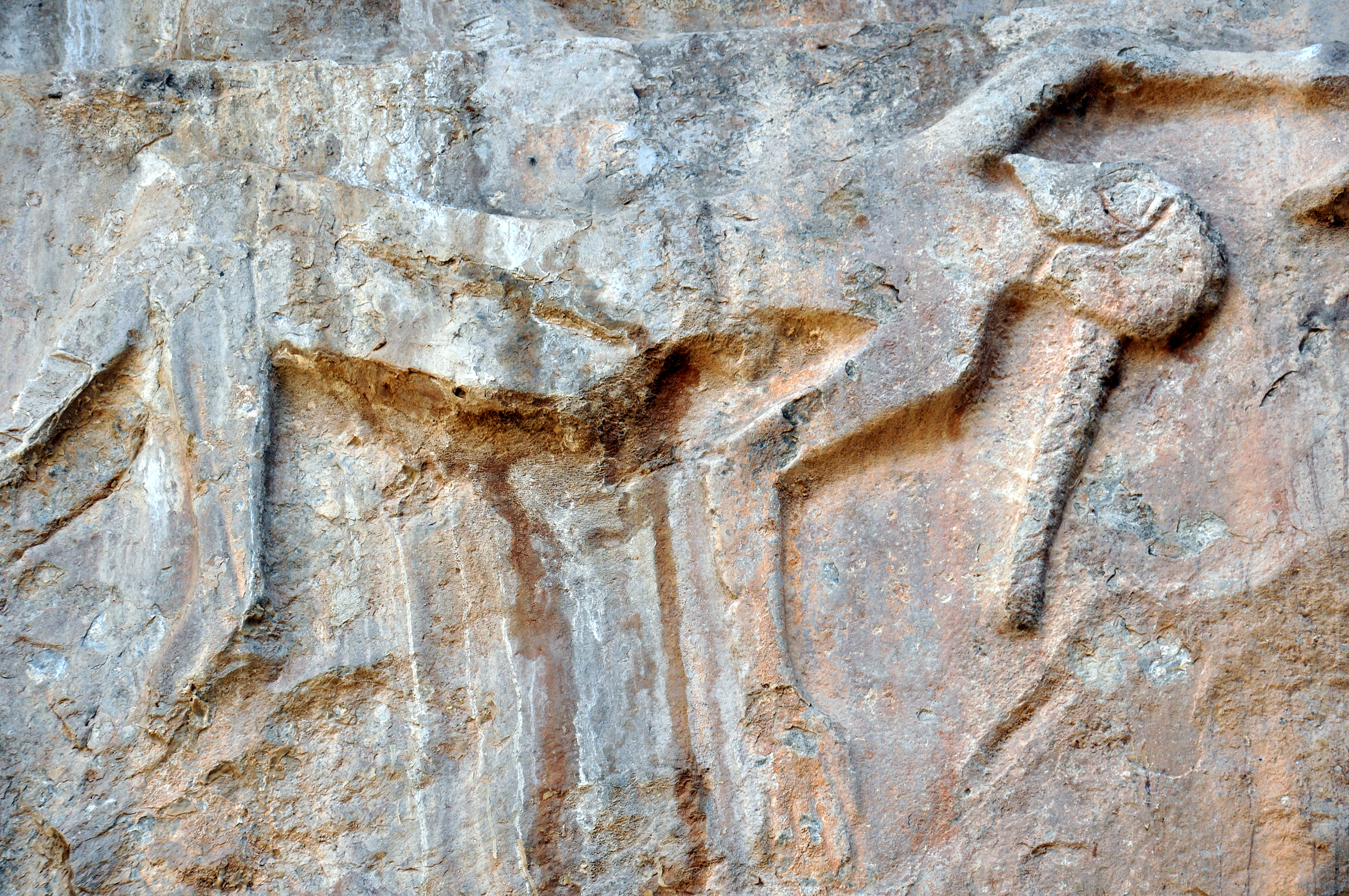
Detail, a dead or dying Lullubian warrior. Darband-i Gawr rock-relief, Mt. Qaradagh, Sulaymaniyah, Iraq, 2200-2000 BCE

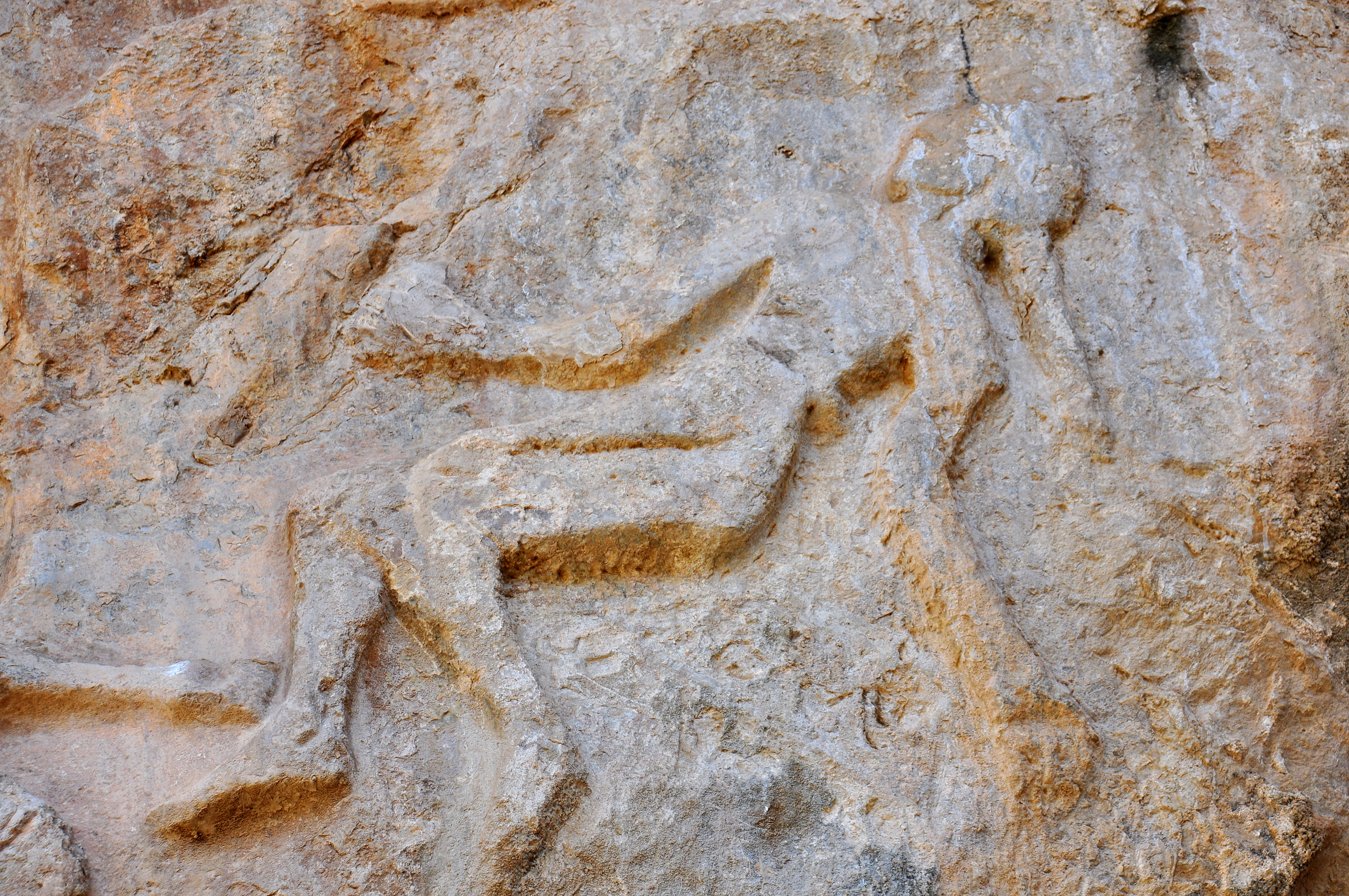
Detail, a dead or dying Lullubian warrior, Darband-i Gawr rock-relief, Mt. Qaradagh, Sulaymaniyah, Iraq, 2200-2000 BCE

== Language ==
Lullubian
- Lullubean
- Native to: Lullubi Kingdom, Iran and Iraq
- Region: Zagros Mountains
- Ethnicity: Lullubi
- Extinct: 7th century BC
- Language family: unclassified Hurro-Urartian? Indo-European?

Language codes
- ISO 639-3: None (mis)
- Glottolog: None

The language of the Lullubi is regarded as an unclassified language because it is unattested in written record. However, the term Lullubi significantly appears to be of Hurrian origin rather than Semitic or Indo-European, which had yet to arrive in the region, and the names of its known rulers have Hurrian or more rarely Semitic influence, with no trace of Indo-European influence such as Iranic or Indo-Aryan.

== See also ==
- Anobanini rock relief
- Zamua
- Tell Kunara

== Sources ==
- Sar-e Pol-e Zahab
- Lullubi
- Qashqai, Hamidreza, Chronicle of early Iran history, Tehran, Avegan press, 2011 (in Persian: گاهنمای سپیده دم تاریخ در ایران )
- Cameron, George, "History of Early Iran", Chicago, 1936 (repr., Chicago, 1969; tr. E.-J. Levin, L’histoire de l’Iran antique, Paris, 1937; tr. H. Anusheh, ایران در سپیده دم تاریخ, Tehran, 1993)
- D’yakonov, I. M., "Istoriya Midii ot drevenĭshikh vremen do kontsa IV beka de e.E" (The history of Media from ancient times to the end of the 4th century BCE), Moscow and Leningrad, 1956; tr. Karim Kešāvarz as Tāriḵ-e Mād, Tehran, 1966.
- The Cambridge History of Iran
- Hinz, W., "The Lost World of Elam", London, 1972 (tr. F. Firuznia, دنیای گمشده ایلام, Tehran, 1992)
- The Cambridge Ancient History
- Majidzadeh, Yusef, "History and civilization of Elam", Tehran, Iran University Press, 1991.
- Majidzadeh, Yusef, "History and civilization of Mesopotamia", Tehran, Iran University Press, 1997, vol.1.
- Legrain, Leon, "Historical Fragments", Philadelphia, The University of Pennsylvania Museum Publications of the Babylonian Section, vol. XIII, 1922.
- Vallat, Francois. Elam: The History of Elam. Encyclopaedia Iranica, vol. VIII pp. 301-313. London/New York, 1998.
