= Victory Stele of Naram-Sin =

Akkadian stele

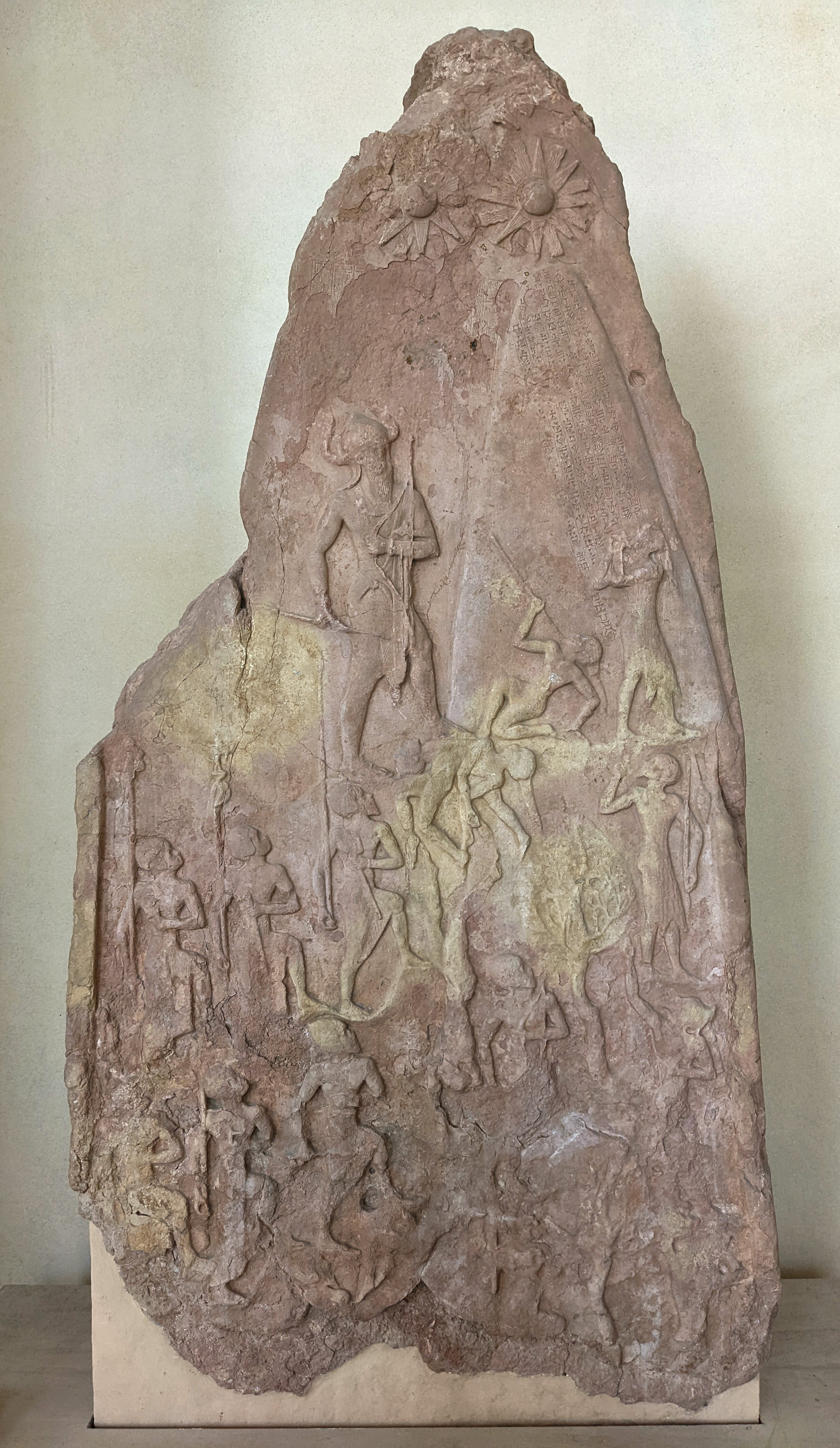
- Victory of Naram-Sin over the mountain tribe of the Lullubi and their king Satuni, Louvre Museum
- Material: Limestone
- Height: c. 3 meters (original); 2 meters
- Width: 1.5 meters
- Created: c. 2250 BC in Sippar
- Discovered: 1898; Shush, Khuzestan, Iran
- Discovered by: Jacques de Morgan
- Present location: Paris, Ile-de-France, France
- Identification: Sb 4

Original location of the stele, in Sippar, Mesopotamia, modern Iraq, before being moved to Susa, Iran, by Shutruk-Nakhunte in the 12th century BC

The Victory Stele of Naram-Sin is a stele that dates to approximately 2254–2218 BC, in the time of the Akkadian Empire, and is now at the Louvre in Paris. The relief measures 2 meters in height (6' 7") and was carved in pinkish limestone, with cuneiform writings in Akkadian and Elamite. It depicts King Naram-Sin of Akkad leading the Akkadian army to victory over the Lullubi, a mountain people from the Zagros Mountains.

The stele shows a narrative scene of the king crossing the steep slopes into enemy territory; on the left are the ordered imperial forces keeping in rank while marching over the disordered defenders that lie broken and defeated. Naram-Sin is shown as by far the most important figure, towering over his enemy and troops and all eyes gaze up toward him. The weak and chaotic opposing forces are shown being thrown from atop the mountainside, impaled by spears, fleeing and begging Naram-Sin for mercy as well as being trampled underfoot by Naram-Sin himself. This is supposed to convey their uncivilized and barbaric nature making the conquest justified. Though currently about two meters in height, estimates of its original height range up to three meters.

== Style ==
The stele is unique in two regards. Most conquest depictions are shown horizontally, with the king being at the top-center. This stele depicts the victory in a diagonal fashion with the king still being at the top-center but where everyone else can look up to him. The second unique aspect of the piece is that Naram-Sin is shown wearing a bull-horned helmet or shown as the face of lion. Helmets of this type at the time when this stele was commissioned were only worn by the Gods. This stele is in essence telling the viewer that Naram-Sin is a victorious conqueror as a result of his divine status. It also shows Naram-Sin gazing up toward two stars, showing that although Naram-Sin is a god, a feat that was up to this point only achieved by deceased kings, he is still not the most powerful of gods.

== Rediscovery ==
The stele is believed to originally be from Sippar, but was found at the Iranian site of Susa. It was taken out of Mesopotamia by the Elamite King Shutruk-Nakhunte in the 12th century BC. Shutruk-Nakhunte was a descendant of the Lullubi people, whose defeat the stele commemorated. He also claimed to carry the stele there himself. The already ancient inscription was kept, indicating respect for Naram-Sin's victory. He did, however, add an Elamite cuneiform inscription declaring his own glory and tells how the stele was carried out of the city after the pillage of the city Sippar. In 1898, Jacques de Morgan, a French archaeologist, excavated the stele and it was moved to the Louvre in Paris, where it remains today.

== Inscriptions ==
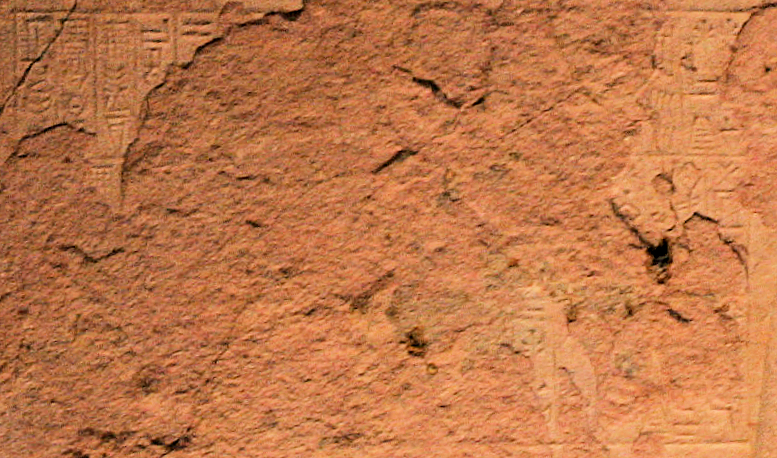
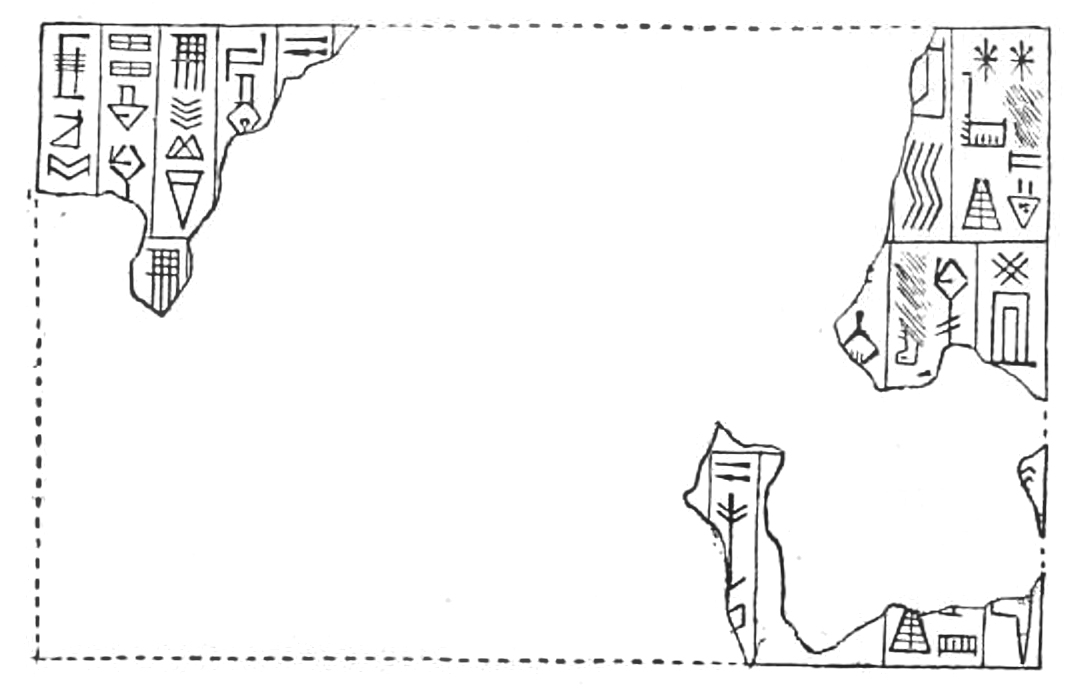
Naram-Sin stele, inscription of Naram-Sin in the Akkadian language. The name Naram-Sin (𒀭𒈾𒊏𒄠𒀭𒂗𒍪) appears vertically in the upper right box.

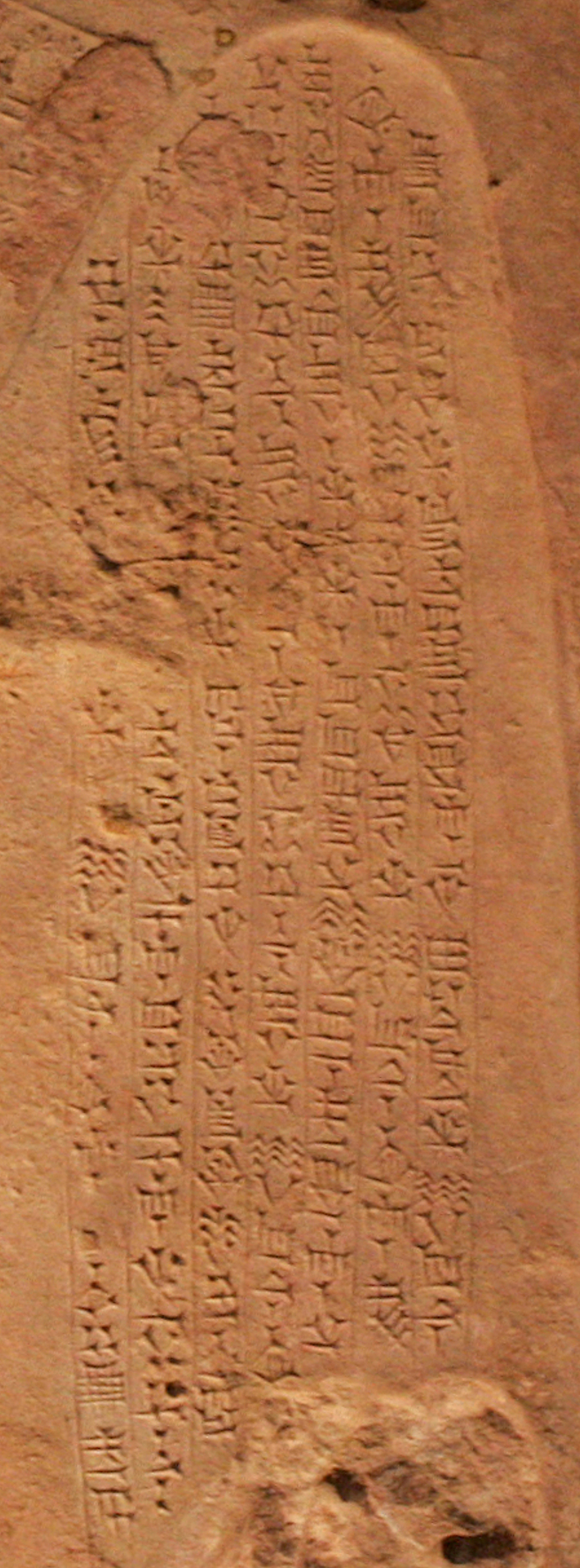
Naram-Sin stele, inscription of Shutruk-Nahhunte in Elamite

The inscription over the head of King Naram-Sin is in Akkadian language and script and fragmentary, but reads:

"Naram-Sin the powerful . . . . Sidur and Sutuni, princes of the Lullubi, gathered together and they made war against me."

— Akkadian inscription of Naram-Sin.

The second inscription, to the right over the mountainous cone, is in Elamite and was written around 1,000 years later by Shutruk-Nahhunte who took the stele and brought it with him to Elam:

"I am Shutruk-Nahhunte, son of Hallutush-Inshushinak, beloved servant of the god Inshushinak, king of Anshan and Susa, who has enlarged the kingdom, who takes care of the lands of Elam, the lord of the land of Elam. When the god Inshusinak gave me the order, I defeated Sippar. I took the stele of Naram-Sin and carried it off, bringing it to the land of Elam. For Inshushinak, my god, I set it as an offering."

== Narrative ==
Naram-Sin is shown as a god-like figure on the stele. Naram-Sin is wearing the horned helmet showing his god-like status, and authority. He is supported by his ordered troops and feared by his defeated enemies. His face is that of lion or bull, signifying his powers. He is also depicted by showing no mercy to his enemy. One of the defeated people pleas for their lives on the top right as they run from Naram-Sin. This is for good reason because he is shown stepping on the dead body of one of the Lullubi people after kicking another off the side of the mountain. He has stabbed another in the neck with a spear and is holding an arrow to perhaps impale the next. The Lullubi people are shown in stark contrast to the Akkadian soldiers, being shown as a disorganized chaotic mess of individuals being trampled underfoot by the very organized Akkadians.

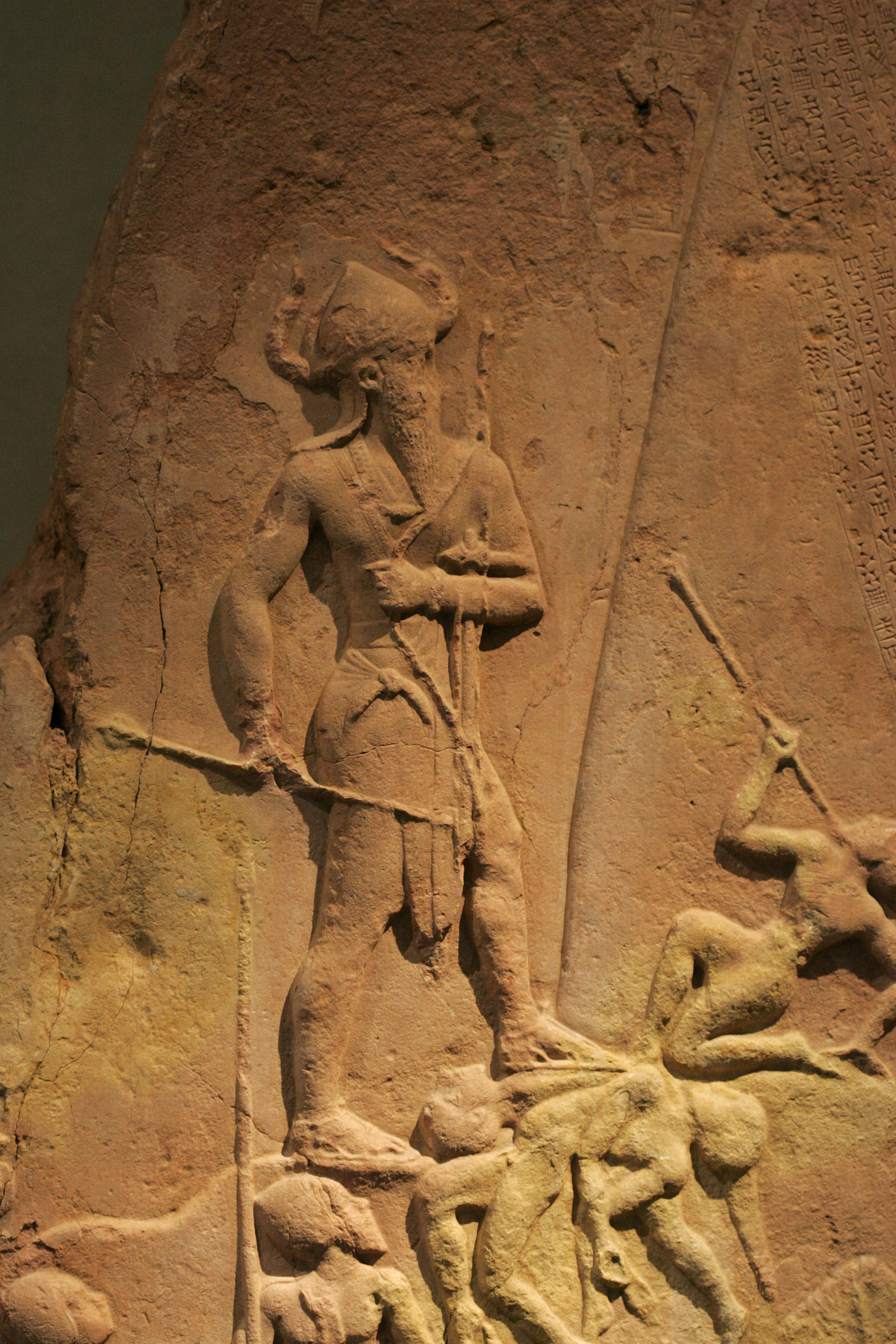
King Naram-Sin standing over Lullubian corpses (detail).

A tree native to the area is pictured between the two groups of soldiers, firstly to locate the battle in a specific place, and to help frame the stele.

The Lullubi grovel before the conqueror who has destroyed them and will show no mercy. They are depicted as a broken group lacking discipline, conveying their uncivilized and barbaric nature, which in turn justified the conquest. They were seen as uncivilized and barbaric and the much stronger Akkadians deserve to rule over them. It is also there to strike fear into the hearts of any rebels that wish to challenge the rule of the King. This shows his lack of mercy and that any resistance is futile.

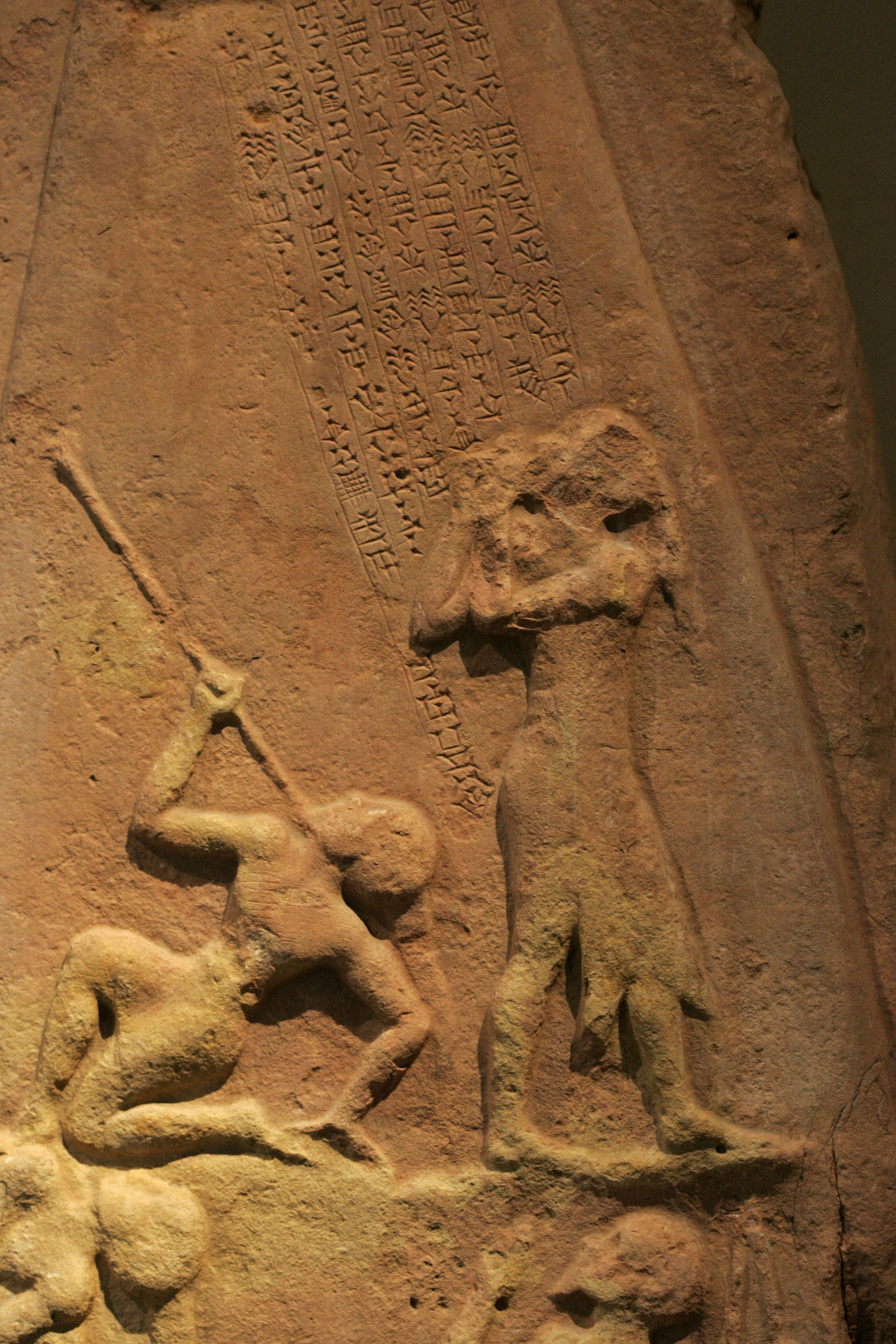
The Lullubi king Satuni appears standing to the right, imploring the Akkadian king to spare him (detail). Lullubi victims are usually shown with pointed beards and long braided hair.

When a figure is shown wearing a horned helmet in Akkadian art at the time they would have commonly been considered a god. Here Naram-Sin is wearing just such a helmet to show the viewer that he is a god-king. Divinity is further represented in the three sun-stars pictured above the mountain top. Although there are indeed three stars, only two can be seen due to the fact that the stele was damaged at some point in its existence, effectively removing the third star. The sun-stars consist of a series of eight point stars which have flames radiating between the points. These are meant to represent the Akkadian god, Shamash, watching over the battle between the Akkadians and Lullubi people.

The low depth, typical of similar reliefs, is unusual in the diagonal composition (compare the scenes on the Standard of Ur). This was perhaps to create a more interesting composition or to perhaps allow everyone depicted in the scene to look up to Naram-Sin. Naram's horned helmet and much larger size show him as powerful and godly. Perhaps given his divine and godly power, the sun could have been the god to give him his power.

The text under the sun was written in Akkadian cuneiform and depicts the rise of the Akkadians over the Lullubians. Naram-Sin leading his army into destroying the last of the Lullubians shows just how powerful the Akkadians and Naram-Sin truly are and they are not a group to reckon with. Naram-Sin thought of himself as godly, which explains his depiction as very god-like.

Alternatively, the stele may depict a campaign to Cilicia; the strongest indication of this is the form of the booty—a metal vessel—carried by one of Naram-Sin's soldiers. Completely foreign to Mesopotamia, the vessel closely resembles Anatolian crafts from Troy and Cilicia. These vessels—ceramic or metal—were produced during the Early Bronze III Period, which is around the time of Naram-Sin's rule.

== Details ==
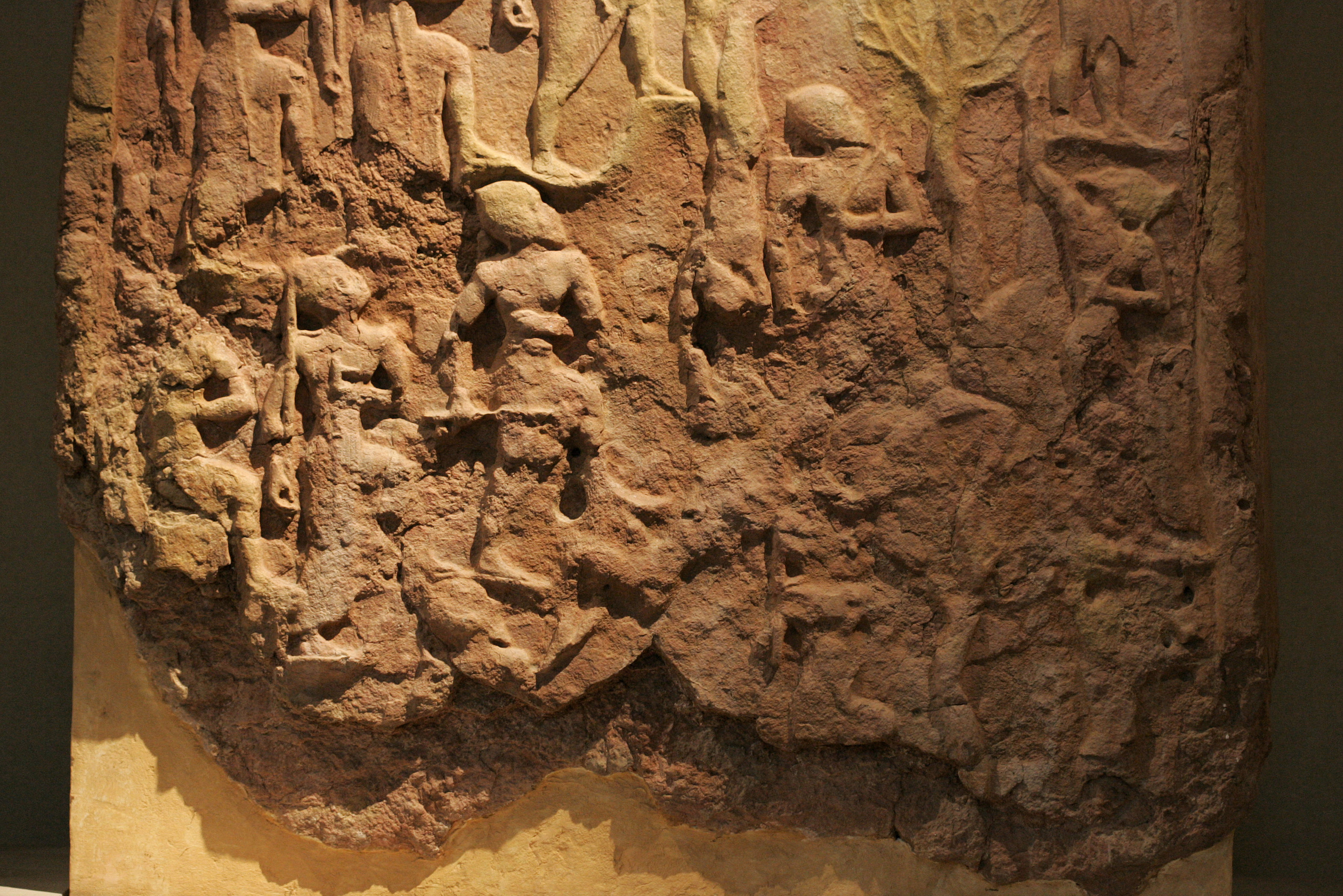
Lower section

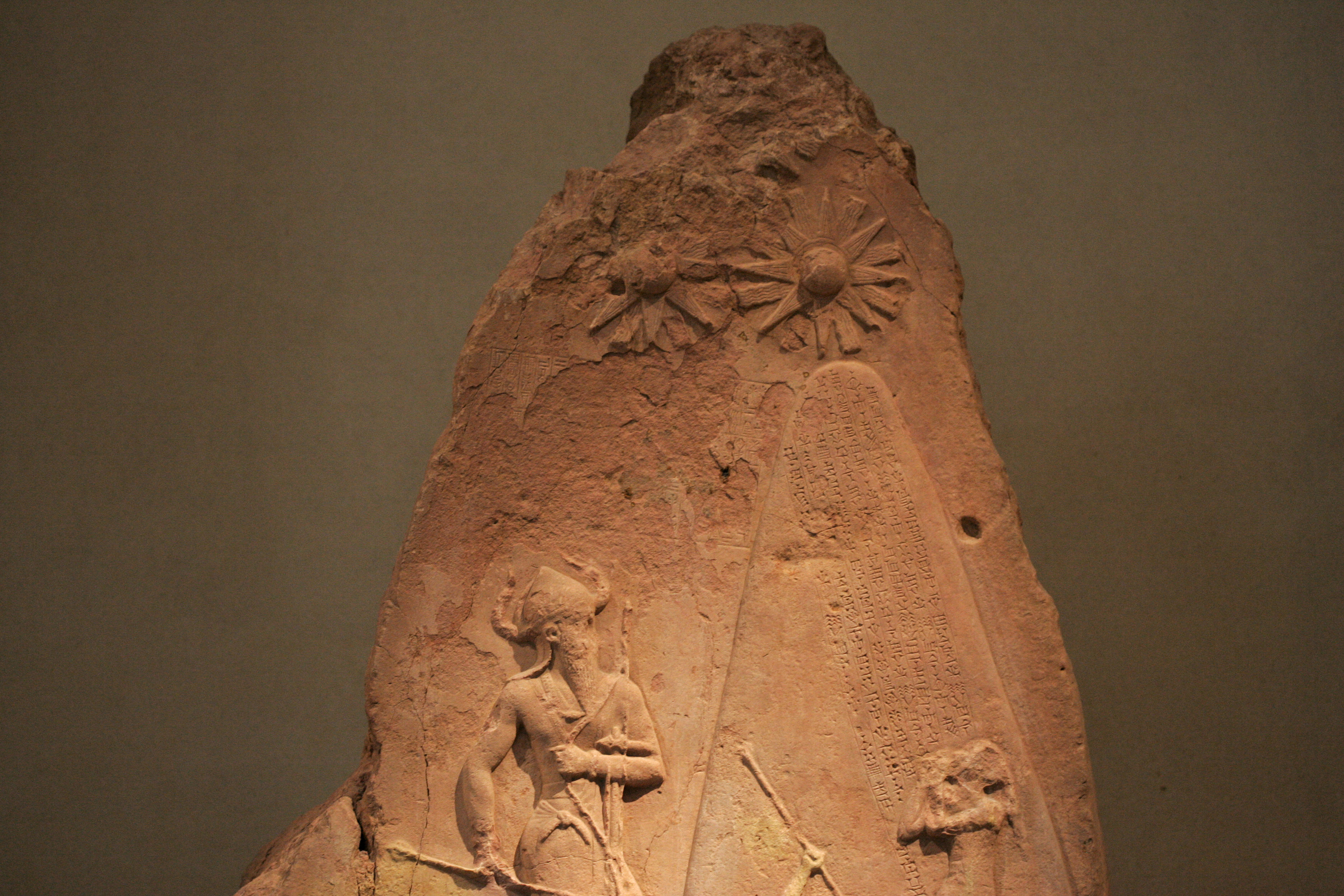
The stars

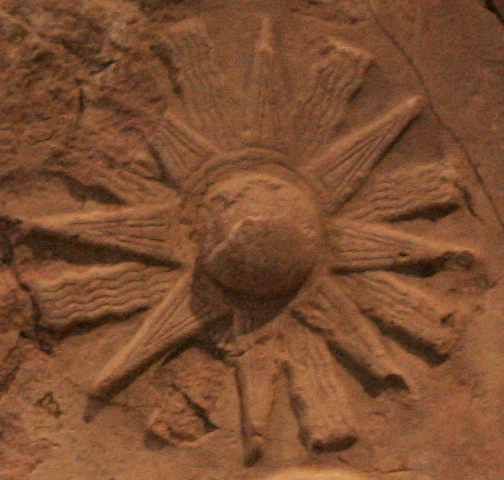
Star

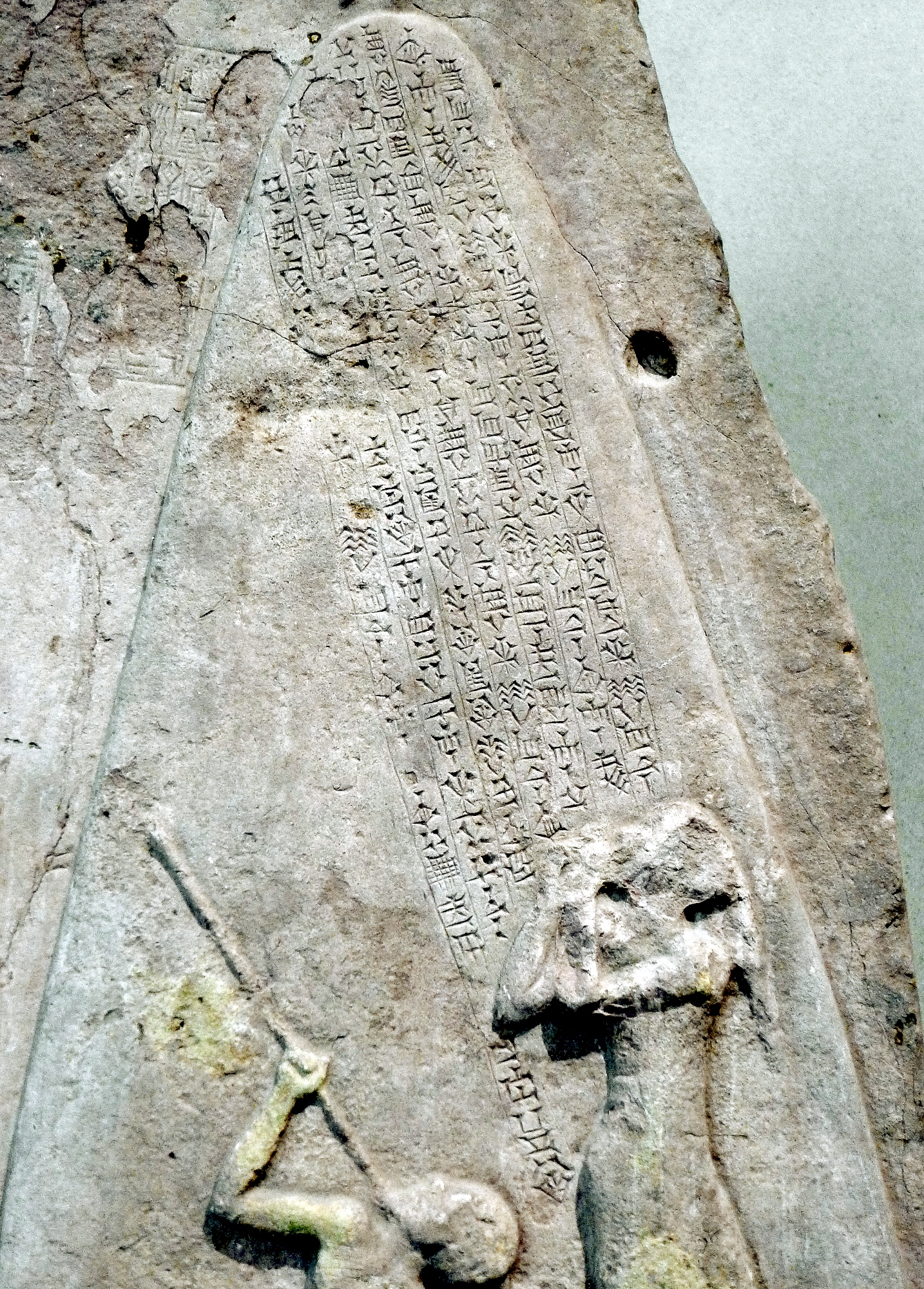
Inscription of Shutruk-Nakhunte, 12th century BC
