= Satuni =

King or prince of Lullubi kingdom

Satuni 𒊓𒌅𒉌
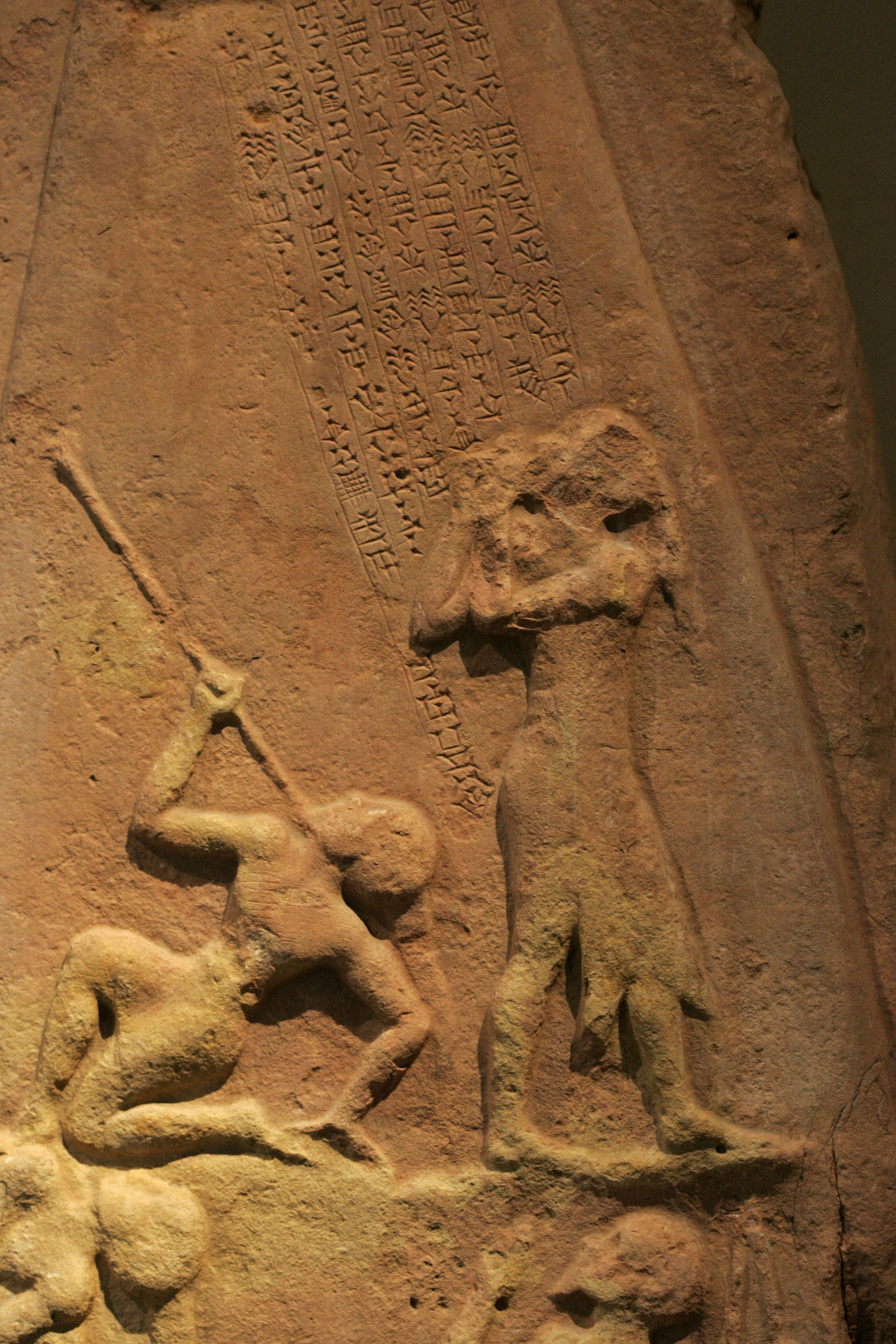
- Portion of the Victory Stele of Naram-Sin showing the defeat of the Lullubi led by Satuni. Satuni appears standing to the right, imploring the Akkadian king to spare him.
- Allegiance: Lullubi tribe
- Service years: c. 2270 BC

Satuni, or Sutuni (Akkadian: 𒊓𒌅𒉌: Sa-tu-ni; fl. c. 2270 BC), was a chief or prince of the tribal kingdom of Lullubi.

Satuni was defeated by Sargon's grandson Naram Sin, a defeat which is mentioned in the Victory Stele of Naram-Sin:

"Naram-Sin the powerful . . . . Sidur and Sutuni, princes of the Lulubi, gathered together and they made war against me."

— Akkadian inscription on the Victory Stele of Naram-Sin.

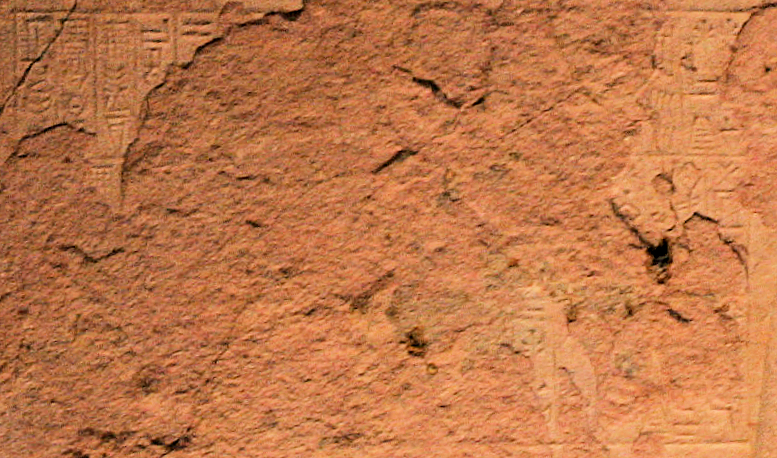
Naram-Sin stele, inscription of Naram-Sin in Akkadian, mentioning Satuni

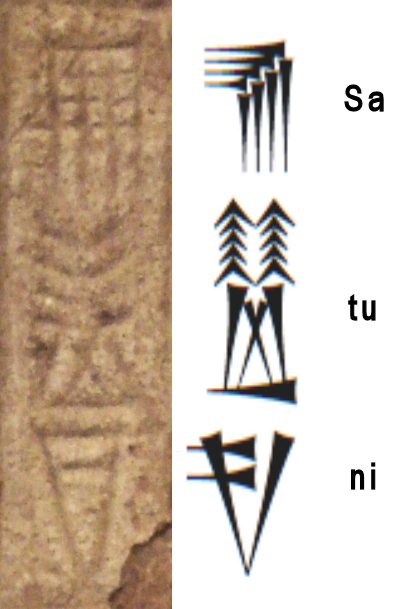
Name of Satuni of the Victory Stele of Naram-Sin (upper left corner of the Akkadian inscription)
