= Tardunni =

Coordinates: 34.87°N 45.74°E

Tar...dun...ni 𒋻...𒂅...𒉌
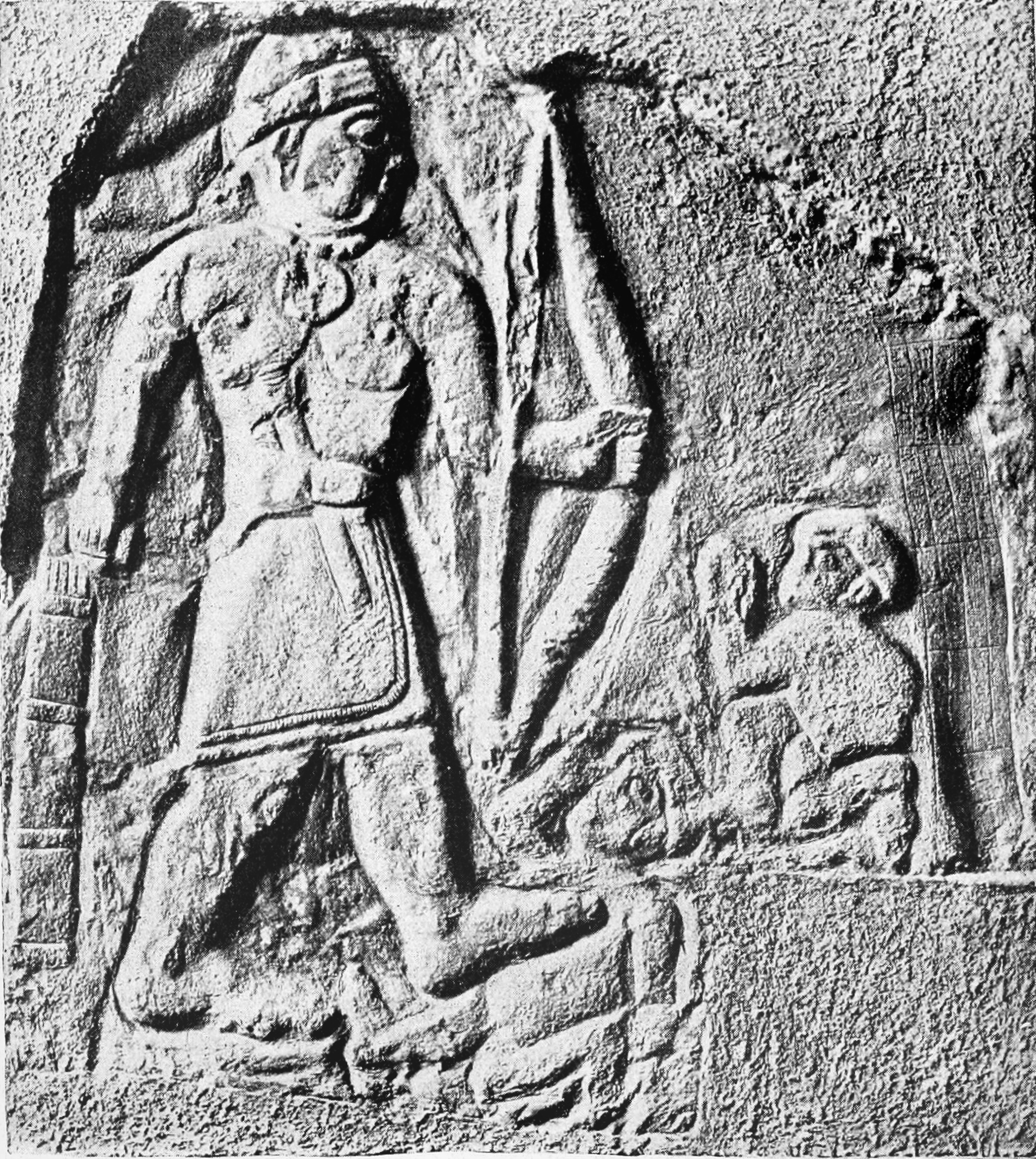
- Relief of "Tar...dunni"
- Years active: c. 2000 BC
- Parent: Ikki

Location of the Tardunni relief in Iraq

Tar...dun...ni (Cuneiform: 𒋻...𒂅...𒉌, tar...dun...ni, or Tar…ni, …birini, …irpirin) son of Ikki (also reads Ikkibshakhmat, or Ikkipshakhmat; fl. c. 2000 BC), was a king, prince, ruler, or high-ranking official of the Zagros mountains area. Although "Tardunni" is the way his name has been traditionally deciphered, he may have been called differently: it has been proposed that he was rather called Lisir Pirini, son of Ikkid Samad.

He is mainly known from a rock relief discovered in the valley of the Diyala river, in the Belula Pass, near the Lake of Darbandikhan, on the Horen Shekhan mountain (Kurdish: هۆرێن و شێخان; Arabic هورين- شيخان), in the extreme northeast of Iraq, near the border with Iran.

Very little is known about Tardunni. He was probably a ruler of the Lullubi mountain tribe. Some of their reliefs are known around 55 kilometers away, such as the Anubanini rock relief, which are very similar to the relief of Tardunni. Another opinion suggests that he was a Gutian.

In his relief, he is seen wearing weapons and trampling enemies. On the side, the relief has an inscription in Akkadian, invoking the protection of the deities Shamash and Adad:

"Tar...dunni, prefect (?), son of Sin (?)-Ipshah, all this image was replaced. As it was falling apart, he restored it. Anybody who destroys this image, his race, his name will be eradicated by Shamash and Adad!"

— Inscription of Tardunni.

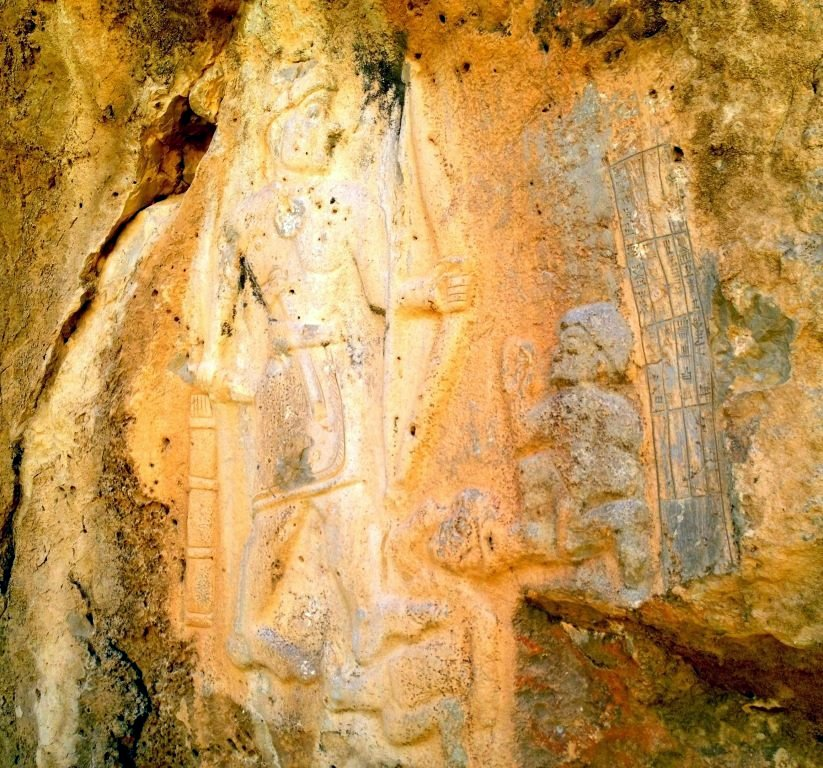
Rock-relief of Darband-i Belula at Horen Shekhan, Sulaymaniyah, Iraq

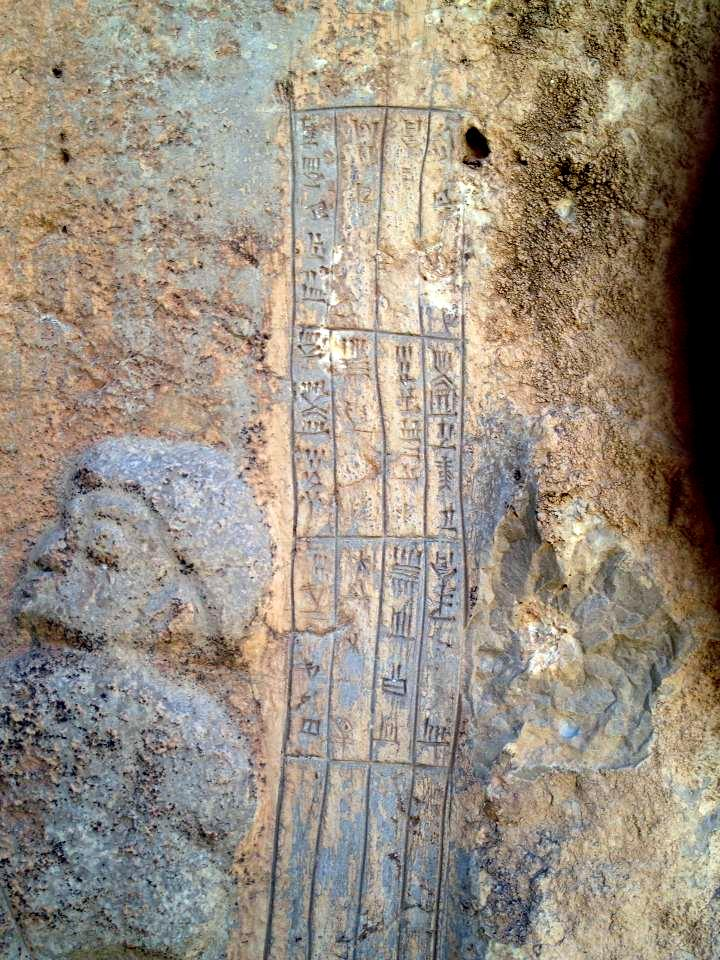
Akkadian script of the rock-relief of Darband-i Belula, Horen Shekhan, Sulaymaniyah, Iraqi Kurdistan

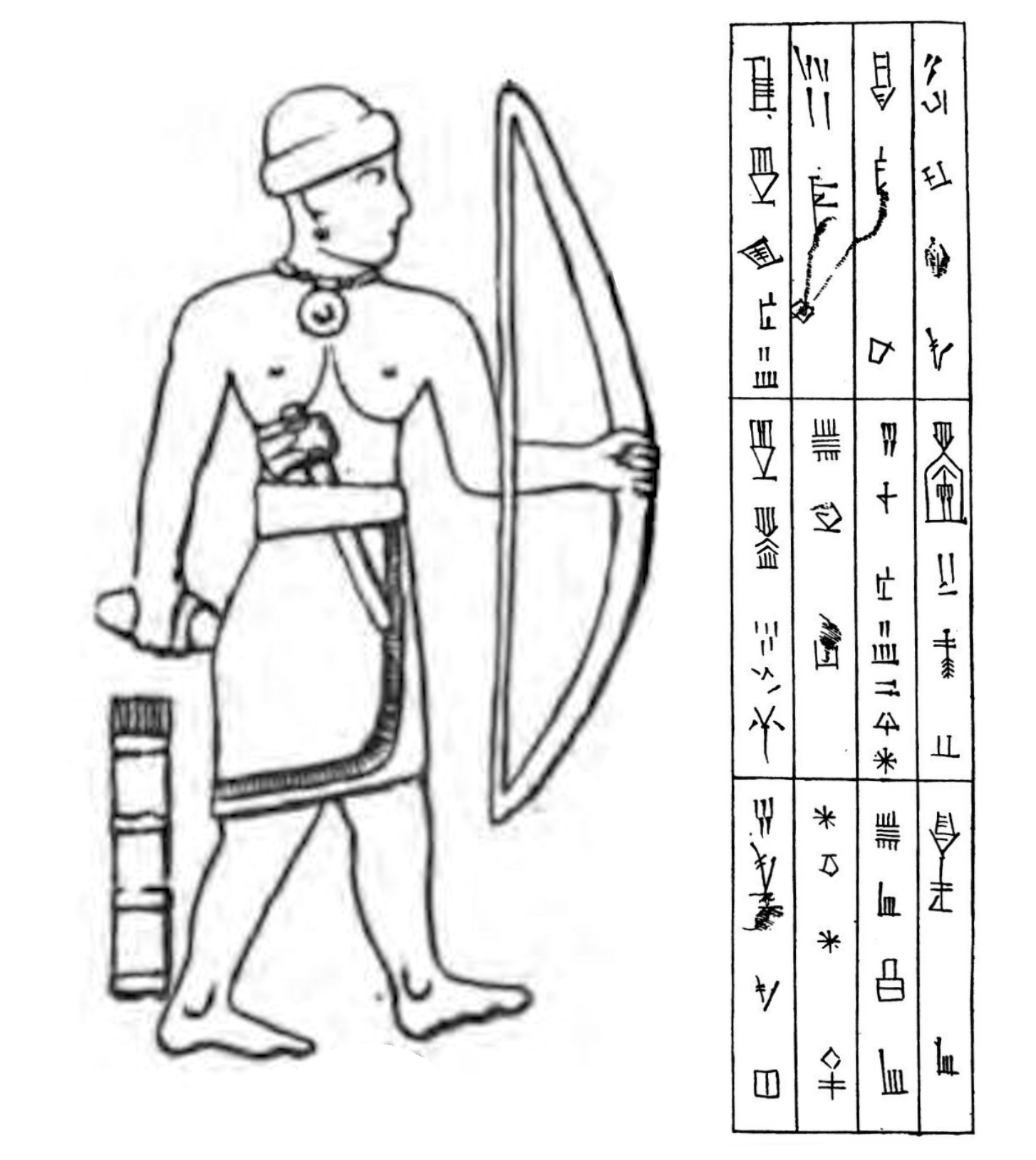
Drawing of Tardunni, and reproduction of the inscription

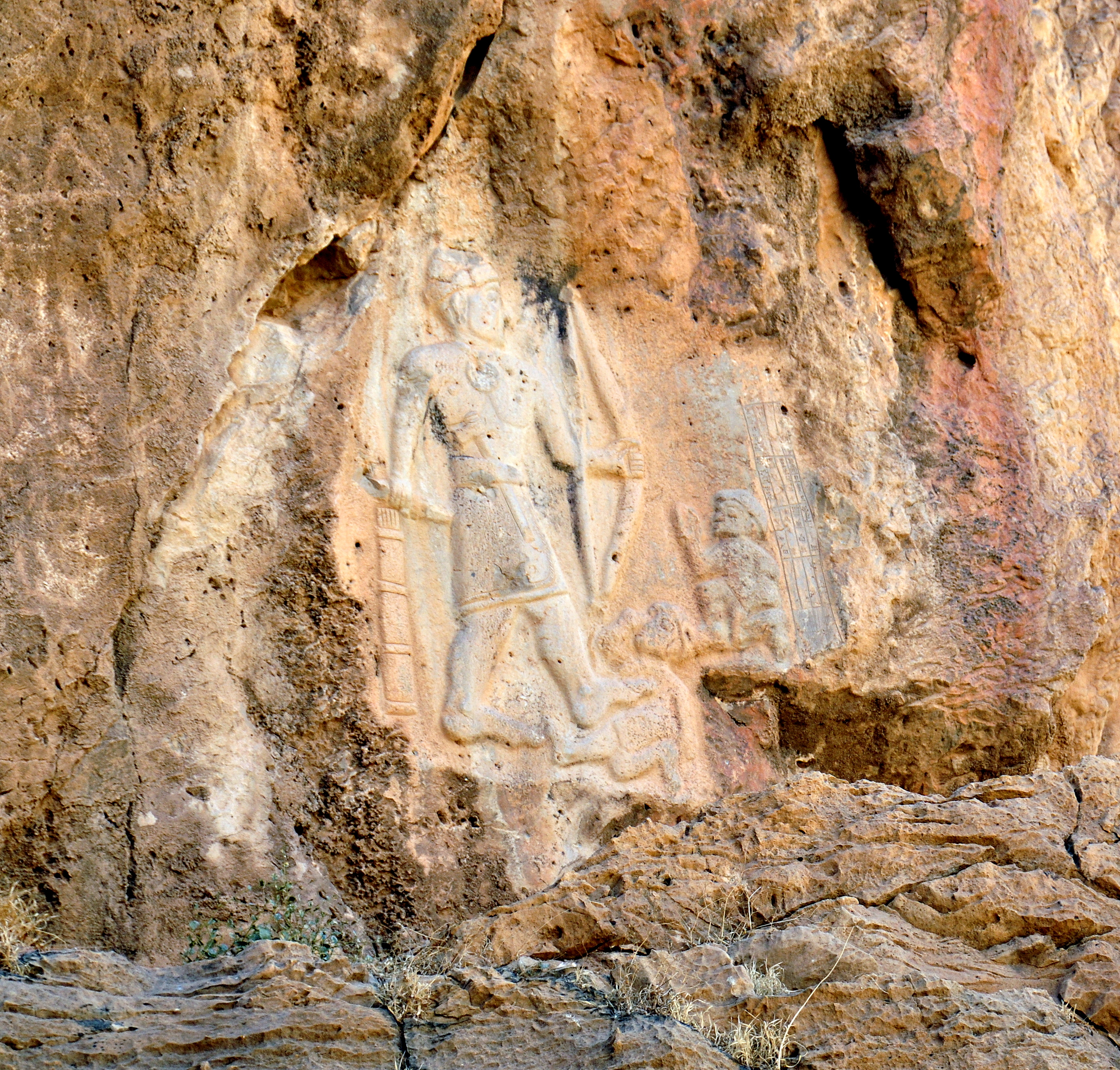
Rock-relief of "Tar...dunni" at Darband-i Belula, Horen Shekhan, Sulaymaniyah, Iraq

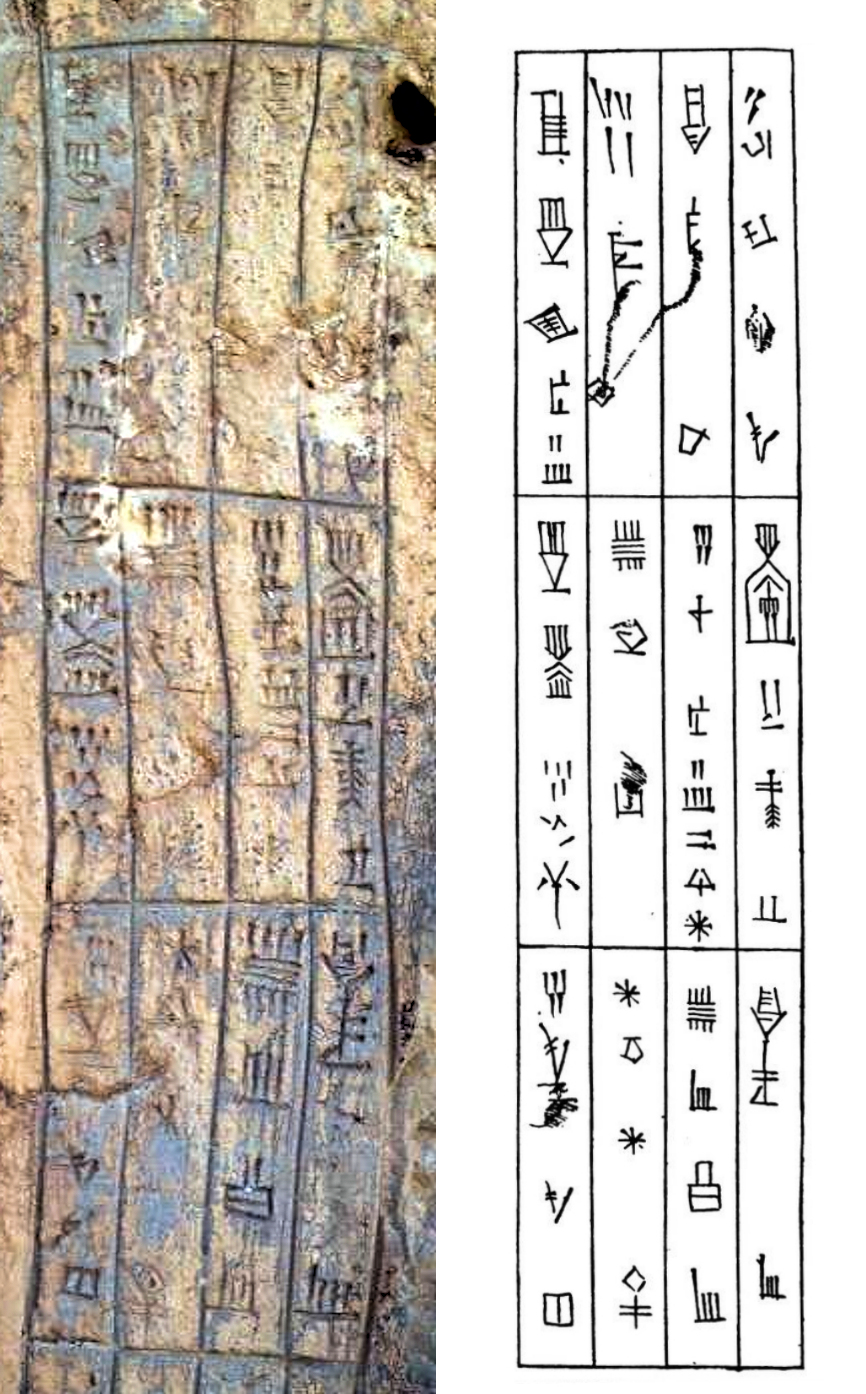
Inscription and transcription.

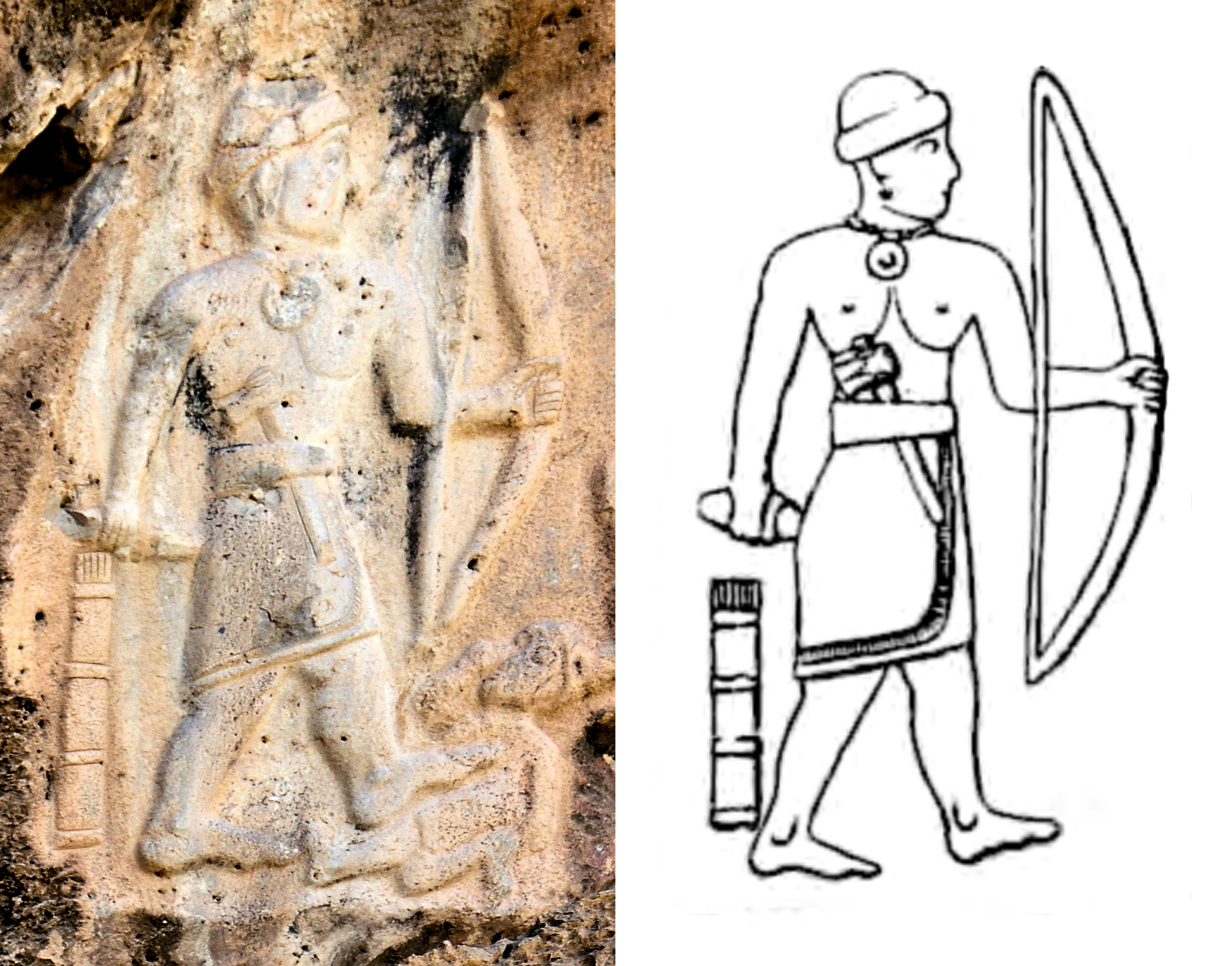
Portrait of Tardunni

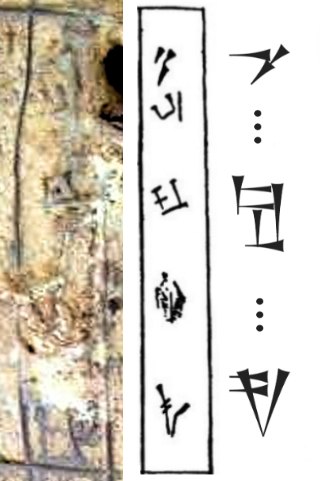
The name "Ta...dun...ni" and its proposed transcription in standard Sumero-Akkadian cuneiform

== See also ==
- Video of Tardunni's rock-relief at Darband-i Belula on YouTube.
