= Ameka =

Ameka is a surname. Notable people with the surname include:

- Felix Ameka (born 1957), Ghanaian linguist
- Louis Ameka (born 1996), Gabonese footballer

== See also ==
- Emeka
