= Shirin (disambiguation) =

Shirin (Persian: شِيرِين, romanized: shīrīn) was the wife of Sassanid Persian king Khosrow II.

Shirin may also refer to:

== People ==
- Shirin Abdullaeva (2005–2025), Uzbek singer and actress
- Shirin Abedinirad (born 1986), Iranian contemporary artist
- Shirin Akhter (born 1954), Bangladeshi politician
- Shirin Akiner (1943–2019), British historian
- Shirin Akter (born 1994), Bangladeshi sprinter
- Shirin Aliabadi (1973–2018), Iranian contemporary multidisciplinary visual artist
- Shirin van Anrooij (born 2002), Dutch racing cyclist
- Shirin Aumeeruddy-Cziffra (born 1948), Mauritian lawyer, politician and diplomat
- Shirin Bina (born 1964), Iranian actress
- Shirin Sharmin Chaudhury (born 1966), Bangladeshi politician
- Shirin Darasha (1938–2012), Indian educator
- Shirin David (born 1995), German rapper, singer and songwriter, and entrepreneur
- Shirin Ebadi (born 1947), Iranian lawyer and Nobel Prize winner
- Shirin Fozdar (1905–1992), Indian women's rights activist
- Shirin Gerami (born 1988/89), Iranian triathlete
- Shirin Guha (born 1986), Indian actress
- Shirin Guild (born 1946), Iranian fashion designer
- Shirin Kanchwala, Indian model and actress
- Shirin Melikova, Azerbaijani museum director
- Shirin Mirzayev (1942–1992), Azeri military officer
- Shirin Mohammad Ali, Indian actress and playback singer
- Shirin Mohseni (born 1980), Afghan politician
- Shirin Musa (born 1977), Pakistani-born Dutch politician and women's rights activist
- Shirin Neshat (born 1957), Iranian artist
- Shirin Nezammafi (born 1979), Iranian writer
- Shirin M. Rai (born 1960), Indian political scientist
- Shirin Hassani Ramazan (born 1980), Iraqi Kurdish politician
- Shirin Rouhanirad (1967–2020), Iranian physician
- Shirin Sharipov (born 1989), Uzbek Paralympic judoka
- Shirin Akter Shila, Bangladeshi model
- Shirin Shukurov (1910–1987), Azerbaijani Army soldier and war hero
- Shirin Sohani (born 1986), Iranian animation director and designer
- Shirin Sultana, Bangladeshi politician
- Shirin Taylor (born 1951), English actress
- Shirin R. Tahir-Kheli (born 1944), American political scientist and diplomat
- Shirin Towfigh (born 1971), American surgeon
- Shirin Vajifdar (died 2017), Indian classical dancer, choreographer, instructor, and critic
- Shirin Yazdanbakhsh (1949–2025), Iranian actress

== Places ==
- Qasr-e Shirin, Kermanshah Province, Iran
- Shirin, Eqlid, Iran
- Shirin, Fars, Iran
- Shirin, Kohgiluyeh and Boyer-Ahmad, Iran
- Shirin, Razavi Khorasan, Iran
- Shirin, Sistan and Baluchestan, Iran
- Shirin, Uzbekistan

== Other uses ==
- Shirin Farhad (disambiguation), story about the Sassanid queen
- Shirin (crater), a crater located on Saturn's moon Enceladus
- Shirin (film), an Iranian film
- USS Shirin (SP-915), a United States Navy ship

== See also ==
- Shireen (disambiguation)
