= Farhad =

Persian male given name

Farhad (فرهاد)
- Pronunciation: fæɾˈhɒːd
- Gender: Male
- Language: Persian origin, also used in Turkic languages

Origin
- Origin: Iranian

Other names
- Variant forms: Phraates, Ferhad, Ferhat, Farkhad, Farrad, Forhad

Farhad (Persian: فرهاد, romanized: Farhād), also spelt Ferhad, Ferhod, Farhod or Ferhat, is a common Persian male name used since the Parthians, first recorded for Arsacid kings circa 170 BC. Variants of the name are also commonly found in other countries with historical Persian influences such as Afghanistan, Tajikistan, Uzbekistan and the Xinjiang autonomous region of China.

== Etymology ==
Modern Persian name Farhād (فرهاد) is derived from Middle Persian Frahād (in Parthian: 𐭐𐭓𐭇𐭕 prht Frahāt; in Ancient Greek: Φραάτης Phraatēs), ultimately from Old Iranian *fra-hāta- "merited, obtained".

== Places ==
- Farhad, Nishapur – a village in Nishapur County, Razavi Khorasan Province, Iran
- Farhād Tarāsh – a rockface on Mount Behistun, Iran
- Farkhad Dam - hydroelectric plant at Tajikistan/Uzbekistan border

== Literature ==
- Farhad (Persian literature)

== People with the given name Farhad ==
- Farhad I Phraates I of Parthia c. 176–171 BC
- Farhad II Phraates II of Parthia c. 138–127 BC
- Farhad III Phraates III of Parthia c. 70–57 BC
- Farhad IV Phraates IV of Parthia c. 38–2 BC
- Farhad V Phraates V of Parthia (Phraataces) c. 2 BC–AD 4
- Farhad Beg (died 1589), Iranian administrator
- Farkhad Akhmedov (born 1955), Russian businessman of Azerbaijani origin
- Farhad Aliyev (born 1963), Azerbaijani politician
- Farhad Ahmed Kanchan, Bangladeshi politician and freedom fighter
- Farhad Badalbeyli (born 1947), Azerbaijani pianist and composer
- Farkhat Bazarov (born 1980), Russian footballer
- Farhad Daftary (born 1938), Ismaili scholar
- Farhad Darya (born 1962), Afghan singer
- Farhad Fakhreddini (born 1938), Iranian composer
- Farhad Hossain (cricketer) (born 1987), Bangladeshi cricketer
- Farhad Hossain (born 1972), Bangladeshi academic and politician
- Farhad Karibov (1952-2024), Azerbaijani lawyer and politician
- Farhad Kazemi (born 1959), Iranian football manager
- Farhad Khan, Mughal faujdar of Sylhet and Chittagong
- Farhad Khoiee-Abbasi, public protester in Chicago
- Farkhad Magametov (born 1962), Uzbek footballer
- Farhad Majidi (born 1976), Iranian footballer
- Farhad Manjoo (born 1978), American journalist and author
- Farhad Mazhar (born 1947), Bangladeshi poet
- Farhad Mehrad (1944-2002), Iranian singer
- Farhad Moshiri (born 1955), British-Iranian businessman
- Farhad Rahbar (born 1959), Iranian politician
- Farhad Veliyev (born 1980), Azerbaijani footballer
- Farhad Reza (born 1986), Bangladeshi cricketer
- Farhad Shetul, Bangladeshi hockey player
- Bodruddoza Md. Farhad Hossain (born 1971), Bangladeshi politician
- Md. Forhad Hossain, Bangladeshi academic and vice-chancellor
- Farhad Jahangiri Manesh, Artist and Student

== People with the surname Farhad ==
- Ariful Kabir Farhad (born 1980), Bangladeshi professional footballer
- Kamilla Farhad (born 1996), Azerbaijani tennis player
- Maria Farhad (born 2001), Iraqi beauty pageant winner
- Md. Mazbauddin Farhad (born 1963), Bangladesh politician
- Mohamed Farhad (born 1999), Maldivian singer
- Mohammad Farhad (1938-1987), Bangladesh politician
- Massumeh Farhad, American curator and art historian
- Sayed Farhad, Kuwaiti judoka
- Zafrul Hasan Farhad (1953-2017), Bangladeshi politician

== See also ==
- Shirin Farhad, disambiguation page
- Phraates, the name of 5 kings in the Arsacid Empire
- Aphrahat, 3rd-century Syriac Christian monk and ascetic
