= Sherine (name) =

- Pronunciation: Shee-RENE
- Gender: Female

Origin
- Origin: Iran
- Meaning: sweet, pleasant

Other names
- Related names: Shirin, Şirin, Shireen, Sherin

Sherine (Persian: شيرين, lit. 'Sweet'), Sherene, or Shereen, is a female given name, of Persian language origins. It is popular in Iran, Afghanistan, Tajikistan and other Persian speaking countries. It is used in the Arab world as well as South Asia. Notable people with the name include:

== Given name ==
=== Shereen ===
- Shereen Ahmed, American actress and singer of Egyptian descent
- Shereen Arazm (born 1972), Canadian restaurateur, nightclub owner, and television personality
- Shereen Audi (born 1970), Jordanian visual artist
- Shereen Bhan (born 1976), Indian journalist and news anchor
- Shereen Cutkelvin (born 1996), Scottish singer, presenter, and actress
- Shereen Seif El-Nasr (1967–2024), Egyptian film and television actress
- Shereen El Feki (born 1968), British journalist and author
- Shereen Flax-Charles, British Virgin Islands politician
- Shereen Martineau, Irish actress
- Shereen Marisol Meraji (born 1977), American journalist, podcaster, and educator
- Shereen Miranda (born 1982, British house singer songwriter, actress, author, producer, and presenter
- Shereen Nanjiani (born 1961), Scottish radio presenter
- Shereen Ratnagar (1944–2026), Indian archaeologist
- Shereen Reda (born 1968), Egyptian actress
- Shereen Usdin (born 1962), South African activist
- Shereen Samson Vallabouy (born 1998), Malaysian athlete

=== Sherine ===
- Sherine (born 1980), Egyptian singer, actress, and TV show host
- Sherine Abeyratne (born 1961), Australian singer
- Sherine El-Zeiny (born 1991), Dutch-Egyptian artistic gymnast
- Sherine Gabriel, Egyptian–Canadian rheumatologist and administrator
- Sherine Obare, American chemist
- Sherine Tadros (born 1980), British journalist
- Sherine Wagdy (born 1969), Egyptian singer
- Sherine Wong (born 1979), Malaysian model

== Surname ==
- Ariane Sherine (born 1980), British musical stand-up comedian, comedy writer and journalist

== See also ==
- Shirin (disambiguation)
- Arabic name
- Persian name
