= Ferhat =

Ferhat is an Arabic name which is popular among Maghreb countries, the name might be derived from the word "ferah" which means "joy." Therefore, Ferhat can be interpreted as "joyful" or "happy." Its variant is Firhad. It may refer to:

== Given name ==
=== Ferhad ===
- Ferhad Ayaz (born 1994), Turkish-Swedish footballer
- Ferhad Pasha Sokolović, 16th-century Ottoman general and statesman of Bosniak origin
- Serdar Ferhad Pasha, 16th-century Ottoman grand vizier

=== Ferhat ===
- Ferhat Abbas (1899–1985), Algerian political leader
- Ferhat Abdi Şahin (born 1967), YPG supreme commander
- Ferhat Encü (born 1985), Kurdish imprisoned politician
- Ferhat Akbaş (born 1986), Turkish volleyball coach and former volleyball player
- Ferhat Akdeniz (born 1986), Turkish volleyball player
- Ferhat Arıcan (born 1993), Turkish male artistic gymnast
- Ferhat Atik (born 1971), Turkish Cypriot filmmaker
- Ferhat Bakal (born 1998), Turkish ice hockey player
- Ferhat Bey Draga (1880–1944), Kosovo Albanian politician
- Ferhat Bıkmaz (born 1988), Turkish footballer
- Ferhat Çerçi (born 1981), Turkish-German footballer
- Ferhat Çökmüş (born 1985), Turkish footballer
- Ferhat Görgülü (born 1991), Turkish-Dutch footballer
- Ferhat Güven (born 1983), Turkish-Norwegian politician
- Farhat Hached (1914-1952), Tunisian trade unionist
- Ferhat Kaplan (born 1989), Turkish footballer
- Ferhat Kaya (born 1986), Turkish-Belgian footballer
- Ferhat Kiraz (born 1989), Turkish footballer
- Ferhat Kıskanç (born 1982), Turkish-German footballer
- Ferhat Korkmaz (born 1981), Turkish-Swedish footballer
- Ferhat Mehenni (born 1951), Algerian singer and politician
- Ferhat Odabaşı (born 1983), Turkish footballer
- Ferhat Ozcep (born 1968), Turkish geophysicist and historian
- Ferhat Öztorun (born 1987), Turkish footballer
- Ferhat Pehlivan (born 1988), Turkish amateur boxer
- Ferhat Tunç (born 1964), Kurdish singer
- Ferhat Yazgan (born 1992), Turkish footballer

== Surname ==
- Halima Ferhat, Moroccan female historian
- Zinedine Ferhat (born 1993), Algerian footballer

== Other uses ==
- Farhad and Shirin Monument, a monument in Amasya, Turkey
- Ferhadija Mosque in Sarajevo, a mosque in Sarajevo, Bosnia and Herzegovina
- Ferhat Pasha Mosque, a mosque in Banja Luka, Bosnia and Herzegovina
- Jijel Ferhat Abbas Airport, an airport near Jijel, Algeria
