= Sherin =

Sherin is a feminine given name and surname of Persian origin. Notable people with the name include:

== Given name ==
- Sherin Ahmed (born 1956), Bangladeshi politician
- Sherin Al-Shalabe (born 1994), Jordanian footballer
- Sherin Francis (born 1984), Seychellois economist
- Sherin Guirguis (born 1974), visual artist
- Sherin Hanaey, Egyptian novelist and screenwriter
- Sherin Hasno (born 2007), Danish and Lebanese footballer
- Sherin Khankan (born 1974), Danish imam
- Sherin Mathews (2014–2017), Indian-American toddler
- Sherin Shringar, Indian actress
- Sherin Taama (born 1982), Egyptian rhythmic gymnast
- Sherin Zada, Pakistani journalist

== Surname ==
- Edwin Sherin (1930–2017), American-Canadian director and producer
- Justin Sherin (born 1981), American playwright, screenwriter, & political analyst
- Miriam G. Sherin, American professor
- Muhammad Sherin (born 1933), Pakistani Sufi Pir and Islamic scholar

== See also ==
- Shirin (disambiguation)
- Sherine (name)
