= Aphrahat =

4th century Syriac-Christian theologian and author

Saint Aphrahat the Persian
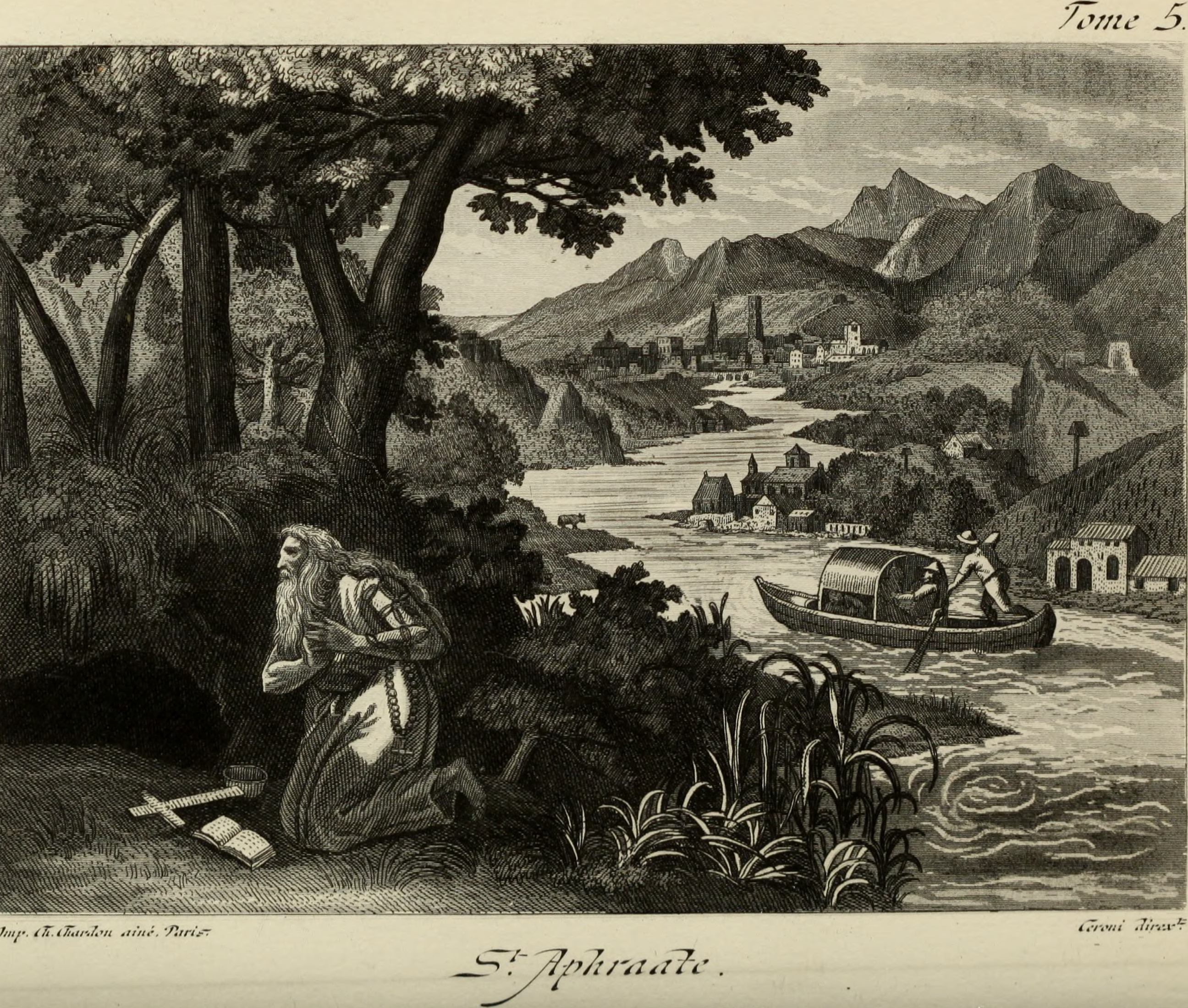
- Aphrahat depicted in Les Vies des Pères des déserts d'Orient : leur doctrine spirituelle et leur discipline monastique (1886)

Church Father Bishop, Abbot
- Born: c. 280
- Died: c. 345
- Venerated in: Catholic Church; Eastern Orthodox Church; Oriental Orthodox Church; Church of the East
- Canonized: Pre-congregation
- Major shrine: Mar Mattai Monastery
- Feast: 29 January (Roman Catholic, Eastern Orthodox, Oriental Orthodox); 20 Tobi (Coptic Orthodox)
- Attributes: Shemagh, habit
- Patronage: Erbil, Mosul

Aphrahat (c. 280–c. 345; Syriac: ܐܦܪܗܛ, Ap̄rahaṭ, Persian: فرهاد, Arabic: أفراهاط الحكيم, Ancient Greek: Ἀφραάτης, and Latin Aphraates), venerated as Saint Aphrahat the Persian, was a third-century Syriac Christian author of Iranian descent from the Sasanian Empire, who composed a series of twenty-three expositions or homilies on points of Christian doctrine and practice. All his known works, the Demonstrations, come from later on in his life. He was an ascetic and celibate, and was almost definitely a son of the covenant (an early Syriac form of communal monasticism). He may have been a bishop, and later Syriac tradition places him at the head of Mar Mattai Monastery near Mosul in what is now northern Iraq. He was a near contemporary to the slightly younger Ephrem the Syrian, but the latter lived within the sphere of the Roman Empire. Called the Persian Sage (Syriac: ܚܟܝܡܐ ܦܪܣܝܐ, Ḥakkimā Pārsāyā), Aphrahat witnessed to the concerns of the early church beyond the eastern boundaries of the Roman Empire.

== Life, history and identity ==
Aphrahat was born near the border of Roman Syria and Sasanian Iran around 280, during the rule of Shapur II.

The name Aphrahat is the Syriac version of the Persian name Frahāt, which is the modern Persian Farhād (فرهاد). He might have had Persian Jewish ancestors. The author, who was known as "the Persian sage", came from a Zoroastrian family and may have himself been a convert from Zoroastrianism, though this appears to be later speculation. An early tradition, found in the colophon to a manuscript dated to 510, instead ascribes to him the name Jacob, which may have been his baptismal name. Hence he was already confused with Jacob of Nisibis, by the time of Gennadius of Massilia (before 496), and the ancient Armenian version of nineteen of The Demonstrations has been published under this latter name. Thorough study of the Demonstrations makes identification with Jacob of Nisibis impossible. Aphrahat, being a Persian subject, cannot have lived at Nisibis, which became Persian only by Emperor Jovian's treaty of 363.

Furthermore, Jacob of Nisibis, who attended the First Council of Nicaea, died in 338, and from the internal evidence of Aphrahat's works he must have witnessed the beginning of the persecution of Christians in the early 340s by Shapur II. The persecutions arose out of political tensions between Rome and Persia, particularly the declaration of Constantine the Great that Rome should be a Christian empire. Shapur perhaps grew anxious that the largely Syriac and Armenian Christians within his Empire might secretly support Rome. There are elements in Aphrahat's writing that show great pastoral concern for his harried flock, caught in the midst of all this turmoil.

It is understood that his name was Aphrahat from comparatively late writers, such as Bar Bahlul (10th century), Elias of Nisibis (11th), Bar Hebraeus and Abdisho bar Berika. He appears to have been quite prominent in the Christian Church of the Persian Empire during the first half of the fourth century. George, bishop of the Arabs, writing in 714 to a friend who had sent him a series of questions about the "Persian sage", confesses ignorance of his name, home and rank, but gathers from his works that he was a monk, and of high esteem in the clergy. The fact that in 344 he was selected to draw up a circular letter from a council of bishops and other clergy to the churches of Ctesiphon and Seleucia and elsewhere (later to become Demonstration 14) is held by William Wright and others to prove that he was a bishop. According to a marginal note in a 14th-century manuscript (B.M. Orient. 1017), he was "bishop of Mar Mattai," a famous monastery near Mosul, but it is unlikely that this institution existed so early.

== About "The Demonstrations" ==
Aphrahat's works are collectively called the Demonstrations, from the identical first word in each of their titles (Syriac: ܬܚܘܝܬܐ, taḥwîṯâ). They are sometimes also known as "the homilies". There are twenty-three Demonstrations in all. Each work deals with a different item of faith or practice, and is a pastoral homily or exposition. According to Francis Crawford Burkitt, they are intended to form "a full and ordered exposition of the Christian faith." The standpoint is that of the Syriac-speaking church, before it was touched by the Arian controversy. Beginning with faith as the foundation, the writer proceeds to build up the structure of doctrine and duty.

The Demonstrations are works of prose, but frequently, Aphrahat employs a poetic rhythm and imagery to his writing. Each of the first twenty-two Demonstrations begins with each successive letter of the Syriac alphabet (of which there are twenty-two). The Demonstrations were not composed all at one time, but in three distinct periods. The first ten, composed in 337, concern themselves with Christian life and church order, and predate the persecutions. Demonstrations 11–22 were composed at the height of the persecution, in 344. Some of this group deal with matters as before, others focus on apocalyptic themes. However, four Demonstrations are concerned with Judaism. It appears that there was a movement within the Persian church by some either to become Jews or return to Judaism, or to incorporate Jewish elements into Christianity. Aphrahat makes his stand by explaining the meaning of the symbols of circumcision, Passover and Shabbat. The twenty-third Demonstration falls outside of the alphabetic system of the early works, and appears to be slightly later, perhaps near the end of Aphrahat's life. The twenty-third piece takes the symbolism of the grape, drawn from Isaiah chapter 65 and elsewhere, as its cue. It deals with the fulfillment of Messianic promise from Adam to Christ. Aphrahat never strays too far from the Bible in the Demonstrations: he is not given to philosophizing. All of his gospel quotations seem to be drawn from the Diatessaron, the gospel harmony that served the church at his time. Aphrahat's mode of biblical interpretation is strikingly similar to that of the Babylonian rabbinic academies of his day. His position within the church is indicated in Demonstration 14, in which Aphrahat appears to be writing a letter on behalf of his synod to the clergy of Persian capital, Ctesiphon-Seleucia on the Tigris.

In Demonstrations 5, Aphrahat dealt with eschatology. Concerning the beasts of Daniel 7, he identified the first beast as Babylon; the second, Media and Persia; the third, Alexander's Macedonian empire. The four heads of the leopard were the four successors of Alexander. The fourth beast appeared to include both the Macedonian successors of Alexander and the Roman emperors. Its horns he applied to the Seleucid kings down to Antiochus, whom he identified as the Little Horn.

A portion of ‘’Demonstration 11’’ is selected in the Liturgy of the Hours III, Lenten Season and Easter Season for Wednesday during the first week of Lent. The selection explains the theology of the ‘circumcision of the heart’ as the final covenant and inheritance of Christians.

== Translations ==
The Demonstrations were originally composed in the Syriac language, but were quickly translated into other languages. The Armenian version, published by Antonelli in 1756 and containing only 19 homilies, circulated mistakenly under the name Jacob of Nisibis. Important versions in Georgian and Ge'ez exist. A few of the Demonstrations were translated into Arabic, but wrongly attributed to Ephrem the Syrian.

== Order and subjects of The Demonstrations ==
1. Demonstration on faith — Demonstrations 1–10 were probably written 336–7
2. Demonstration on charity
3. Demonstration on fasting
4. Demonstration on prayer
5. Demonstration on wars
6. Demonstration on members of the covenant
7. Demonstration on penitents
8. Demonstration on resurrection
9. Demonstration on humility
10. Demonstration on pastors
11. Demonstration on circumcision — Demonstrations 11–22 were probably written 344
12. Demonstration on the Passover
13. Demonstration on the Sabbath
14. Demonstration on preaching
15. Demonstration on various foods
16. Demonstration on the call of the Gentiles
17. Demonstration on Jesus the Messiah
18. Demonstration on virginity
19. Demonstration on the dispersion of Israel
20. Demonstration on almsgiving
21. Demonstration on persecution
22. Demonstration on death and the last days
23. Demonstration concerning the grape — Demonstration 23 was probably written in the winter of 344–5
