= The Take-Charge Patient =

2012 book by Martine Ehrenclou

The Take-Charge Patient: How You Can Get the Best Medical Care
- First edition cover
- Author: Martine Ehrenclou
- Language: English
- Subject: Navigating healthcare
- Genre: Instructional
- Publisher: Lemon Grove Press
- Publication date: May 2012
- Publication place: United States
- Media type: Print (paperback)
- Pages: 320 pages
- ISBN: 978-0-98152-40-30
- OCLC: 1090427008
- Dewey Decimal: 610.696 E33
- LC Class: R727.45 .E33 2012

The Take-Charge Patient: How You Can Get the Best Medical Care is a book by the American author and patient advocate Martine Ehrenclou. Published in 2012 by Lemon Grove Press, the book provides guidance for patients to advocate for themselves in the healthcare system. Drawing from interviews with more than 175 patients and medical professionals, Ehrenclou offers advice to help readers with strengthening the doctor–patient relationship, preventing medical errors, and navigating health insurance plans.

While writing the book, Ehrenclou experienced chronic pain and spent 16 months meeting with 11 doctors attempting to find a diagnosis. She used the strategies she suggested in the book to find a doctor who diagnosed her with inguinal hernia and undergo surgery to treat her pain. The Take-Charge Patient received positive reviews, with reviewers saying it had an empowering approach and recommending it as a resource for patients attempting to navigate the healthcare system. The book won a 2012 Foreword Reviews Indies bronze award in the health category.

== Biographical background and publication ==
The author, Martine Ehrenclou, was born in 1959 or 1960 and is a patient advocate who lived in Los Angeles when the book was published. She graduated from Pepperdine University with a psychology master's degree and attended the University of California, Los Angeles, where she received a patient advocacy certificate. Ehrenclou's debut book was Critical Conditions: The Essential Hospital Guide to Get Your Loved One Out Alive, which was published in 2008. The book operates from the assumption that hospitals are dangerous places for patients. Ehrenclou accompanied her ill relatives during hospital visits and observed how the patients who championed their own needs received markedly different care.

She began experiencing chronic severe pelvic pain in January 2010, half a year into writing the book. Following the strategies she herself recommended in the book, Ehrenclou obtained medical care that produced sustained relief from pain. Before obtaining the correct diagnosis, she spent 16 months and met 11 doctors. During this time, she did several surgeries and procedures and received over 20 prescriptions. Shirin Towfigh, a doctor at Cedars-Sinai Medical Center, did an MRI on Ehrenclou and correctly diagnosed her as having an inguinal hernia. After undergoing hernia repair in mid-2011, Ehrenclou's pain was resolved. While researching The Take-Charge Patient, Ehrenclou spoke with upwards of 175 patients and doctors. The medical experts she consulted involved medical assistants, registered nurses, family physicians, surgeons, and clinical professors. Lemon Grove Press published the book in May 2012.

== Style ==
Publishers Weekly said that to help readers maneuver through the complex maze of the healthcare system, the author Martine Ehrenclou uses "a proactive tone" in offering an "empowering and refreshing" plan. According to the magazine, she draws on her interviews with doctors and patients, incorporating "well-placed quotes" from them. Ehrenclou finishes every chapter with a checklist written in the first-person. Publishers Weekly said the checklist, which is centered on the person receiving care, is "encouraging and practical".

Foreword Reviews reviewer Cindy Wolfe Boynton thought the book has a "comforting" tone and provides extensive details. She liked how the author offers clear practical advice that makes the toughest moments feel achievable, like telling a doctor who has treated the patient for a while that the patient wants to seek a second opinion. According to Boynton, the book is split into "short, straightforward chapters". She liked how Ehrenclou interspersed "valuable" firsthand experiences accompanied by helpful tips from the patients and healthcare practitioners she spoke with. Citing the appendix, Boynton said that in keeping with the book's overall style, it is "written simply, making complex medical information easy to understand".

== Content ==
The Take-Charge Patient advises healthcare recipients to act as patient advocates for themselves. Instead of being at the mercy of the medical system, they become "take-charge patients". The book addresses how patients can evaluate physicians to find the best fit for their needs as well as how to navigate the doctor–patient relationship and maximize the value of doctor's appointments. It explains how to distinguish among various procedures and healthcare professionals and gives advice about how to safeguard against medical errors. The book explains ways to organize medical records and obtain affordable or no-cost medical services and understanding patients' health insurance plans. It provides techniques for patients to study their affliction and identify potential diagnoses. It teaches patients about following preventive healthcare practices.

The book covers more granular topics like the optimal time to speak to a pharmacist. In its final chapter, it advises readers to fill out advance healthcare directives including a living will and a healthcare durable power of attorney. The documents allow patients to authorize someone to make health-choices for them if they become incapacitated and to specify the medical interventions to be done. The appendix defines health insurance jargon, healthcare workers, and medical tests. The book includes a "Patient Checklist" and itemized resources at the close of every chapter. Some chapters include additional questions to consider.

== Reception ==
In a positive review, Publishers Weekly said that the book is "full of cogent information" and an "exhaustive guide" but is "best as reference material" for readers who have the time and ability to manage their medical care. Foreword Reviews named the book a 2012 Indies winner with a bronze award in the health category. The magazine's reviewer Cindy Wolfe Boynton said that The Take-Charge Patient, like Ehrenclou's debut book Critical Conditions: The Essential Hospital Guide to Get Your Loved One Out Alive, reflects the deep expertise and credibility the author has drawn from living through such medical struggles. She recommended the book to readers navigating a challenging medical condition amid the ever-more complex healthcare landscape, calling it "a valuable tool and guide with sound advice that won't soon be outdated".

CBS News thought that the book "empowers patients to become pro-active, assertive and well-informed". Midwest Book Review called the book "a must" for patients who want to derive the maximum benefit from their healthcare. Leroy Hommerding of Island Sand Paper said the subtitle, "how you can get the best medical care", was "an apt description" of the book and concluded "would that every person could read this".
