= Church Fathers =

Early influential Christian theologians

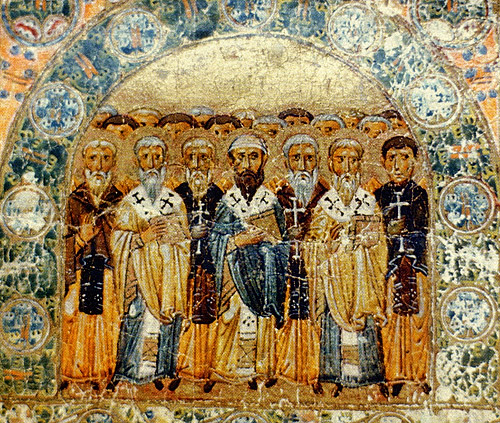
The Church Fathers, an 11th-century Kievan Rus' miniature from Svyatoslav's miscellany

The Church Fathers, Early Church Fathers, Christian Fathers, or Fathers of the Church were ancient and influential Christian theologians and writers who established the intellectual and doctrinal foundations of Christianity. The historical period in which they worked became known as the Patristic Era and spans approximately from the late 1st to mid-8th centuries, (Note: Byzantine Iconoclasm began in AD 726, John of Damascus died in AD 749; the last of the seven ecumenical councils took place in AD 787.) flourishing in particular during the 4th and 5th centuries, when Christianity was in the process of establishing itself as the state church of the Roman Empire.

For many denominations of Christianity, the writings of the Ante-Nicene Fathers, Nicene Fathers and Post-Nicene Fathers are included in Sacred Tradition. As such, in traditional dogmatic theology, authors considered Church Fathers are treated as authoritative for the establishment of doctrine. The academic field of patristics, the study of the Church Fathers, has extended the scope of the term, and there is no definitive list. Some, such as Origen and Tertullian, made major contributions to the development of later Christian theology, but certain elements of their teaching were later condemned.

== Apostolic Fathers ==
The Apostolic Fathers were Christian theologians who lived in the 1st and 2nd centuries AD, who are believed to have personally known some of the Twelve Apostles, or to have been significantly influenced by them. Their writings, though popular in Early Christianity, were ultimately not included in the canon of the New Testament once it reached its final form. Many of the writings derive from the same time period and geographical location as other works of early Christian literature that did come to be part of the New Testament, and some of the writings found among the Apostolic Fathers' seem to have been just as highly regarded as some of the writings that became the New Testament. The first three, Clement, Ignatius, and Polycarp, are considered the chief ones.

=== Clement of Rome ===
Clement of Rome (also known as Pope Clement I) was a late 1st-century bishop of Rome who, according to Tertullian, was ordained by Saint Peter. According to Irenaeus, Clement was the fourth bishop of Rome after Anacletus. Eusebius described him as the "co-laborer" of Paul and identified him with the Clement mentioned in Philippians 4:3.

The First Epistle of Clement (c. 96) is the earliest extant epistle from a Church Father. In the epistle, Clement calls on the Christians of Corinth to maintain harmony and order. Copied and widely read in the Early Church, First Clement had been considered by some as part of the New Testament canon, e.g., listed as canonical in Canon 85 of the Canons of the Apostles, among other early canons of the New Testament, showing that it had canonical rank in at least some regions of early Christendom. As late as the 14th century Ibn Khaldun mentions it as part of the New Testament.

=== Ignatius of Antioch ===
Ignatius of Antioch (also known as Theophorus) (c. 35 – c. 110) was the third bishop of Antioch, and was said to be a student of the Apostle John. En route to his martyrdom in Rome, Ignatius wrote a series of letters which have been preserved. Important topics addressed in these letters include ecclesiology, the sacraments, the role of bishops, and the incarnation of Christ. He is the second after Clement to mention Paul's epistles.

=== Polycarp of Smyrna ===
Polycarp of Smyrna (c. 69 – c. 155) was a Christian bishop of Smyrna (now İzmir in Turkey). It is recorded that he had been a disciple of "John". The options/possibilities for this John are John, the son of Zebedee, traditionally viewed as the author of the Gospel of John, or John the Presbyter. Traditional advocates follow Eusebius of Caesarea in insisting that the apostolic connection of Polycarp was with John the Evangelist and that he was the author of the Gospel of John, and thus the Apostle John.

Polycarp tried and failed to persuade Pope Anicetus to have the West celebrate Passover on the 14th of Nisan, as in the Eastern calendar. Around AD 155, the Smyrnans of his town demanded Polycarp's execution as a Christian, and he died a martyr. The story of his martyrdom describes how the fire built around him would not burn him, and that when he was stabbed to death, so much blood issued from his body that it quenched the flames around him.

=== Papias of Hierapolis ===
Very little is known of Papias apart from what can be inferred from his own writings. He is described as "an ancient man who was a hearer of John and a companion of Polycarp" by Polycarp's disciple Irenaeus (c. 180). Eusebius adds that Papias was Bishop of Hierapolis around the time of Ignatius. In this office, Papias was presumably succeeded by Abercius of Hierapolis. The name Papias was very common in the region, suggesting that he was probably a native of the area. The work of Papias is dated by most modern scholars to about AD 95–120.

Despite indications that the work of Papias was still extant in the Late Middle Ages, the full text is now lost; however, extracts appear in a number of other writings, some of which cite a book number.

== Greek Fathers ==
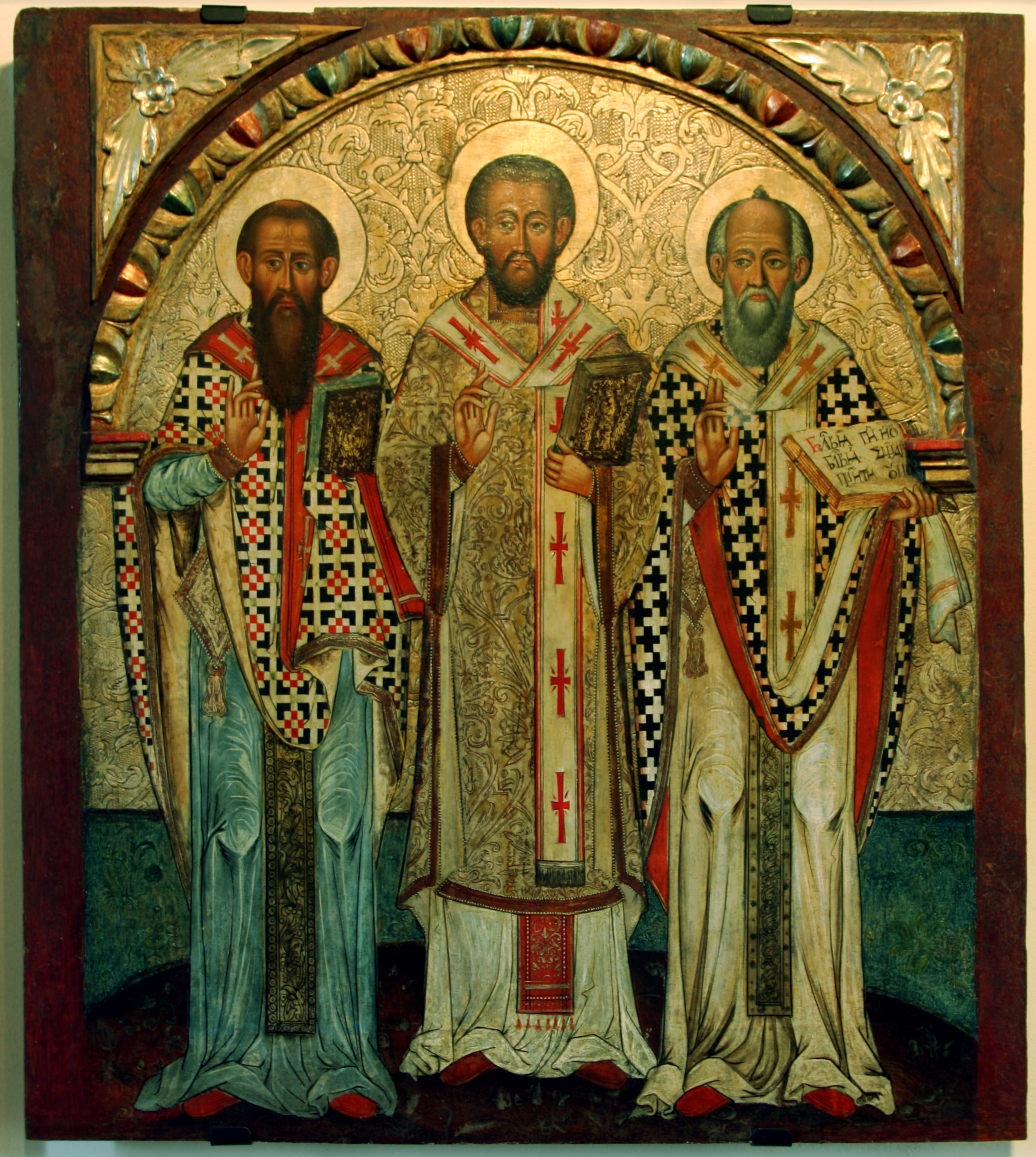
The Three Holy Hierarchs of the Eastern Church: Basil of Caesarea (left), John Chrysostom (center) and Gregory of Nazianzus (right)

Those who wrote in Greek are called the Greek (Church) Fathers. In addition to the Apostolic Fathers, famous Greek Fathers include: Justin Martyr, Irenaeus of Lyons, Clement of Alexandria, Origen of Alexandria, Athanasius of Alexandria, the Cappadocian Fathers (Basil of Caesarea, Gregory Nazianzus, Gregory of Nyssa), Peter of Sebaste, Diodorus of Tarsus, Theodore of Mopsuestia, John Chrysostom, Cyril of Alexandria, Maximus the Confessor, and John of Damascus.

In the Catholic Church tradition, Athanasius of Alexandria (c. 296 or 298 – 373), Basil of Caesarea (c. 330 – 379), Gregory of Nazianzus (329 – c. 390), and John Chrysostom (347–407) are four Greek Church Fathers who are called the "Great Church Fathers", and in the Eastern Orthodox Church, three of these (Basil of Caesarea, Gregory of Nazianzus and John Chrysostom) are honored as the "Three Holy Hierarchs".

=== Justin Martyr ===
Justin Martyr was an early Christian apologist, and is regarded as the foremost interpreter of the theory of the Logos in the 2nd century. He was martyred, alongside some of his students, and is considered a saint by the Catholic Church, Oriental Orthodox Churches, the Eastern Orthodox Church, and Anglicanism.

=== Irenaeus of Lyons ===
Irenaeus was bishop of Lugdunum in Gaul, which is now Lyon(s), France. His writings were formative in the early development of Christian theology, and he is recognized as a saint by both the Eastern Orthodox Church and the Catholic Church. He was a notable early Christian apologist. He was also a disciple of Polycarp.

In his best-known book, Against Heresies (c. 180), he enumerated heresies and attacked them. Irenaeus wrote that the only way for Christians to retain unity was to humbly accept one doctrinal authority—episcopal councils. Irenaeus proposed that the Gospels of Matthew, Mark, Luke and John all be accepted as canonical.

=== Clement of Alexandria ===
Clement of Alexandria (c. 150–215) was the first member of the church of Alexandria whose writings have survived, and was one of its most distinguished teachers. He saw wisdom in Greek philosophy and sought to harmonize it with Christian doctrine. Clement opposed Gnosticism, and yet used some of its terminology; for instance, he valued gnosis that with communion for all people could be held by common Christians. He developed a Christian Platonism and has been described by scholars as "the founder of what was to become the great tradition of Christian philosophical theology." Due to his teaching on salvation and divine judgement in passages such as Paedagogus 1.8 and Stromata 7.2, Clement is often regarded as one of the first Christian universalists. Like Origen, he arose from the Catechetical School of Alexandria and was well-versed in pagan and biblical literature.

=== Origen of Alexandria ===
Origen, or Origen Adamantius (c. 185 – c. 254) was a scholar and theologian. According to tradition, he was an Egyptian who taught in Alexandria, reviving the Catechetical School where Clement had taught. The patriarch of Alexandria at first supported Origen but later expelled him for being ordained without the patriarch's permission. He relocated to Caesarea Maritima and died there after being tortured during a persecution. He later became a controversial figure and some of his writings were condemned as heretical. Using his knowledge of Hebrew, he produced a corrected Septuagint. He wrote commentaries on all the books of the Bible. In Peri Archon (First Principles), he articulated a systematic philosophical exposition of Christian doctrine. He at times employed an allegorical hermeneutic in his interpretation of the Old Testament, and was partly influenced by Stoic, Neo-Pythagorean, and Platonist thought. Like Plotinus, he has been thought to believe that the soul passes through successive stages before incarnation as a human and after death, eventually reaching God. However, more recent scholarship has concluded that Origen actually denied the preexistence of disembodied souls, and simply taught the preexistence of individuals' logoi in the mind of God. Yet Origen did suggest, based on 1 Corinthians 15:22–28, that all creatures, possibly including even the fallen angels, will eventually be restored and reunited to God when evil is finally eradicated. For Origen, God was the First Principle, and Christ, the Logos through whom salvation is accomplished. Origen's various writings were interpreted by some to imply a hierarchical structure in the Trinity, the temporality of matter, "the fabulous preexistence of souls", and "the monstrous restoration which follows from it." These alleged "Origenist errors" were declared anathema by a council in 553, three centuries after Origen had died in the peace of the church.

=== Athanasius of Alexandria ===
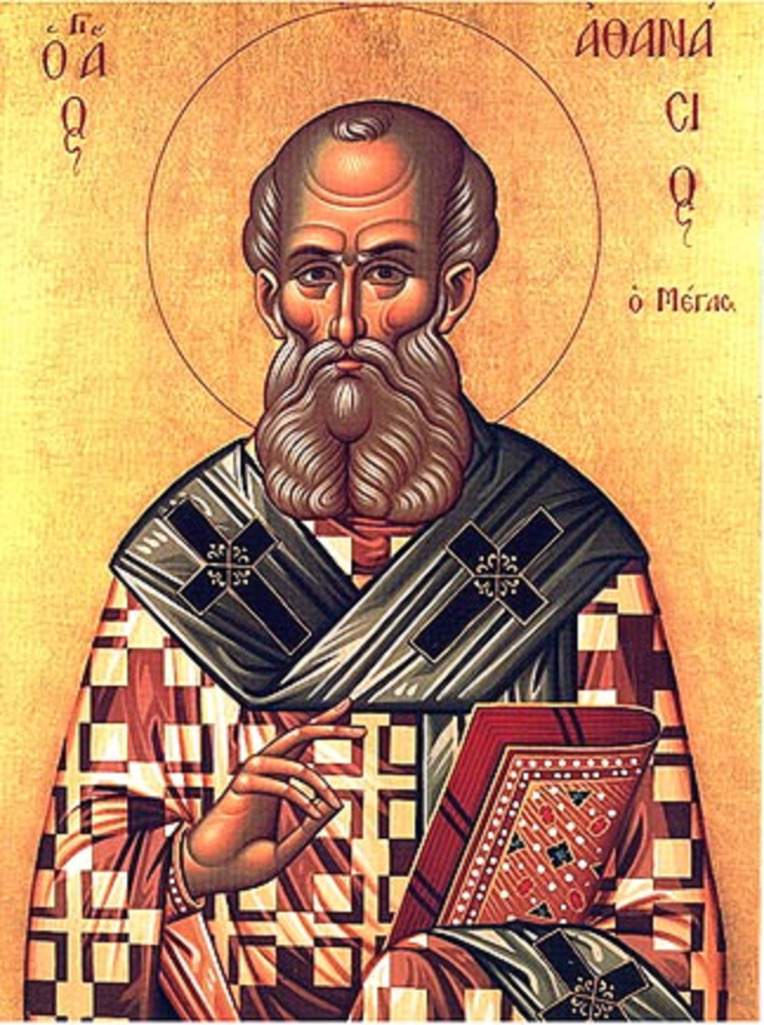
St. Athanasius, depicted with a gospel book, an iconographic symbol used mostly for priests and bishops as preachers of the gospel

Athanasius of Alexandria (c. 293 – 373) was a theologian, Pope of Alexandria, and a noted Egyptian leader of the 4th century. He is remembered for his role in the conflict with Arianism and for his affirmation of the Trinity. At the First Council of Nicaea (325), Athanasius argued against the Arian doctrine that Christ is of a distinct substance from the Father.

=== Cappadocian Fathers ===
The Cappadocian Fathers are Basil the Great (330–379), who was bishop of Caesarea; Basil's younger brother Gregory of Nyssa (c. 332 – 395), who was bishop of Nyssa; and a close friend, Gregory of Nazianzus (329–389), who became Patriarch of Constantinople. The Cappadocians promoted early Christian theology and are highly respected in both Western and Eastern churches as saints. They were a 4th-century monastic family, led by Macrina the Younger (324–379) to provide a central place for her brothers to study and meditate, and also to provide a peaceful shelter for their mother. Abbess Macrina fostered the education and development of her three brothers Basil the Great, Gregory of Nyssa and Peter of Sebaste (c. 340 – 391) who became bishop of Sebaste.

These scholars set out to demonstrate that Christians could hold their own in conversations with learned Greek-speaking intellectuals. They argued that Christian faith, while it was against many of the ideas of Plato and Aristotle (and other Greek philosophers), was an almost scientific and distinctive movement with the healing of the soul of man and his union with God at its center. They made major contributions to the definition of the Trinity finalized at the First Council of Constantinople in 381 and the final version of the Nicene Creed.

Subsequent to the First Council of Nicea, Arianism did not simply disappear. The semi-Arians taught that the Son is of like substance with the Father (homoiousios), as against the outright Arians who taught that the Son was unlike the Father (heterousian). So the Son was held to be like the Father but not of the same essence as the Father. The Cappadocians worked to bring these semi-Arians back to the Orthodox cause. In their writings they made extensive use of the formula "three substances (hypostases) in one essence (homoousia)", and thus explicitly acknowledged a distinction between the Father and the Son (a distinction that Nicea had been accused of blurring) but at the same time insisting on their essential unity.

=== John Chrysostom ===
John Chrysostom (c. 347 – c. 407), archbishop of Constantinople, is known for his eloquence in preaching and public speaking; his denunciation of abuse of authority by both ecclesiastical and political leaders, recorded sermons and writings making him the most prolific of the eastern fathers, and his ascetic sensibilities. After his death (or according to some sources, during his life) he was given the Greek epithet chrysostomos, meaning "golden mouthed", rendered in English as Chrysostom.

Chrysostom is known within Christianity chiefly as a preacher and theologian, particularly in the Eastern Orthodox Church; he is the patron saint of orators in the Catholic Church. Chrysostom is also noted for eight of his sermons that played a considerable part in the history of Christian antisemitism, diatribes against Judaizers composed while a presbyter in Antioch, which were extensively exploited and misused by the Nazis in their ideological campaign against the Jews. Patristic scholars such as Robert L Wilken point out that applying modern understandings of antisemitism back to Chrysostom is anachronistic due to his use of the Psogos. The Psogos, along with the encomium, were both rhetorical techniques used in the ancient world in a polemical context. With the encomium "one passes over a man's faults in order to praise him, and in a psogos, one passed over his virtues to defame him. Such principles are explicit in the handbooks of the rhetors, but an interesting passage from the church historian Socrates, writing in the mid-fifth century, shows that the rules for invective were simply taken for granted by men and women of the late Roman world."

Chrysostom's sermons along with Basil the Great's have greatly influenced the Christian Church's understanding of economic and distributive justice for the poor, being cited extensively by the Catechism of the Catholic Church as well as Pope Francis in his own sermons critiquing modern-day forms of capitalism.

=== Theodore of Mopsuestia ===
Theodore of Mopsuestia (c. 350 – 428) was a Christian theologian, and Bishop of Mopsuestia (as Theodore II) from 392 to 428 AD. He is also known as Theodore of Antioch, from the place of his birth and presbyterate. He is the best known representative of the middle Antioch School of hermeneutics. He is known to be a prolific writer and exegete with strong emphases on the literal, historical and rational interpretation of Christian scriptures. Throughout his lifetime, he was hailed as one of the outstanding, prolific biblical theologians and staunch defender of Christ's humanity. More than a century after his death, he was condemned in person in the Chalcedonian Church at the Second Council of Constantinople. However he continues to be recognised as a Greek Doctor in the Church of the East, which honours him with the title 'Theodore the Interpreter'.

In 394, he attended a synod at Constantinople on a question which concerned the see of Bostra in the patriarchate of Antioch. While there, Theodore had the opportunity to preach before the emperor Theodosius I, who was then starting for his last journey to the West. The sermon made a deep impression, and Theodosius, who had sat at the feet of Ambrose and Gregory Nazianzus, declared that he had never met with such a teacher (John of Antioch, ap. Facund. ii.2). Theodosius II inherited his grandfather's respect for Theodore, and often wrote to him. Another glimpse of Theodore's episcopal life is supplied by a letter of Chrysostom to him from Cucusus (AD 404–407) (Chrys. Ep. 212). The exiled patriarch "can never forget the love of Theodore, so genuine and warm, so sincere and guileless, a love maintained from early years, and manifested but now." Chrysostom (Ep. 204) thanks him profoundly for frequent though ineffectual efforts to obtain his release, and praises their friendship in such glowing terms that Theodore's enemies at the fifth Ecumenical Council made unsuccessful efforts to deny the identity of Chrysostom's correspondent with the bishop of Mopsuestia.

=== Cyril of Alexandria ===
Cyril of Alexandria (c. 378 – 444) was the Bishop of Alexandria when the city was at its height of influence and power within the Roman Empire. Cyril wrote extensively and was a leading protagonist in the Christological controversies of the late 4th and early 5th centuries. He was a central figure in the First Council of Ephesus in 431, which led to the deposition of Nestorius as Archbishop of Constantinople. Cyril's reputation within the Christian world has resulted in his titles "Pillar of Faith" and "Seal of all the Fathers".

=== Maximus the Confessor ===
Maximus the Confessor (also known as Maximus the Theologian and Maximus of Constantinople) (c. 580 – 662) was a Christian monk, theologian, and scholar. In his early life, he was a court secretary to the Byzantine Emperor Heraclius; however, he gave up this life in the political sphere to enter into the monastic life.

After moving to Carthage, Maximus studied several Neo-Platonist writers and became a prominent author. When one of his friends began espousing the Christological position known as Monothelitism, Maximus was drawn into the controversy, in which he supported the Chalcedonian position that Jesus had both a human and a divine will. Maximus is venerated in both Eastern Christianity and Western Christianity. His Christological positions eventually resulted in his torture and exile, soon after which he died; however, his theology was vindicated by the Third Council of Constantinople, and he was venerated as a saint soon after his death. His feast day is celebrated twice during the year: on 21 January and on 13 August. His title of Confessor means that he suffered for the faith, but not to the point of death, and thus is distinguished from a martyr. His Life of the Virgin is thought to be the earliest complete biography of Mary, the mother of Jesus.

=== John of Damascus ===
John of Damascus (c. 676 – 749) was a Syrian Christian monk, priest, hymnographer and apologist. Born and raised in Damascus, he died at his monastery, Mar Saba, near Jerusalem.

A polymath whose fields of interest and contribution included law, theology, philosophy, and music, he was given the by-name of Chrysorrhoas (Χρυσορρόας, literally "streaming with gold", i.e. "the golden speaker"). He wrote numerous works expounding the Christian faith, and composed hymns which are still used both liturgically in Eastern Christian practice throughout the world as well as in western Lutheranism at Easter. He was particularly known for his defense of icons.

The Catholic Church regards him as a Doctor of the Church, often referred to as the Doctor of the Assumption because of his writings on the Assumption of Mary.

== Latin Fathers ==
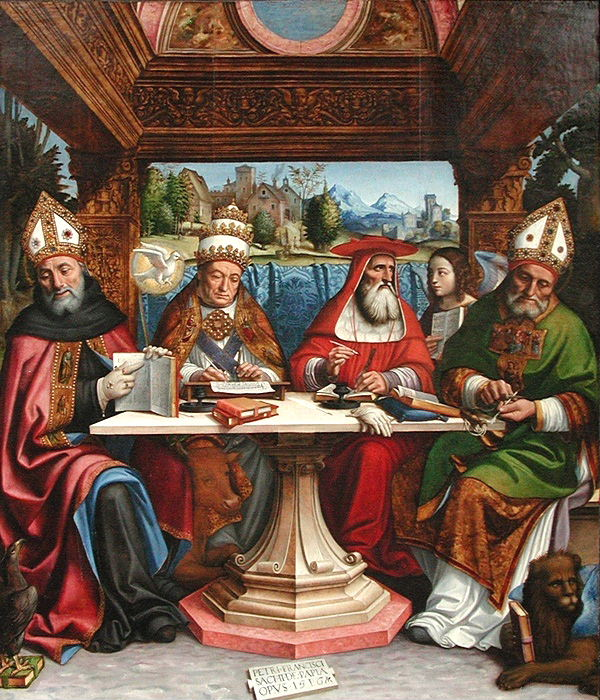
The four Great Latin Fathers. From the left: Augustine of Hippo, Pope Gregory I, Jerome, and Ambrose.

Those fathers who wrote in Latin are called the Latin (Church) Fathers. In the Catholic Church tradition, Ambrose (AD 340–397), Jerome (347–420), Augustine of Hippo (354–430), and Pope Gregory I (540–604) are four Latin Church Fathers who are called the "Great Church Fathers".

=== Tertullian ===
Quintus Septimius Florens Tertullianus (c. 155 – c. 222), who was converted to Christianity before 197, was a prolific writer of apologetic, theological, controversial and ascetic works. He was born in Carthage, the son of a Roman centurion.

Tertullian denounced Christian doctrines he considered heretical, such as allowing widows to remarry and permitting Christians to flee from persecution, but later in life adopted Montanism, regarded as heretical by the mainstream Church, which prevented his canonization. He wrote three books in Greek and was the first great writer of Latin Christianity, thus sometimes known as the "Father of the Latin Church". He was evidently a lawyer in Rome. He is said to have introduced the Latin term trinitas with regard to the Divine (Trinity) to the Christian vocabulary (but Theophilus of Antioch had already written of "the Trinity, of God, and His Word, and His Wisdom", which is similar but not identical to the Trinitarian wording), and also probably the formula "three Persons, one Substance" as the Latin "tres Personae, una Substantia" (itself from the Koine Greek "τρεῖς ὑποστάσεις, ὁμοούσιος; treís hypostasis, Homoousios"), and also the terms vetus testamentum (Old Testament) and novum testamentum (New Testament).

In his Apologeticus, he was the first Latin author who qualified Christianity as the vera religio, and systematically relegated the classical Roman imperial religion and other accepted cults to the position of mere "superstitions".

He used the early church's symbol for fish—the Greek word for "fish" being ΙΧΘΥΣ, which is an acronym for Ἰησοῦς Χριστός, Θεοῦ Υἱός, Σωτήρ (Jesus Christ, God's Son, Saviour)—to explain the meaning of baptism, since fish are born in water. He wrote that human beings are like little fish.

=== Cyprian of Carthage ===
Cyprian (c. 200 – 258) was bishop of Carthage and an important early Christian writer. He was born in North Africa, probably at the beginning of the 3rd century, perhaps at Carthage, where he received an excellent classical (pagan) education. After converting to Christianity, he became a bishop and eventually died a martyr at Carthage. He emphasized the necessity of the unity of Christians with their bishops, and also the authority of the Roman See, which he claimed was the source of "priestly unity"'.

=== Hilary of Poitiers ===
Hilary of Poitiers (c. 300 – c. 368) was Bishop of Poitiers and is a Doctor of the Church. He was sometimes referred to as the "Hammer of the Arians" (Latin: Malleus Arianorum) and the "Athanasius of the West". His name comes from the Graeco-Latin word for happy or cheerful. His optional memorial in the General Roman Calendar is 13 January. In the past, when this date was occupied by the Octave Day of the Epiphany, his feast day was moved to 14 January.

=== Ambrose of Milan ===
Ambrose (Note: Known in Latin and Low Franconian as Ambrosius, in Italian as Ambrogio and in Lombard as Ambroeus.) was an archbishop of Milan who became one of the most influential ecclesiastical figures of the 4th century. He was a governor before becoming bishop. He is counted as one of the four original doctors of the Church. He offered a new perspective on the theory of atonement.

=== Pope Damasus I ===
Pope Damasus I (305–384) was active in defending the Catholic Church against the threat of schisms. In two Roman synods (368 and 369) he condemned the heresies of Apollinarianism and Macedonianism, and sent legates (papal representatives) to the First Council of Constantinople that was convoked in 381 to address these heresies. He also wrote in defense of the Roman See's authority, and inaugurated use of Latin in the Mass, instead of the Koine Greek that was still being used throughout the Church in the west in the liturgy.

=== Jerome of Stridonium ===
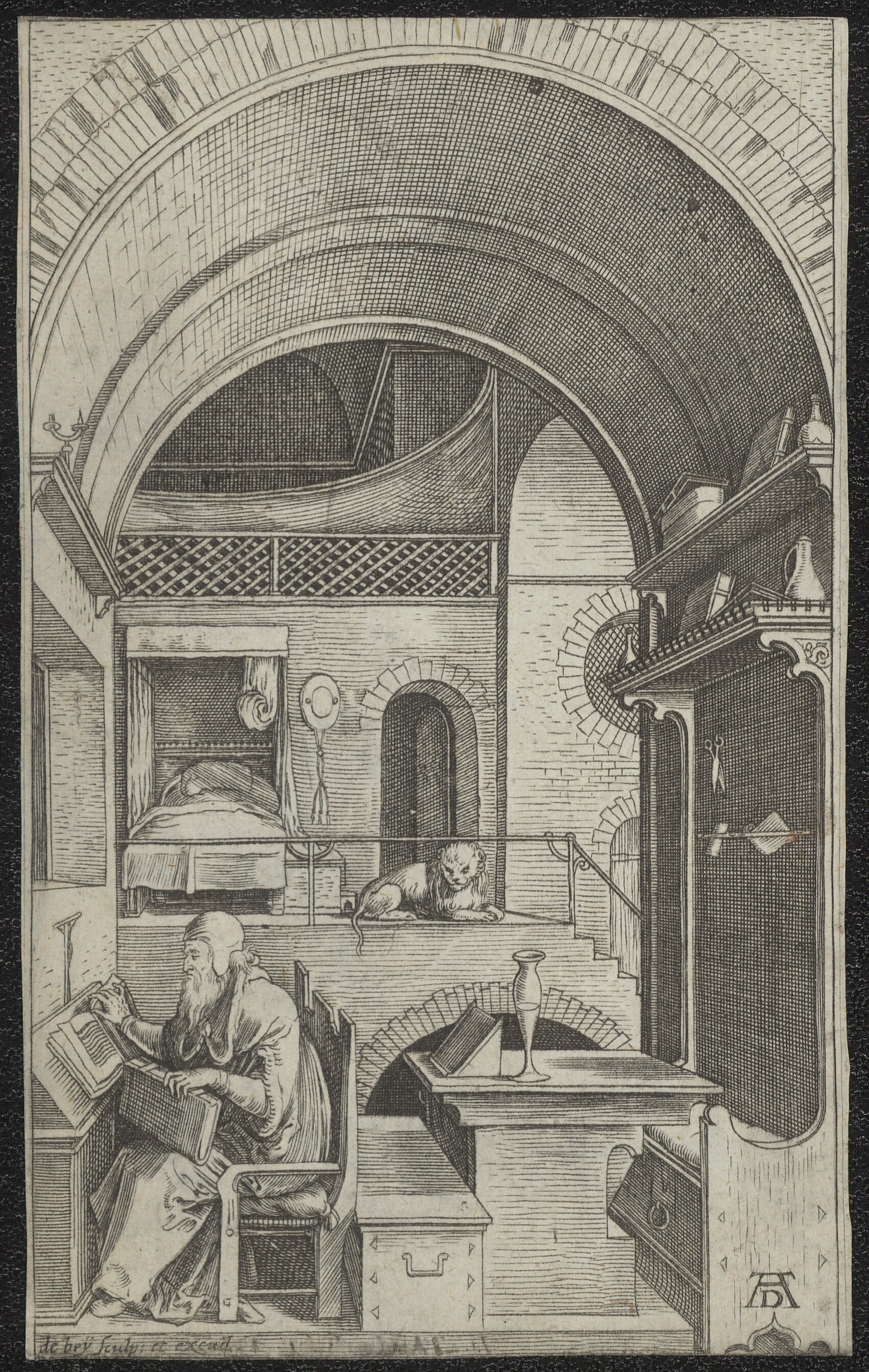
Print of Jerome in his study. Preserved in the Ghent University Library.

Jerome (c. 347 – 420) is best known as the translator of the Bible from Greek and Hebrew into Latin. He also was a Christian apologist. Jerome's edition of the Bible, the Vulgate, is still an important text of Catholicism. He is recognised by the Catholic Church as a Doctor of the Church.

=== Augustine of Hippo ===
Augustine (354–430), Bishop of Hippo, was a philosopher and theologian. Augustine, a Latin Father and Doctor of the Church, is one of the most important figures in the development of Western Christianity. In his early life, Augustine read widely in Greco-Roman rhetoric and philosophy, including the works of Platonists such as Plotinus. He framed the concepts of original sin and just war as they are understood in the West. When Rome fell and the faith of many Christians was shaken, Augustine wrote The City of God, in which he defended Christianity from pagan critics and developed the concept of the Church as a spiritual City of God, distinct from the material City of Man. Augustine's work defined the start of the medieval worldview, an outlook that would later be firmly established by Pope Gregory the Great.

Augustine was born in present-day Algeria to a Christian mother, Monica of Hippo. He was educated in North Africa and resisted his mother's pleas to become Christian. He took a concubine and became a Manichean. He later converted to Christianity, became a bishop, and opposed heresies, such as Pelagianism. His many works—including The Confessions, which is often called the first Western autobiography—have been read continuously since his lifetime. The Catholic religious order, the Order of Saint Augustine, adopted his name and way of life. Augustine is also the patron saint of many institutions and a number have been named after him.

=== Pope Leo the Great ===
Pope Leo I (c. 400 – 461) was pope from 29 September 440 until his death. He was active in defending the Latin Church against the threat of schism associated with Monophysitism, Miaphysitism and Dyophysitism, most remembered theologically for issuing the Tome of Leo, a document which was a major foundation to the debates of the Council of Chalcedon, the fourth ecumenical council.

=== Pope Gregory the Great ===
Gregory I the Great (c. 540 – 604) was pope from 3 September 590 until his death. He is also known as Gregorius Dialogus (Gregory the Dialogist) in Eastern Orthodoxy because of the Dialogues he wrote. He was the first of the popes from a monastic background. Gregory is a Doctor of the Church and one of the four great Latin Fathers of the Church (the others being Ambrose, Augustine, and Jerome). Of all popes, Gregory I had the most influence on the early medieval church.

=== Isidore of Seville ===
Isidore of Seville (c. 560 – 636) was Archbishop of Seville for more than three decades and is considered, as the historian Montalembert put it in an oft-quoted phrase, "le dernier savant du monde ancien" ("the last scholar of the ancient world"). Indeed, all the later medieval history-writing of Hispania (the Iberian Peninsula, comprising modern Spain and Portugal) was based on his histories.

At a time of disintegration of classical culture and aristocratic violence and illiteracy, he was involved in the conversion of the royal Visigothic Arians to Nicene Christianity, both assisting his brother Leander of Seville and continuing after his brother's death. He was influential in the inner circle of Sisebut, Visigothic king of Hispania. Like Leander, he played a prominent role in the Councils of Toledo and Seville. The Visigothic legislation which resulted from these councils is regarded by modern historians as exercising an important influence on the beginnings of representative government.

== Syriac Fathers ==
A few Church Fathers wrote in Syriac; many of their works were also widely translated into Latin and Greek. These include Aphrahat, Jacob of Nisibis, Ephrem, Narsai, Jacob of Serug, Henana, Aba, Abraham of Izla, Babai, Hormizd and Isaac of Nineveh.

=== Aphrahat ===
Aphrahat (c. 270 – c. 345 was a Syriac-Christian author of the 3rd century from the Adiabene region of Northern Mesopotamia, which was within the Persian Empire, who composed a series of twenty-three expositions or homilies on points of Christian doctrine and practice. He was born in Persia around 270, but all his known works, the Demonstrations, come from later on in his life. He was an ascetic and celibate, and was almost definitely a son of the covenant (an early Syriac form of communal monasticism). He may have been a bishop, and later Syriac tradition places him at the head of Mar Matti monastery near Mosul, in what is now northern Iraq. He was a near contemporary to the slightly younger Ephrem the Syrian, but the latter lived within the sphere of the Roman Empire. Called the Persian Sage (Syriac: ܚܟܝܡܐ ܦܪܣܝܐ, ḥakkîmâ p̄ārsāyā), Aphrahat witnesses to the concerns of the early church beyond the eastern boundaries of the Roman Empire.

=== Ephrem the Syrian ===
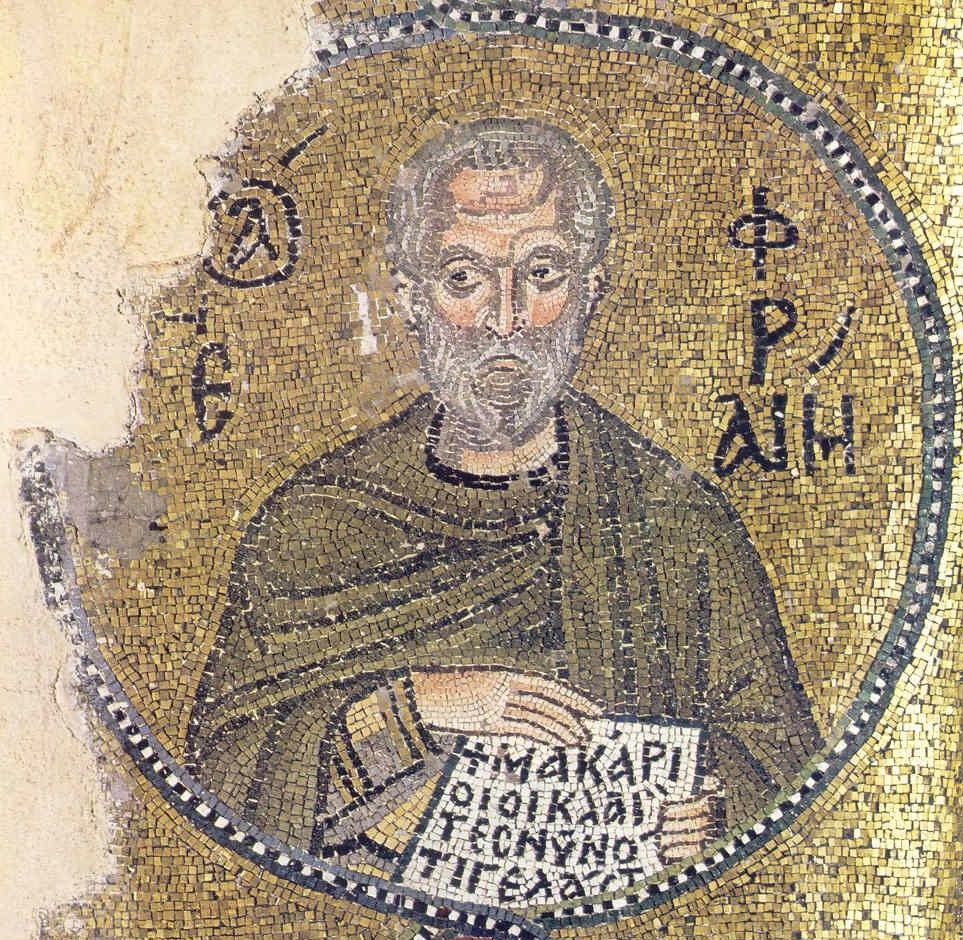
Ephrem the Syrian (11th century mosaic in Nea Moni).

Ephrem the Syrian (c. 306 – 373) was a Syriac deacon and a prolific Syriac-language hymnographer and theologian of the 4th century from the region of Syria. His works are hailed by Christians throughout the world, and many denominations venerate him as a saint. He has been declared a Doctor of the Church in the Catholic Church. He is especially beloved in the Syriac Orthodox Church and in the Church of the East.

Ephrem wrote a wide variety of hymns, poems, and sermons in verse, as well as prose biblical exegesis. These were works of practical theology for the edification of the church in troubled times. So popular were his works, that, for centuries after his death, Christian authors wrote hundreds of pseudepigraphal works in his name. He has been called the most significant of all of the fathers of the Syriac-speaking church tradition.

=== Isaac of Antioch ===
Isaac of Antioch (451–452), one of the stars of Syriac literature, is the reputed author of a large number of metrical homilies (The fullest list, by Gustav Bickell, contains 191 which are extant in MSS), many of which are distinguished by an originality and acumen rare among Syriac writers.

=== Isaac of Nineveh ===
Isaac of Nineveh was a 7th-century Syriac bishop and theologian best remembered for his written work. He is also regarded as a saint in the Church of the East, the Catholic Church, the Eastern Orthodox Church and among the Oriental Orthodox Churches, making him the last saint chronologically to be recognised by every apostolic Church. His feast day falls on January 28 and in the Syriac Orthodox calendar on March 14. Isaac is remembered for his spiritual homilies on the inner life, which have a human breadth and theological depth that transcends the Nestorian Christianity of the Church to which he belonged. They survive in Syriac manuscripts and in Greek and Arabic translations.

== Desert Fathers ==
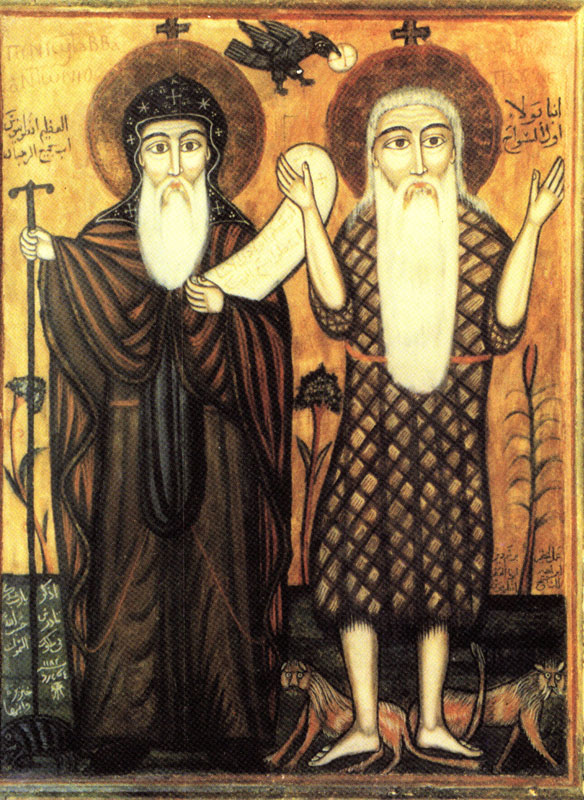
Coptic icon depicting Anthony the Great (left) and Paul of Thebes (right)

The Desert Fathers were early monastics living in the Egyptian desert. Although they did not write as much as other Church Fathers, their influence was also great, and they are credited with forming the basis for the practice of monasticism. Among them are Paul of Thebes, Anthony the Great and Pachomius. Many of their sayings are collected in the Apophthegmata Patrum ("Sayings of the Desert Fathers").

== Modern positions ==
=== Catholicism ===
In the Catholic Church, the patristic era is believed to have passed. On account of their proximity to ancient sources and particular way of doing theology, John of Damascus and Bernard of Clairvaux are among those considered to be the last of the Church Fathers. However, the Church does grant the similar title of Doctor of the Church to notable post-patristic saints who have made significant contributions to Catholic theology or doctrine.

=== Eastern Orthodoxy ===
The Eastern Orthodox Church does not consider the age of Church Fathers to be over and includes later influential writers up to the present day. The Orthodox view is that men do not have to agree on every detail, much less be infallible, to be considered Church Fathers. Rather, Orthodox doctrine is determined by the consensus of the Holy Fathers: those points on which they do agree. This consensus guides the church in questions of dogma, the correct interpretation of scripture, and to distinguish the authentic sacred tradition of the Church from false teachings.

=== Protestantism ===
The original Lutheran Augsburg Confession of 1530 and the later Formula of Concord of 1576–1584, both begin with the mention of the doctrine professed by the Fathers of the First Council of Nicaea.

Though much Protestant theology is based on sola scriptura (the principle that the Bible itself is the ultimate authority in doctrinal matters), the first Protestant reformers, like the Catholic and Orthodox churches, used the theological interpretations of scripture set forth by the early Church Fathers.

John Calvin's French Confession of Faith of 1559 states, "And we confess that which has been established by the ancient councils, and we detest all sects and heresies which were rejected by the holy doctors, such as St. Hilary, St. Athanasius, St. Ambrose and St. Cyril."

The Scots Confession of 1560 deals with general councils in its 20th chapter. The Thirty-nine Articles of the Church of England, both the original of 1562–1571 and the American version of 1801, explicitly accept the Nicene Creed in Article VII. Even when a particular Protestant confessional formula does not mention the Nicene Council or its creed, its doctrine is nonetheless always asserted, as, for example, in the Presbyterian Westminster Confession of 1647. Many Protestant seminaries provide courses on patristics as part of their curriculum, and many historic Protestant churches emphasize the importance of tradition and of the fathers in scriptural interpretation. Such an emphasis is even more pronounced in certain streams of Protestant thought, such as Paleo-Orthodoxy.

== Patristics ==
The study of the Church Fathers is known as patristics.

Works of fathers in early Christianity, prior to Nicene Christianity, were translated into English in a 19th-century collection Ante-Nicene Fathers. Those of the First Council of Nicaea and continuing through the Second Council of Nicea (787) are collected in Nicene and Post-Nicene Fathers.

== See also ==
- Christian apologetics
- Confessor of the Faith
- Great Church
- Historiography of early Christianity
- List of Church Fathers
- List of Christian women of the patristic age
- List of Eastern Orthodox saint titles
- Patron Saints of Europe
- Sacred tradition
- Clavis Patrum Graecorum
