= Farad (disambiguation) =

The farad (symbol: F) is an SI derived unit of electrical capacitance.

Farad or FARAD may also refer to:

- Farád, a village in Hungary
- Farad, California, a former settlement in United States
- Farad Azima, British industrialist, technology entrepreneur and philanthropist
- FARAD, the Faraday Accelerator with Radio-frequency Assisted Discharge

== See also ==
- Phraates (disambiguation)
- Farhad, given name
- Faraday (unit), former unit of electrical charge
