= Sirin (disambiguation) =

Sirin is a Russian mythological bird. Sirin may also refer to:

- Sirin, Iran, a village in Kermanshah Province, Iran
- Sirin, Baysan, a Palestinian village depopulated in 1948
- Sirin bint Shamun, one of Muhammad's slaves
- Şirin, a Turkish name
- Ephrem the Syrian, an ancient Syrian saint known as Sirin in Russia
- V. Sirin, the pen name of Vladimir Nabokov during his exile in Berlin
- Vaniel Sirin (born 1989), Haitian football player
