= Shireen =

Shireen may refer to:

== People ==
- Shireen Abed, Palestinian pediatrician and neonatal specialist
- Shireen Ahmed, Canadian writer, public speaker, and sports activist
- Shireen Akbar (1944–1997), Indian-born British educator and an artist
- Shireen Abu Akleh (1971–2022), Palestinian journalist
- Shireen Akhter (born 1956), Bangladeshi academic
- Shireen Anwar, Pakistani chef and writer
- Shireen Bailey (born 1959), English middle-distance runner
- Shireen Benjamin (born 1988), British Sierra Leonean model
- Shireen Chambers (born 1962), British forester
- Shireen Crutchfield (born 1970), American actress
- Shireen Dalvi, Indian journalist
- Shireen Avis Fisher, American judge
- Shireen Ghorbani (born 1981), American politician
- Shireen Hassim, South African political scientist, historian, and scholar
- Shireen Hunter (born 1945), Iranian political scientist
- Shireen Huq, Bangladeshi activist
- Shireen Jawad (born 1971), Bangladeshi British singer
- Shireen Kassam (born 1975), British haematologist
- Shireen Arshad Khan, Pakistani politician
- Shireen Lateef (died 2016), Fijian women's rights activist
- Shireen Mazari (born 1949), Pakistani political scientist
- Shireen Mirza, Indian actress
- Shireen Mitchell, American entrepreneur, author, technology analyst, and diversity strategist
- Shireen Ritchie, Baroness Ritchie of Brompton (1945–2012), British politician
- Shireen Sapiro (born 1991), South African Paralympic swimmer
- Shireen Sungkar (born 1992), Indonesian actress

== Other uses ==
- Khosrow and Shirin, a Persian tragic romance by Nizami Ganjavi (1141−1209)
- Shireen Baratheon, a minor character in the Game of Thrones book and television series
- Tareq wa Shireen, a Jordanian animated television series

== See also ==
- Shirin (disambiguation)
