= Shirin Rouhanirad =

- شیرین روحانی راد
- Born: 1967; Pahlavi Iran
- Died: 18 March 2020 (aged 52–53); Tajrish, Tehran, Iran
- Resting place: Martyrs Section, "Deh Emam" Cemetery, Pakdasht
- Education: Shahid Beheshti University of Medical Sciences
- Occupation: Physician

Shirin Rouhanirad (Persian: شیرین روحانی راد; 1967 – 18 March 2020) was an Iranian physician. She worked as a general practitioner at Shahda Pakdasht Hospital in Iran and died during her medical service after contracting COVID-19. From the onset of the COVID-19 pandemic in Iran, she treated patients in the emergency department of the hospital. She also collaborated with the Sharifabad Health Center, and the Shahid Ashrafi Esfahani Clinic in Pakdasht County.

== Death ==
After the virus spread from Qom to other cities, she worked in the emergency department of Shahda Pakdasht Hospital diagnosing infected patients. After working long hours for 25 days due to the shortage of medical personnel in Pakdasht's emergency section, she contracted the disease, but continued to visit patients even while receiving an IV drip. Eventually, due to the severity of her illness, she admitted herself to the hospital and was hospitalized for ten days at Shahda Pakdasht Hospital. Her condition worsened and she was transferred to Masih Daneshvari Hospital in the Tajrish neighborhood of Tehran, Iran, where she died on 18 March 2020. She was buried in the Martyrs Section of "Deh Emam" Cemetery in Pakdasht.

== See also ==
- COVID-19 pandemic in Qom
