= Rubicon Group Holding =

Global entertainment production company

- Type: Private
- Industry: Animation; E-learning; Gaming; Entertainment
- Predecessor: Jordan Training Technology Group (1994–2004)
- Founded: 1994; 32 years ago as Jordan Training Technology Group; 2004; 22 years ago as Rubicon Group Holding
- Founder: Randa Ayoubi
- Headquarters: Amman, Jordan, Amman, Jordan
- Area served: Worldwide
- Key people: Randa Ayoubi, CEO; Ali Kolaghassi, Chairman, Ghassan Ayoubi, Executive Director
- Website: www.rubiconholding.com

Rubicon Group Holding is a Jordanian global entertainment production company, headquartered in Amman, Jordan, with additional offices in Los Angeles, California, United States, Manila, Philippines, and Dubai, United Arab Emirates.

RGH has a team of designing, directing and producing content including: Feature Films, Television, Games, Applications, Webisode Content, Themed Entertainment Design and Development, IP Acquisition and Licensing and Merchandising.

== Lines of business ==
Rubicon Group Holding operates in four distinct lines of business, all within the digital media industry. These are:

- RGH Entertainment

Production and co-production of animated series and full feature movies.

- RGH Themed Entertainment

Design, production and implementation of a wide variety of interactive and highly immerse themed- entertainment experiences to tourist destinations, real estate development projects, hotels, retail stores. shopping malls, museums and restaurants.

- RGH Education

Design, production and implementation of new digital content including K1 to 12, professional development, virtual vocational training, game-based educational content products and integrated training simulations for various industries.

- RGH Games

Design and development of ambitious array of games by award winning, multi-talented game designers for both serious(applied) and casual games.

== Strategic partnerships ==
In 2010, Rubicon signed a number of strategic partnerships deals with global and regional leaders in the media and communication industries such as Turner Broadcasting and Etisalat. Headlining the new partnership with Turner is an agreement to broadcast Rubicon's own Ben & Izzy and Tareq wa Shireen animated series on Cartoon Network Arabic in the Middle East and North Africa.

The strategic partnership with Etisalat aims at providing the company with edutainment content designed in both English and Arabic aimed at the younger generations.

Rubicon also manages the international licensing and merchandising of its intellectual properties, such as Tareq wa Shireen, the first 2D animated series in created exclusively in Arabic; Ben & Izzy a 3D animated action adventure, Pink Panther and Pals. a 2D animated which is co-produced with MGM Studios airing on Cartoon Network.

== Notable intellectual properties ==
- Postman Pat: The Movie
- Ben & Izzy
- Pink Panther and Pals
- Tareq wa Shireen
- The Life and Adventures of Santa Claus
- Monsters in My Pocket
- Grover Safari Road Safety
