= Ben & Izzy =

- The series' original logo
- Also known as: بن وعصام
- Genre: Animation, Adventure, Children's historical edutainment
- Written by: Jymn Magon
- Directed by: Glenn Chaika
- Voices of: English version: Annie Mumolo; Kath Soucie; Lucy Liu; Clancy Brown; Mark Hamill; Brian Cummings
- Country of origin: Jordan
- Original language: English (and later officially dubbed into Arabic)
- No. of seasons: 1
- No. of episodes: 13

Production
- Executive producers: David Pritchard; Randa Ayoubi
- Production company: Rubicon Group Holding

Original release
- Network: Cartoon Network Arabic; Majid Kids TV

Ben & Izzy (Arabic: بِنْ وعصام) is a Jordanian animated children's television series. It was produced by Jordan's rising educational and CGI animation company Rubicon. This series follows the adventures and developing friendship of two preadolescent boys known as Ben and Izzy (Issam), who are from the United States and Jordan respectively, as well as a desert genie known as Yasmine, who takes the form of a young girl closely resembling the age of the boys.

Despite the fact the series was produced in Jordan, it was primarily released in English for international purposes before its official Arabic dub in 2008. The series was created primarily to entertain, but it was also created as an educative experience about certain aspects of Arab history, and how it affected Western culture, which is also the forming of the bond between the Western Ben and the Eastern/Arab Izzy. This in turn represents a comprehensible and possible union of Western and Eastern/Arab cultures, in spite of the current prejudice views of each culture in the other. There are currently 13 episodes created, although 26 were originally planned.

== Story ==
The three of them soon realize that with their respective talents combined, they become the dream team, preserving history and saving the world!

== Episode guide ==
=== Season 1 ===
Ben, Izzy and Yasmine get to know each other and explore many countries in the Middle East, looking for precious artifacts that were lost in time. Thanks to her genie powers, Yasmine whisks the boys to different times and lands to beat Clutchford Wells, whose sole interest is to sell the artifacts with no regard to how it would alter world history.

(2010)

#	Name
1	Innocents Abroad and Trouble Afoot
2	Treasure Obscura
3	In harmony's way
4	A flight of fancy, a fancy of flight
5	Sailing, Sailing
6	Stars in their Eyes
7	I Robot You Loser
8	The Mane Event
9	Rug of War
10	Check, mate
11	Easy as ABC
12	What's up Doctor?
13	The Pearl of Life

== Characters ==
Designed by Yazan Khalifeh:

- Ben: an 11-year-old American sports fan
- Izzy: an 11-year-old Arab Jordanian boy who loves technology
- Yasmine: a young genie with amazing powers
- Prof. Jake Martin: Ben's grandfather and feisty archeologist
- Prof. Omar Aziz: Izzy's spry grandfather, a scholar and a wiry man
- Clutchford Wells: a greedy millionaire seeking nothing but material gain
- Roxanne: Wells's mute assistant

== Voices ==
=== English ===
- Lucy Liu – Yasmine
- Clancy Brown - Wells

=== Arabic ===
- Hisham Hamadeh – Wells
- Rania Fahed
