= Shirin Farhad =

Shirin Farhad or Shirin Farhaad may refer to:

- A version of the classic Persian story of Khosrow and Shirin
- Shirin Farhad (1931 film), an Indian musical film directed by J.J. Madan, the second Indian film with sound
- Shirin Farhad (1956 film), an Indian romantic drama film directed and produced by Aspi Irani
- Shirin Farhad, a 2025 Pakistani series

== See also ==
- Shirin (disambiguation)
- Farad (disambiguation)
- Shirin and Farhad (film), a 1934 Iranian romance film
- Shirin Farhad Ki Toh Nikal Padi, a 2012 Indian romantic comedy film
