= Phraates =

- Gender: Male
- Language: Ancient Greek, Parthian

Origin
- Origin: Iranian
- Meaning: Elation, happiness

Other names
- Variant forms: Phraataces, Frahat, Frahad, Farhad
- Derived: Frahāt

"'Phraates'" is the Greek transliteration of Parthian Farhad. Five kings of Parthian Empire were named Phraates (Ancient Greek: Φραάτης, Parthian: Frahāt, Persian: Farhad (فرهاد)

- Phraates I c. 176–171 BC
- Phraates II c. 132–127 BC
- Phraates III c. 69–57 BC
- Phraates IV c. 38–2 BC
- Phraates V (Phraataces) c. 2 BC–AD 4

== See also ==
- Farad (disambiguation)
- Farhad, the modern Persian form of the name
