= Sherine Obare =

American chemist

- Education: West Virginia State University; University of South Carolina
- Scientific career
- Workplaces: Western Michigan University; University of North Carolina at Greensboro North Carolina Agricultural and Technical State University
- Thesis: Optical sensing strategies for the development of novel chemical probes (2002)

Sherine O. Obare is the dean of the Joint School of Nanoscience and Nanoengineering at the University of North Carolina at Greensboro and North Carolina Agricultural and Technical State University. She works on nanomaterials for sensing and drug delivery.

== Early life and education ==
Obare spent her childhood in Germany, where she attended a British high school. She studied chemistry, mathematics and physics. She majored in engineering, but decided to focus on chemistry because of her college roommate. She eventually began her bachelor's degree in chemistry at West Virginia State University and graduated in 1998. She applied for a job at the United States Environmental Protection Agency, but was convinced by her professor to she would enjoy graduate school. She joined the University of South Carolina for her doctoral studies and earned her PhD in 2002. She worked under the supervision of Catherine J. Murphy. With Murphy, Obare developed a new approach to fabricate polystyrene and silica coated gold nanorods as templates for hollow nanotubes. Hollow nanotubes are useful for drug delivery, cell and enzyme transplantation, removal of contaminated waste and gene therapy. To create the gold nanorods, Obare used nanoparticles as a seed in a growth solution that contained cetyltrimethylammonium bromide, sodium hydroxide and ascorbic acid at a controlled pH (3.5). She demonstrated that gold nanoparticles functionalised with 1,10-phenanthroline could be used to sense lithium ions in solution. The ligands of 1,10-phenanthroline bind to the lithium ions, forming a complex that causes the nanoparticles to aggregate. Obare explored several ligands, including dipyridophenazine (DPPZ) which changes colour when it binds to lithium ions. The nanorods can form liquid crystalline phases. Obare was a Camille and Henry Dreyfus Foundation fellow at Johns Hopkins University working under the supervision of Gerald Meyer.

== Career ==
In 2004 Obare joined Western Michigan University as an assistant professor and promoted to tenure in 2009. She also works on nanomaterials for drug delivery and chemical sensing. She investigated fluorescent chemosensors to monitor for organophosphorous. Organophosphorous can inhibit cholinesterase and can have severe environmental and health impacts. Obare was awarded an National Science Foundation CAREER Award in 2006. This allowed her to develop multi-electron transfer catalysts. Obare is interested in multi-electron transfer. She has investigated electron transfer from heme-functionalised titanium dioxide to organohalide pollutants. She demonstrated that organohalides degrade via multi-electron pathways. She has explored new techniques to synthesise and characterise monodisperse nanoparticles. The nanoparticles can be used to detect bacteria in waterborne diseases.

Obare was appointed associate dean at Western Michigan University in 2015. She was responsible for research, education, diversity and global engagement across the university. She believes that early authentic research is essential for underrepresented groups to gain rational view of the world. From 2017 Obare served as Associate Vice President for Research at Western Michigan University.

Obare is an associate editor for the Journal of Nanomaterials. She moved to the University of North Carolina at Greensboro as dean of the Joint School of Nanoscience and Nanoengineering. In October 2023, Obare was named the Vice Chancellor for Research and Engagement at University of North Carolina at Greensboro. Obare chairs the American Chemical Society Award for Incorporation of Sustainability into the Curriculum.

== Awards and honours ==
- 2006 National Science Foundation CAREER Award
- 2007 American Chemical Society Dreyfus Lectureship Award
- 2009 Haenicke Institute for Global Education International Faculty Development Award
- 2009 International Union of Pure and Applied Chemistry Young Observer Award
- 2009 National Science Foundation Materials Grant
- 2010 American Competitiveness and Innovation (ACI) Fellowship
- 2010 NOBCChE Lloyd N. Ferguson Young Scientist Award
- 2010 Science Spectrum Magazine Trailblazer Award
- 2012 National Organization for the Professional Advancement of Black Chemists and Chemical Engineers President's Award

== Books ==
- 2018 The Power and Promise of Early Research
