= Farhad, Nishapur =

Farhad فرهاد
- Village
- Location within Iran
- Coordinates: 36°06′48″N 58°44′29″E
- Country: Iran
- Province: Razavi Khorasan
- County: Nishapur
- Bakhsh: Central
- Rural District: Rivand

Population (1954)
  - Total: 132
- Time zone: UTC+3:30 (IRST)
  - Summer (DST): UTC+4:30 (IRDT)

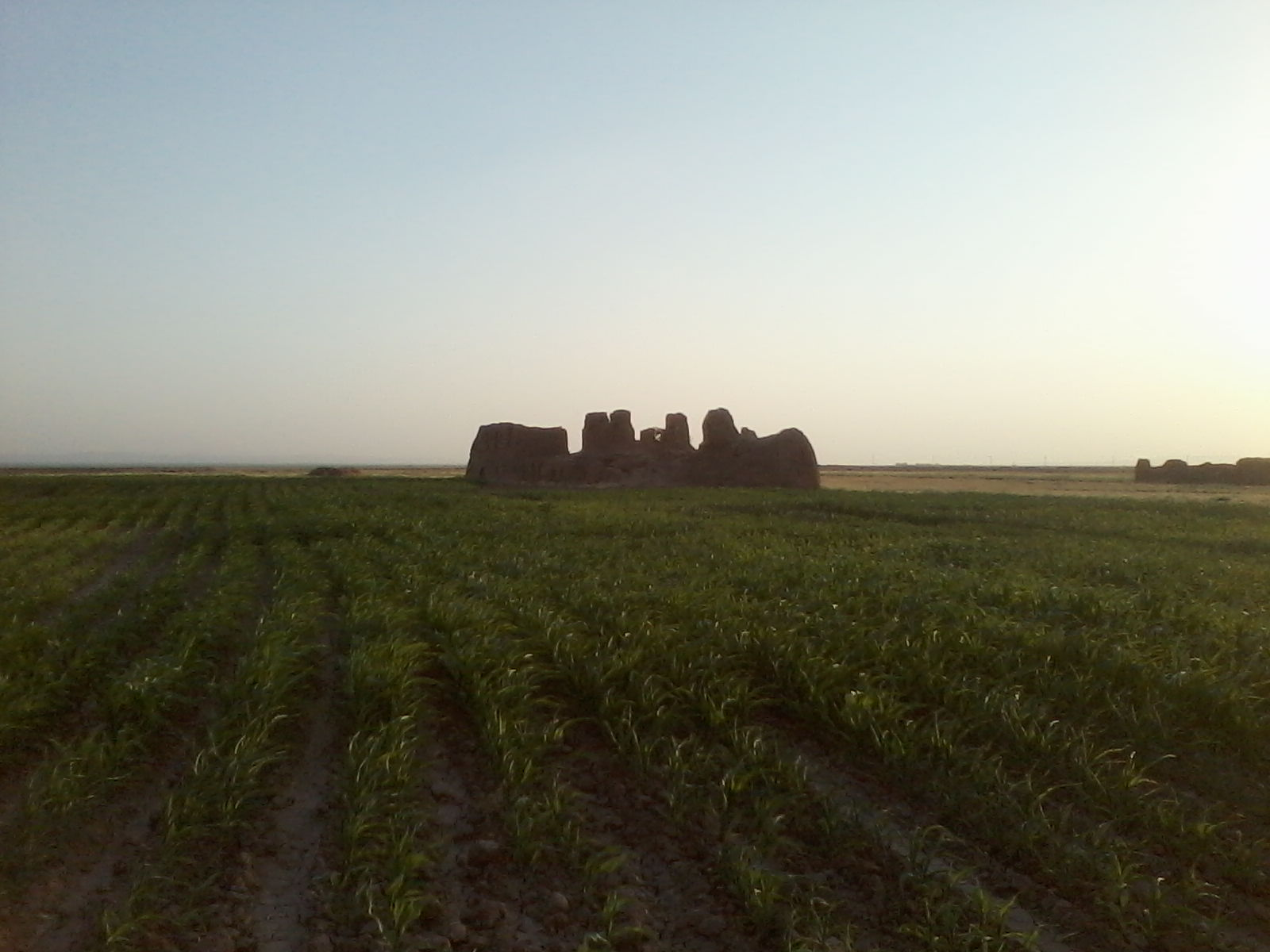
View of the Farhad Village-Nishapur

Farhad (Persian: فرهاد, as Farhād) is a village in Rivand Rural District, in the Central District of Nishapur County, Razavi Khorasan Province, Iran. At the 1954 census, its population was 132, but now the population is empty.
