= Farad Azima =

British-Iranian industrialist (1943–2020)

- Born: 1943; Tehran, Iran
- Died: August 29, 2020 (aged 76–77)
- Citizenship: British
- Education: Leeds University
- Years active: 1976–2020

Farad Azima (Persian: فرهاد عظیما) was an industrialist, technology entrepreneur and philanthropist. He had numerous international patents in diverse areas of engineering.

== Early life and business ==
Azima undertook postgraduate studies at Leeds University until 1972, where was an active alumnus. In 1976, he founded the British audio manufacturer, Mission Electronics, in Cambridge. This was followed by other well-known startups, notably Cyrus Electronics and later, NXT plc together with Sir Gordon Brunton. The Company licensed patented technologies to multinationals in consumer electronics. Cyrus Electronics manufactures specialist equipment with a serious following among the audiophile community.

In 1997, together with Daily Mail newspapers, Verity Group Plc., of which Farad was the CEO, founded Eastern Counties Radio. During this period, he also co-produced a series of Baroque Music CDs with the Gramophone Magazine. Azima has also served on the Industrial Advisory Board of Churchill College, Cambridge University from 2001 to 2005.

Later in life, Farad devoted time to philanthropy and, together with his two children; Artemis and Cyrus has founded a UK registered charity, The Azima Foundation of which Lady Henrietta Spencer-Churchill is the President. The Foundation supports good causes in medicine and culture. The Foundation is also a supporter of Robert F Kennedy Center for Justice & Human Rights.

== Other interests ==
Azima's wide cultural interests included the Menuhin International Violin Competition, of which he was a director. Azima also was a member of the 2010 Art & Illustration Fundraising Committee of the Natural History Museum. In 2010, he was appointed an honorary member of Asia House in London. He was a Fellow of The Royal Institution of Great Britain.

Azima's later interests included the bio-medical and the clean energy sectors. In 2004, he was invited to restructure Clean Diesel Technologies, Inc. of Stamford, Connecticut.

Azima founded the NetScientific Group, where he was Chief executive until January 2015, with Sir Richard Sykes as the chairman. The Group supports industry-driven research projects at leading universities in Britain and the United States.

Farad Azima parted company with NetScientific in January 2015, and established FrontierBio in March 2015. FrontierBio pursues closely targeted, strategic investments in the life sciences sector. It is engaged in a number of advanced scientific research programmes in diagnostics and genomics with major European research institutions. Additionally, its recently formed sister company, CetroMed Limited, is investing in drug development joint ventures in Europe.

== Personal life ==
In 1984, Azima married Jennifer Margaret, daughter of Royal Artillery Lieutenant-Colonel Denys Hope Molesworth, MC, of Rory Cottage, Forest Row, Sussex, descended from the politician and writer Robert Molesworth, 1st Viscount Molesworth. They had a son, Cyrus (born 1985) and daughter, Artemis (born 1986). He also had a son, Edward ("Teddy"). Azima died on August 29, 2020.
