= Shirin, Fars =

Shirin شيرين
- Village
- Location within Iran
- Coordinates: 30°11′47″N 51°39′26″E
- Country: Iran
- Province: Fars
- County: Mamasani
- Bakhsh: Central
- Rural District: Javid-e Mahuri

Population (2006)
  - Total: 108
- Time zone: UTC+3:30 (IRST)
  - Summer (DST): UTC+4:30 (IRDT)

Shirin (Persian: شيرين, also Romanized as Shīrīn) is a village in Javid-e Mahuri Rural District, in the Central District of Mamasani County, Fars province, Iran. At the 2006 census, its population was 108, in 26 families.
