= Shirin, Sistan and Baluchestan =

Shirin شيرين
- Village
- Location within Iran
- Coordinates: 31°06′09″N 61°42′15″E
- Country: Iran
- Province: Sistan and Baluchestan
- County: Hirmand
- Bakhsh: Central
- Rural District: Margan

Population (2006)
  - Total: 90
- Time zone: UTC+3:30 (IRST)
  - Summer (DST): UTC+4:30 (IRDT)

Shirin (Persian: شيرين, also Romanized as Shīrīn) is a village in Margan Rural District, in the Central District of Hirmand County, Sistan and Baluchestan Province, Iran. At the 2006 census, its population was 90, in 16 families.
