= Ferhat Kıskanç =

Turkish footballer

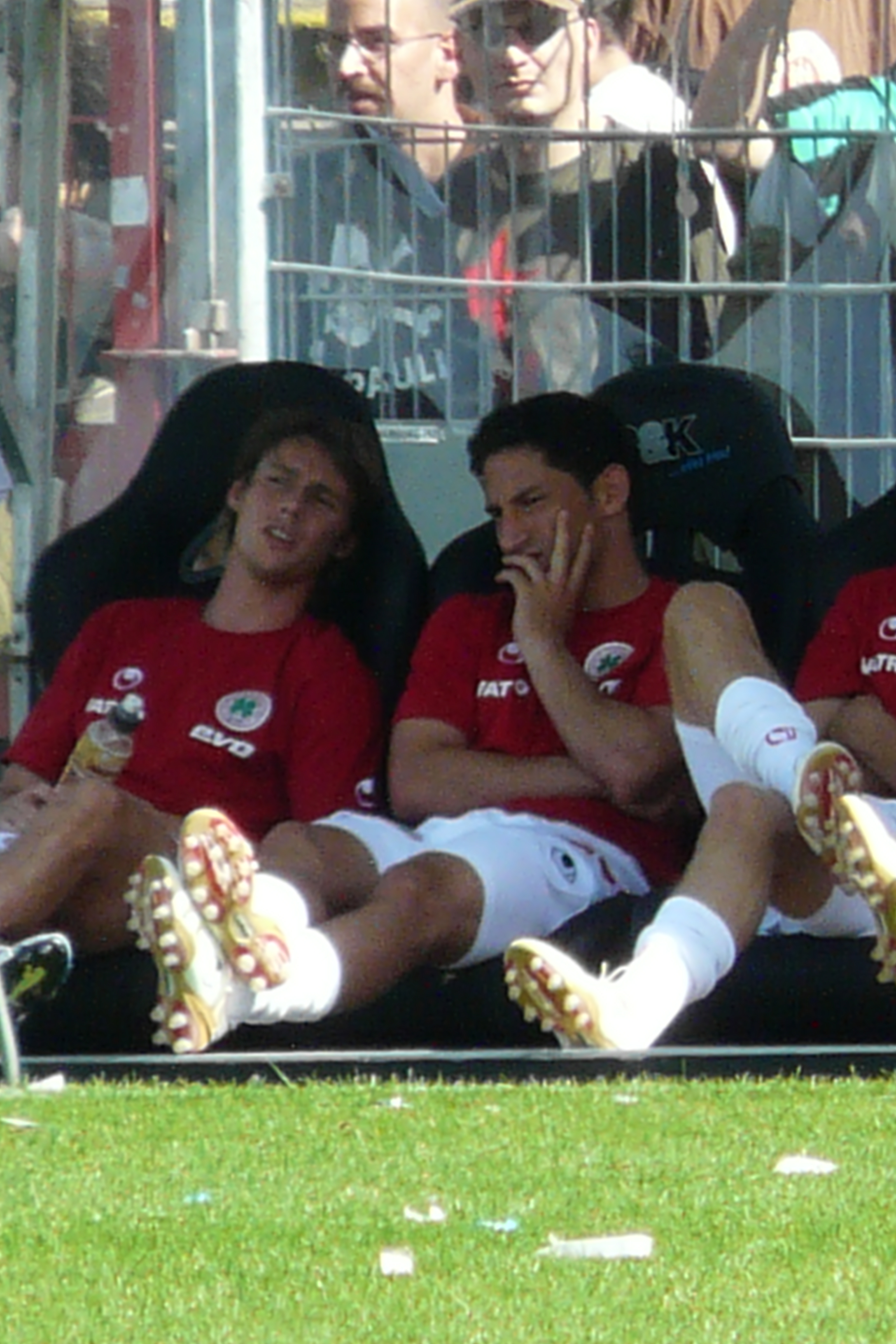
- image of Ferhat Kıskanç and others, on bench during a match

Personal information
- Full name: Ferhat Kıskanç
- Date of birth: 1 August 1982 (age 44)
- Place of birth: Cologne, West Germany
- Height: 1.75 m (5 ft 9 in)
- Position: Midfielder

Youth career
- 2002–2005: 1. FC Köln

Senior career*
Years	Team	Apps	(Gls)
2002–2005	1. FC Köln II	90	(3)
2002–2005	1. FC Köln	1	(0)
2005–2008	Rot-Weiss Essen	58	(3)
2008–2009	Rot-Weiß Oberhausen	8	(1)
2010–2011	Bergisch Gladbach 09	4	(0)
2015–2016	DSK Köln	8	(1)
Total		169	(8)
- * Club domestic league appearances and goals

Ferhat Kıskanç (born 1 August 1982 in Cologne, West Germany) is a Turkish retired footballer.
