= Farhad Ahmed Kanchan =

Bangladeshi politician

Member of Bangladesh Parliament
- In office 18 February 1979 – 12 February 1982

Personal details
- Political party: Bangladesh Nationalist Party

Farhad Ahmed Kanchan (Bengali: ফরহাদ আহম্মেদ কাঞ্চন) is a Bangladesh Nationalist Party politician and a former member of parliament for Mymensingh-22.

== Career ==
Kanchan was elected to parliament from Mymensingh-22 as a Bangladesh Nationalist Party candidate in 1979.
