= Shirin Gerami =

Shirin Gerami (Persian: شیرین گرامی; born 1988 or 1989) is Iran's first female triathlete competing in a world championship. On 15 September 2013, Gerami raced the triathlon championship in London while garbed in full Islamic dress. She has designed a range of sportswear to inspire other Iranian women to participate in sports.

== Personal life ==
Gerami was born in Iran, and lived in England for 11 years, with time spent in the U.S.A. and the Middle East. She studied for A-levels at Lancing College and then graduated with a degree in politics, philosophy and economics from Durham University.

== Recognition ==
In 2016 Gerami was chosen as one of the BBC 100 Women.

== Competition ==
- Triathlon World Champions, London, U.K., 15 September 2013.
- Ironman World Championships, Kona, Hawaii, U.S.A., 9 October 2016
