= Ferhat Güven =

Norwegian politician (born 1983)

Ferhat Güven (born 22 August 1983) is a Norwegian politician and a member of the Labour Party.

He served as a deputy representative to the Parliament of Norway from Sør-Trøndelag during the 2013–2017 term. He was elected to the Trondheim city council in 2011, and was born in Turkey.
