= Shireen Anwar =

Pakistani chef

Shireen Anwar is a Pakistani chef and writer who is known for her work on regional recipes of Pakistan. She has been a host of Masala Mornings since 2016.

== Career ==
Anwar started her career in 1976. She was educated at the Western food Institute New York. Formerly a housewife, she became a chef in 1990.

Anwar also started her cooking show Masala Mornings on Masala TV, for which she gained fame. Anwar has 27 years of cooking experience and has published two cookbooks in her career.

== Books ==
- Manpasand Masala Morning
- The World On Your Table
