= Shirin Melikova =

Shirin Melikova - Director of the Azerbaijan Carpet Museum Chairman of ICOM Azerbaijan National Committee, PhD in Art Studies

== Life ==
Shirin Yashar gizi Malikova was born in Baku November 4, 1978

== Education ==
In 1995-1999 she graduated from the Azerbaijan State University of Culture and Arts, Faculty of Art. In 1999–2001, he received a master's degree in Fine Arts History and Theory in the Azerbaijan State Academy of Fine Arts.

== Career ==
Shirin Malikova has worked as a teacher at the Azerbaijan University of Culture and Art and at the Azerbaijan State Academy of Fine Arts. In 2009, she worked as a master of art and project manager at the Maiden Tower, an art expert at the Heydar Aliyev Foundation.He also organized exhibitions, festivals and other cultural events at the Heydar Aliyev Center and abroad. He is the author of 10 books devoted to the Azerbaijani artists and about 40 scientific articles. According to the decree of the Minister of Culture and Tourism Abulfaz Garayev of March 2, 2016 he was appointed director of the Azerbaijan Carpet Museum
