= Tareq wa Shireen =

- Also known as: طارق و شيرين
- Genre: Animation, Educational entertainment, Children's educational edutainment
- Country of origin: Jordan
- Original language: Arabic
- No. of seasons: 1
- No. of episodes: 105

Production
- Production company: Rubicon Group Holding

Tareq wa Shireen (Arabic: طارق و شيرين) is one of the first 2D animated series produced exclusively in Arabic with implications towards promoting Arabic heritage, history, culture and music. Intended for pre-school and junior children, the series provides an early development tool to educating youngsters in an entertaining fashion. The series is currently only available as a DVD purchase.

== Plot ==
The series is organized into thirteen themes covering a range of educational topics from learning the Arabic language to health and exercise, each theme is further divided into five mini episodes covering each theme's different topics, and each of these mini episodes concludes with an easy-to-learn song that summarizes the information in the episode.

(2010)

DVD Set	Theme
1	The Alphabet
2	Counting & Numbers
3	Animals
4	Colors & Shapes
5	Body
6	Time & The Seasons
7	Myself
8	Emotions & Feelings
9	Food & Nutrition
10	Health & Exercise
11	Environment
12	Community
13	Safety

== Characters ==
- Tareq
- Shireen
- Haidar
- Wessam
- Hussam
- Haifa
