= Ferhat Korkmaz =

Swedish-born Turkish footballer

Personal information
- Full name: Ferhat Korkmaz
- Date of birth: 14 September 1981 (age 45)
- Place of birth: Nacka, Stockholm, Sweden
- Height: 1.86 m (6 ft 1 in)
- Position: Defender

Team information
- Current team: Väsby United
- Number: 18

Youth career
- Vasalunds IF
- AIK
- Hammarby IF

Senior career*
Years	Team	Apps	(Gls)
2002–2006	Valsta Syrianska IK		
2007–2008	Syrianska FC	23	(3)
2009	Vasalunds IF	7	(0)
2010–2011	IF Brommapojkarna	22	(2)
2012	Athletic FC	0	(0)
2012–	Väsby United	16	(0)

International career
2002	Turkey U21	2	(0)
- * Club domestic league appearances and goals as of 5 December 2012

Ferhat Korkmaz (born 14 September 1981) is a Swedish-born Turkish footballer who plays for Väsby United as a defender.
