= Sherin Zada =

Pakistani journalist

Sherin Zada (Urdu/Pashto: شیرین زادہ) is a Pakistani journalist working for Hum News. He was previously associated with the Express News based in Swat Valley, and had also worked with The Express Tribune, an English newspaper. He is known for his work during Taliban period over control of Swat Valley Pakistan. As a professional journalist, he covered or wrote highest number of reports and stories in the valley. He is president of Swat Press club (2023, 2024).

== World record ==
He is the first journalist with world record of skydiving (10,000 ft in the air) in Swat Valley Pakistan. The Sky Tandem Skydiving jump event was organized in Swat by Pakistan Army in Swat Valley Pakistan.

He is the first journalist with PTC during this skydiving with broadcasting on the Express News Pakistan. He was not properly trained for this skydiving and only got 04 hours briefing from Mr Peter (UK trainer).

== Abroad coverage for TV ==
When the first Pakistani female Malala Yousafzai from Pakistan was receiving the Nobel Peace Prize Sherin Zada got the opportunity to have the exclusive interview with Malala Yousafzai from Oslo, Norway.

== Negotiator ==
Negotiate the matter of release of the 32 Policemen captured by the Taliban, the negotiation were made with the Spokesman of the Swat Taliban and after 7 hours tough negotiation in 02 days. Even bend down for the sake of lives of the 32 Policemen and as outcome the 32 Policemen were safely released and were taken to their families in different part of the Country. This act was appreciated by the Policemen Department, Pakistan's Army, Local People, Civil Society and the national and international journalists.

== Visits / tours ==
He visited recently the US and Europe more than a dozen countries of the world during 2015–2016, in the US he visited many states and wrote about the Pakistanis working in the US, he also wrote about the American people.

He is also attached with Associated Press, he is one of the Notables in Swat. His work in videos can be seen at the link Sherin Zada remained on various position in Swat Press Club including general secretary (twice) and president Swat Union of Journalists.

== Family ==
His sons including Muhammad Abdullah Sherin (a journalist running an online news web-portal), Abdur Rahman (computer expert and graduate) and Shah Fahad (student/intermediate). He got four daughters including Ambareen Sherin, Ayesha Sherin, Javeria Sherin and Madheeha Sherin, he loves the little one the most (Madheeha Sherin). His family include another journalist Sheraz Khan.

== Personal life ==
During early days of his childhood he was founder cricketer and remained best batter and spin bowler at Super Star Cricket team in Swat valley.

During schooling he was fond of driving and was good driver at the age 13. He was also fond of fishing and photography in addition. He often spent days in summer at Swat River and was a traveler.

He also owns the online news web-portal Swat Post

== Political career ==
During the 1990s he was the first founding member of Pakistan Tehrek-e-Insaf (PTI). He remained member of the Provincial Cabinet of the PTI from Swat district. He also remained President of PTI in Swat district.h

However he left the PTI and became a professional journalist.

== YouTube ==
In December 2021, Sherin Zada received Silver Play Button for reaching 10 million subscribers on YouTube. He is the first field journalist from the Khyber Pakhtunkhwa province of Pakistan to reach this milestone.

== Lectures at universities ==
He had given lectures in various universities i.e., University of Gujrat, Pakistan, University of Punjab, Pakistan in various national and international events abroad.

== Lakes discoveries as trekker ==
Sherin Zada discovered 30 Lakes in the Swat Valley and allied districts as trekker and had coverage for the different news channels.

== Selected work ==
He also covered for the first time for the media/TV.

- Snow Jeep Rally in Kalam Swat Valley
- Lowari Top Snow Jeep Rally Report
- Snowfall in Swat Valley Very Cold Weather Tourist Enjoy
- Kalam Road Latest Condition 2016
- Swat Highest Waterfall in Pakistan
- Monte Bondone Ski resort, Trento, Italy
- Lamchar Waterfall in Upper Dir
- Kandol Lake, Swat Valley
- Stopa, Swat Valley; Amluk Dara History of Buddha
- Historical Fort in Swat Valley, Pakistan
- Pashto Singer Gul Panra Interview
- Malala Yousafzai Exclusive Interview with Sherin Zada after Nobel Peace Prize Ceremony in Oslo, Norway
- Nobel Peace Prize Award Ceremony coverage for Express TV
- Nobel Peace Prize Award Ceremony; Oslo, Norway
- Malala Yousafzai Nobel Peace Prize Celebration in Swat Valley, Pakistan
- Malala Spent Her 17th Birthday In Nigeria - Report
- Ghost Schools in Najigram, Swat Valley
- Ghost Schools in Swat Valley, Pakistan
- Education in Swat Pakistan Report
- Environment and Natural Forests in Swat Valley, Pakistan
- Nature's blessing: Apple Orchards at Risk Due to Negligence in Swat Valley
