= COVID-19 pandemic in Qom =

- Disease: Coronavirus disease 2019
- Pathogen: Novel coronavirus
- First outbreak: Wuhan, Hubei, China
- Index case: Qom
- Arrival date: 18 February 2020
- Confirmed cases: 1,144

The first confirmed cases of the global COVID-19 pandemic in Iran were reported on 18 February 2020 in Qom.

Although previously suspected cases of COVID-19 had been reported in Iran, on the last day of Bahman 1398 (February 18, 2020), following the death of two patients with respiratory complications at Kamkar-Arabnia Hospital, rumors about their death caused by coronavirus emerged. However, Qom University of Medical Sciences denied the rumors about the two deceased patients being infected with coronavirus, stating that no diagnostic evidence of COVID-19 had been found at that time.

Eventually, on 19 February, the Public Relations Office of the Ministry of Health announced that preliminary tests of two suspected cases were positive for coronavirus.

== Satellite images and mass graves ==
On 22 March, The Washington Post published satellite images of the Behesht-e Masoumeh cemetery in Qom, writing: "The graves dug for coronavirus victims in Qom are so extensive that they are visible from space." According to The Washington Post, the digging of new graves began on February 21 (the day of parliamentary elections) and rapidly expanded in the following days. Given that at the time Iranian officials reported only two deaths, digging such large trenches seemed unusual and strange. Only one week later, two large pits visible in satellite images are each as long as a football field.

== Origin of the disease ==
The exact origin of the outbreak in Qom is not clearly determined. The head of Mashhad University of Medical Sciences, Mohammad Hossein Bahraini, mentioned the presence of 700 Chinese seminarians in the Qom Seminary as one of the factors contributing to the spread of coronavirus in this religious city. One of the first victims of the virus was the brother of a doctor in the city of Qom. According to statements from a physician close to him, this person stated that only after a week of insistence by him was his brother tested for COVID-19, and after his death, the test result came back positive. Dozens of others with similar symptoms have died without being tested, and other causes were registered as their official cause of death. His brother had no history of foreign travel and had contracted the virus in Qom.

Two reported COVID-19 patients by the Ministry of Health and Medical Education in Qom were elderly individuals from two separate districts of Qom, with no history of foreign travel or travel outside the province.

The Minister of Health announced that one of the deceased in Qom was a merchant who had traveled to China.

== Qom quarantine dispute ==
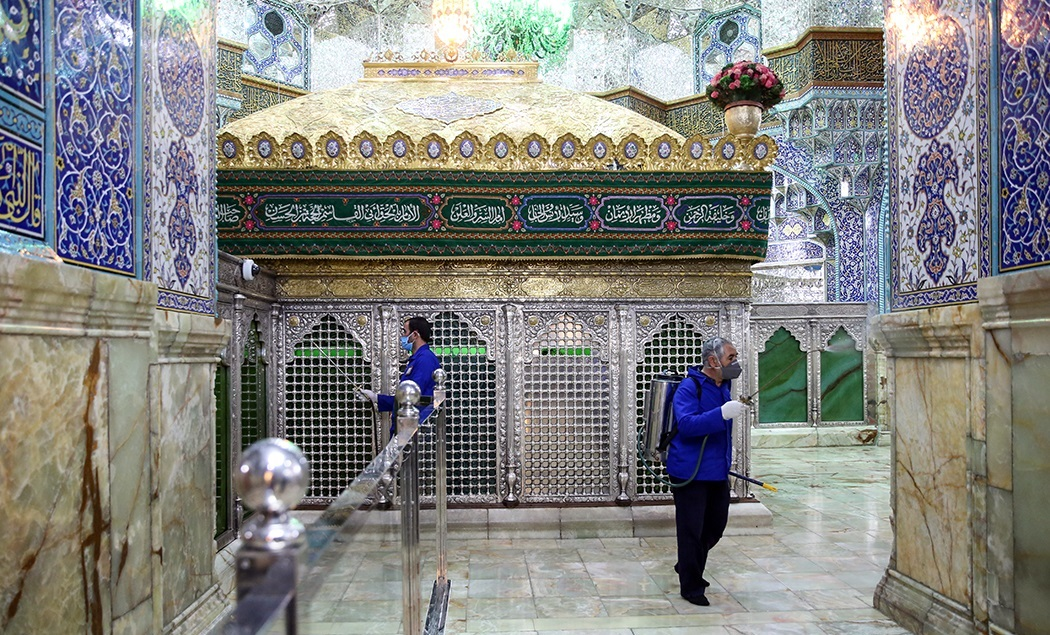
Disinfection of the Shrine of Fatemeh Masoumeh in Qom

According to Iran International, Iranian media reported that on February 21, the Supreme National Security Council held a meeting attended by the Iranian Minister of Health. Iran International reported that the Ministry of Health requested that Qom be quarantined, but this request was opposed by Hossein Taeb, head of the Intelligence Organization of the Islamic Revolutionary Guard Corps, in the meeting. He stated that Qom is the "honor of Islam" and that quarantining it would lead to exploitation by American media. Earlier, while the Ministry of Health had proposed temporary restrictions on travel to religious and pilgrimage sites in Qom, this measure was not implemented by the officials of Qom's religious sites. On February 20, Kianoush Jahanpour, the spokesperson for Iran's Ministry of Health, criticized the lack of limitation on gatherings at religious centers, including pilgrimage sites in Qom Province.

Seyyed Mohammad Saeedi, the custodian of the Shrine of Fatemeh Masoumeh and Friday Prayer Leader of Qom, reacted to the spread of the coronavirus in Qom and the possibility of quarantining the city, stating:

“Donald Trump, this evil, filthy, and wicked man, targeted the holy city of Qom and wants to culturally and reputationally damage Qom under the pretext of the Corona phenomenon. Trump, the traitor, and internal mercenaries will bury their wish for Qom's failure.”

In another stance, Saeedi described the Shrine of Masoumeh as a "Dar al-Shafa" (house of healing) where people go to seek healing for physical and spiritual ailments.

On February 26, the official website of the Shrine of Masoumeh published a note protesting the decision by the Qom Provincial Security Council to disinfect the shrine. It claimed that "the shrine's structures, due to the use of silver at the highest antibacterial level, serve as a strong barrier against the coronavirus epidemic."

Seyyed Ali Akbar Hosseini-Nejad, advisor to the custodian of the Shrine of Fatemeh Masoumeh, in response to calls for the temporary closure of the shrine to prevent further spread of coronavirus, said:

“What necessity is there to close the shrine? People should be careful themselves. Closing the shrine sends a bitter message; this place is a refuge for people and sitting in a corner of the shrine and courtyard does not cause problems. The enemy wants to use this method to create fear in hearts and portray Qom as an unsafe city and to take revenge for all its defeats from Qom.”

Asadollah Bayat-Zanjani, a Shia religious authority, in response to a religious inquiry regarding the temporary closure of shrines and religious sites, stated:

“In this matter, the criterion is the opinion of health and medical officials, and if they recommend closure or traffic restrictions, following this recommendation is a religious duty and disobedience is not permissible.”

Ultimately, on March 16, a joint statement was issued by Bahram Sarmast, governor of Qom, and the custodians of the Fatemeh Masoumeh Shrine and Jamkaran Mosque, announcing the closure of these two religious sites. Some religious individuals gathered in front of the gates of the Fatemeh Masoumeh Shrine in protest, breaking one of the entrance doors. Similar incidents occurred in Mashhad, where protesters chanted "Heydar, Heydar" and forcibly entered the shrine.

These attacks were widely condemned, and the Qom Seminary also called them acts of desecration. Two of the attackers were arrested by law enforcement.
