= Şirin =

Şirin is a Turkish form of the Persian name Sherine. Notable people with the name include:

== Given name ==
- Şirin Hatun (died c. 1521), consort of Ottoman Sultan Bayezid II
- Şirin Pancaroğlu (born 1968), Turkish harpist

== Surname ==
- Arif Şirin (1949–2019), Turkish composer
- Gökhan Şirin (born 1990, Turkish basketball player
- Osman Şirin (born 1943), Turkish judge
