= Members of the Covenant =

Aspect of early Syriac Christianity

The Members of the Covenant were a proto-monastic group in early Syriac Christianity. The first record of them is found in the fourth century. The practice is in the process of being revived today in the Syriac churches and there exists communities of monks part of this.

== Overview ==
Before the advent of true monasticism (which developed in the desert of Egypt), most Syriac churches consisted of a community focused around the "members of the covenant": men and women who had committed themselves to celibacy and the service of the church.

With only a few exceptions, Syrian monks learned to live among the people, both Christian and non-Christian, living the strict ascetic lifestyle while still maintaining full cohesion in the world. The eastern ascetics saw their spiritually disciplined life as a journey of steps, each finding oneself on a stairway of godliness that led ultimately towards eternity with God.

== Etymology ==
The name is the English translation of the Syriac bnay qyāmâ (ܒܢܝ ܩܝܡܐ) (or benai qyama), literally sons of the covenant. A male member of the covenant was called bar qyāmâ (ܒܪ ܩܝܡܐ) (or Bnay Qyām), son of the covenant; a female member was bat qyāmâ (ܒܪܬ ܩܝܡܐ) or Bnāt Qyāmā), daughter of the covenant. Members were also known as ihìdaye, or ‘single-minded ones’.

== Background ==
=== Third Century ===
From its beginning, Syriac Christianity was intrinsically an ascetical faith built on its reactions to, and adoptions from Marcionism and Manichaeism, among other cultural influences, which promoted the Christian faith as one of radical dedication and sacrifice. Where many Egyptian monks saw Anthony the Great as their figurehead and felt they needed to escape Roman rule in order to live ascetic lives, Syriac ascetics remained enmeshed in the church and the ‘lost’ culture that surrounded them.

The overwhelming presence of Western monasticism was not foreign to Syrian Christians seeking ascetic life. Theodoret gives historians a rendition of the early individualistic tendencies of Syrian monks in his book about their history. Notable examples of extreme asceticism included the βοσκοί boskoi "grazers", monks who lived in the wild and were often mistaken for strange animals. Wrapped in goatskins or straw mats, they avoided all forms of artificial clothing or shelter and only ate what they were given or they found growing on the ground. St Ephrem, writing in the mid-4th century, gave a very similar description of the Syriac ascetics who rejected all forms of civilization and lived out in the open in a primeval manner.

During the early centuries of Christianity, Christian groups in the regions of the Sasanian Empire were developing and expressing themselves in radically different ways as there was no overarching rule for the new faith (unlike Christians living in Roman Empire). In contrast to the staunch individualistic faith seen in the rural wildernesses around them, Christians in Persian urban areas were more intent on creating a community of believers by creating and transforming it through Christian discipleship. "From the earliest times asceticism played an integral and affirming role in the communities and the faith of Syrian Christians ... discipleship to Christ, lived out by laymen and women through varying degrees ... constituted the highest expression of Christian life." Communal monasticism became more and more common during the early part of the fourth century, leaving behind the influences of the Egyptian ascetic paradigm.

== Emergence of the Members of the Covenant ==
=== Fourth Century ===
During the fourth century and beyond, the image of Christians as "strangers" emerged. Monks of this lineage acted as a missionary to their communities, building a life around hospitality to others, serving the poor such as by becoming service personnel in hospitals. The Qeiama were listed together with the priests and deacons, and were instructed to "remain continually in the worship service of the church and not cease the times of prayer and psalmody night and day." Moreover, the Sons of the Covenant had administrative duties; no one was permitted to be a rabbaita ("steward") of the church unless no qeiama was available. "We must be reminded that the first Christian impulses in the lands of the Euphrates and Tigris did not come from Hellenistic Christianity via Antioch but from Palestinian Jewish Christianity ... these archaic conditions, which understood the qeiama as the whole congregation of celibates who alone were admitted to baptism and sacramental life, were tenacious and were able to last for generations.". St Aphrahat, writing between 337 and 345, described the ascetic life as being a separation from the world, noting in his 6th Demonstration: "We should be aliens from this world, just as Christ did not belong to this world." He equated the term "holiness" with "virgin" in both a literal sense and to symbolize uncontamination from the world.

During this time historical records of the Syrian church indicate that they began to initiate Roman concepts of church into their practice. This led to divisions between the benai and benat qeiama and the married and vocational members of the church who were also active participants in society. However, the two groups were able to merge and adopted a syncretism of belief in which they understood their spiritual growth as steps.

== Practical Life ==
From the beginning of the fourth century, the Sons and Daughters of the Covenant saw their mission as deeply interwoven with the congregational church. The members of the qeiama understood themselves to be equivalent to modern-day deacons. These individuals, sworn to an ascetic and celibate life, served liturgical and public functions within Syriac churches and communities.

Members usually lived together or with family members, but there are instances of the benat qeiama living in convents and other communal organizations where they could live and study together. Each of them took the vow of chastity in becoming a member of the covenant, and through this vow they saw themselves as "brides of Christ". They followed strict rules that did not allow them to be out after dark or for the benat to live with a man. Other rules included avoiding meat, wine, and any wealth beyond their basic needs. They were also forbidden from demanding money from non-members, and were instead to look after the welfare of poor people. They had a judicial law that sent dysfunctional covenanters to a secluded monastery and renamed them bart qeiama, denoting their failure to live up to the life-covenant to which they were called.

Functionally the qeiama were students and servants of the clergy. There were certain rules against a Son or Daughter becoming a hireling or staff for a farmer, or any other vocation; they were to be completely devoted to the works and ministries of the church. Members of the qeiama were also directly involved with the worship service itself. Outside of the worship service, the benai and benat qeiama were set to the task of serving and blessing others in the congregation, as well as those not connected to a place of Christian faith.

A hospital was built from the efforts of one congregation's Covenant Group. "Active believers and energetic deacons were appointed to direct the work, but for the actual service, Rabbula employed the benai qeiama." Roles were mirrored for the women's hospital built nearby. Qeiama also established charities for lepers in their villages and built shelters for the poor and destitute.

Qeiama were seen as vital to the Christian community. One source remarking on the necessity of the Covenant members states, "the churches and monasteries will be constituted (or will have their existence) through them."

== Legacy ==
Aphrahat was a Syriac Christian author in the Persian/Sasanian Empire who composed his Demonstrations around 340AD. It is believed that he was a Member of the Covenant and Demonstration No 6 concerned this group. He noted that originally the term ‘covenant’ designated the entire baptized community, who had also undertaken certain ascetic vows at baptism; however, by the time he knew them, the ‘sons and daughters of the covenant’ represented an smaller group within the baptized community, consisting of people who were either celibate or married couples who had renounced intercourse. Saint Ephrem (also Ephraim or Ephream) is also believed to have been a member of the group. He is the only Syriac Christian to be proclaimed as a Doctor of the Church.

As with many Christian groups, the Members found themselves under persecution. Widespread persecution of Christians in the Persian Sasanian Empire started in the early 340s under Shapur II (r. 309-379), a period which coincided with renewed conflict against the newly-Christian Roman Empire.

By the medieval period much of the community had become assimilated into members of the clergy as priests and monks. The community had largely disappeared by the tenth century. Today, most Syriac Christians follow either the West Syriac Rite (following the Divine Liturgy of Saint James) or the East Syriac Rite (following the Divine Liturgy of Saints Addai and Mari).

== See also ==
- Desert Fathers
- Therapeutae
