= Shirin Towfigh =

Iranian-American surgeon

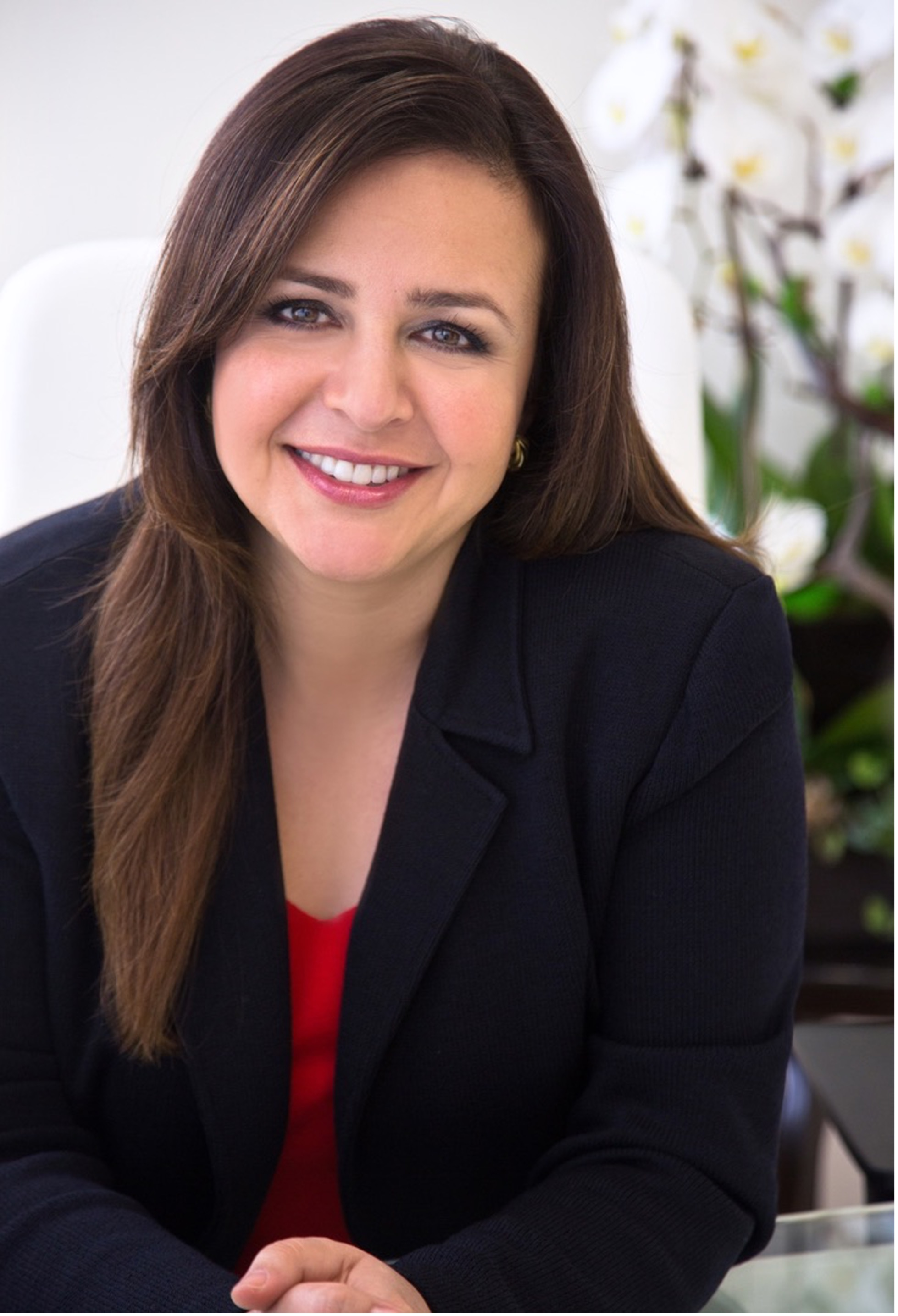
- Born: 1971 (age 54–55); Tehran, Iran
- Education: University of California, Los Angeles (B.S.); University of California, San Diego (M.D.)
- Occupations: Minimally Invasive Hernia Surgeon, Innovator
- Known for: Minimally Invasive Hernia Surgery, Women in Surgery
- Board member of: American Board of Surgery

Shirin Towfigh (born 1971) is an American surgeon who specializes in minimally invasive hernia surgery. She is the president and founder of the Beverly Hills Hernia Center, a specialty clinic launched in 2013 for treating hernias and hernia-related complications. She is also the CEO of Hexagon Health.

== Early life and education ==
Towfigh was born in 1971 in the capital city of Tehran, Iran, and she moved to the United States with her family at the age of two. After completing her primary education at Santa Monica High School, she completed her undergraduate education at the University of California, Los Angeles (UCLA). During her undergraduate years, Towfigh first realized her passion for medicine.

Towfigh attended the University of California, San Diego (UCSD) for medical school. It was in her clerkship year that she gained an interest in surgery. After completing medical school, she moved back to Los Angeles, where she completed a general surgical residency at UCLA in 2002. Her interest in minimally invasive laparoscopic surgery was sparked during residency, as she was interested in laparoscopy due to potentials in technological advancements.

== Surgical career ==
After completing her residency, she joined the University of Southern California and the Los Angeles County Hospital. There, she worked with renowned laparoscopic surgeons such as Jeffrey Peters, and Namir Katkhouda. She worked as the lead surgeon to underserved patients with complex hernia problems during her time at the County Hospital, which later motivated her to pursue a career in hernia surgery. She joined Cedars-Sinai Department of Surgery in 2008 to help advance the surgical education program. There, she was mentored by laparoscopic surgeons Edward Phillips and George Berci. While at Cedars-Sinai Medical Center, she focused her surgical practice on the treatment of hernias and hernia related complications. She is known as the "Queen of Hernias" among her colleagues.

Towfigh decided to advance hernia care as a private practicing surgeon, saying "why would I choose to be employed with… a whole hierarchy of administrative bosses, when I can be my own boss, without a ceiling on growth?". In 2013, she inaugurated the Beverly Hills Hernia Center, a multi-disciplinary clinic that cares for hernia patients with various hernia-related issues. Through her work at Hexagon Health, Towfigh holds multiple patents in hernia mesh innovation.

== Academic career ==
As the Chief Resident in 2002, Towfigh was awarded the Golden Apple Award for Outstanding Teaching by the UCLA School of Medicine and the Golden Scalpel Award in Recognition of Teaching Excellence in the UCLA Department of Surgery. In 2023, she was awarded the Golden Apple teaching award by the residents at Cedars-Sinai for outstanding teaching. She teaches and mentors residents and fellows across the country. "I am a great advocate of mentorship and learning from surgical history," said Towfigh in 2021.

She has held leadership positions in surgery locally and internationally. Towfigh was the first female President of the American College of Surgeons, Southern California Chapter from 2015-2016. She has served as Governor to the American College of Surgeons and to the American Hernia Society. She is an active member of numerous national and international hernia societies, such as the American Hernia Society, International Hernia Collaboration, and Society of American Gastrointestinal and Endoscopic Surgeons (SAGES). She received the SAGES Member Spotlight Award in 2021 and the SAGES Recognition of Excellence Award in 2022.

== Advocacy ==
Towfigh is an advocate of women in surgery. She hosted the first Women in Surgery event in Los Angeles in 2002, which evolved into an integrated Women in Surgery mentorship event held at the annual meeting of the Southern California Chapter of the American College of Surgeons. Towfigh promotes the importance of hernias in women via research publications, lectures and podcasts. She was spotlighted for her work on hernias in women in The New York Times and The Washington Post.

Towfigh sponsors an annual research award, Female Factors in Hernia Award, to promote research on hernias in females. She is a surgical innovator and has patented gender-based designs of hernia mesh which are inspired by her experiences with mesh complications seen disparately among males and females.

== Publications ==
Towfigh has authored articles highlighting various aspects of hernia surgery and surgical education. She is the co-Editor of the texbook SAGES Manual of Groin Pain.

=== Selected articles ===
- Huynh, Desmond; Feng, Xiaoxi; Fadaee, Negin; Gonsalves, Nicholas; Towfigh, Shirin (September 2022). "Outcomes from laparoscopic versus robotic mesh removal after inguinal hernia repair". Surgical Endoscopy. 36 (9): 6784–6788. doi:10.1007/s00464-021-08963-4. ISSN 0930-2794. PMID 34981232.
- Liang, Mike K.; Holihan, Julie L.; Itani, Kamal; Alawadi, Zeinab M.; Gonzalez, Juan R. Flores; Askenasy, Erik P.; Ballecer, Conrad; Chong, Hui Sen; Goldblatt, Matthew I.; Greenberg, Jacob A.; Harvin, John A.; Keith, Jerrod N.; Martindale, Robert G.; Orenstein, Sean; Richmond, Bryan (January 2017). "Ventral Hernia Management: Expert Consensus Guided by Systematic Review". Annals of Surgery. 265 (1): 80–89. doi:10.1097/SLA.0000000000001701. ISSN 0003-4932. PMID 28009730.
- Towfigh, Shirin (June 2018). "Inguinal Hernia". Surgical Clinics of North America. 98 (3): 623–636. doi:10.1016/j.suc.2018.02.004. PMID 29754626.
- Truong, Adam; Al-Aufey, Badr Saad; Towfigh, Shirin (August 2019). "Step-by-step guide to safe removal of pre-peritoneal inguinal mesh". Surgical Endoscopy. 33 (8): 2680–2685. doi:10.1007/s00464-018-6558-5. ISSN 0930-2794. PMID 30357522.
- Balthazar da Silveira CA, Mazzola Poli de Figueiredo S, Rasador ACD, Dias YM, Hernandez Martin RR, Fernandez MG, Towfigh S. Impact of patient's sex on groin hernia repair: A systematic review and meta-analysis. World J Surg. 2024 Sep 20. doi: 10.1002/wjs.12344. Epub ahead of print. PMID 39304983.

=== Chapters and books ===
- Jacob, Brian P.; Chen, David C.; Ramshaw, Bruce; Towfigh, Shirin, eds. (2016). The SAGES manual of groin pain. Cham Heidelberg New York Dordrecht London: Springer. ISBN 978-3-319-21586-0.
