= Pahlavi scripts =

Script of various Middle Iranian languages

- The word Ērānšahr in Book Pahlavi
- Script type: Abjad with logograms
- Period: c. 2nd century BC – c. 7th century AD
- Direction: Mixed
- Languages: Middle Iranian languages

Related scripts
- Parent systems: Egyptian hieroglyphs: Proto-Sinaitic; Phoenician alphabet; Aramaic alphabet; Pahlavi scripts
- Child systems: Inscriptional Parthian; Inscriptional Pahlavi; Psalter Pahlavi; Book Pahlavi; Avestan

ISO 15924
- ISO 15924: Prti, 130 (Inscriptional Parthian) Phli, 131 (Inscriptional Pahlavi); Phlp, 132 (Psalter Pahlavi) Phlv, 133 (Book Pahlavi)

Unicode
- Unicode range: U+10B60–U+10B7F Inscriptional Pahlavi; U+10B40–U+10B5F Inscriptional Parthian; U+10B80–U+10BAF Psalter Pahlavi

Pahlavi is an exclusively written form of various Middle Iranian languages, derived from the Aramaic script. It features Aramaic words used as heterograms (called huzwārišn, "archaisms").

Pahlavi compositions have been found for the dialects/ethnolects of Parthia, Persis, Sogdiana, Scythia, and Khotan. Independent of the variant for which the Pahlavi system was used, the written form of that language only qualifies as Pahlavi when it is both Aramaic-derived and features huzwārišn.

Pahlavi is then an admixture of:

- written Imperial Aramaic, from which Pahlavi derives its script, logograms, and some of its vocabulary.
- spoken Middle Iranian, from which Pahlavi derives its terminations, symbol rules, and most of its vocabulary.

Pahlavi may thus be defined as a system of writing applied to (but not unique for) a specific language group, but with critical features alien to that language group. It has the characteristics of a distinct language, but is not one. It is an exclusively written system, but much Pahlavi literature remains essentially an oral literature committed to writing and so retains many of the characteristics of oral composition.

== Etymology ==
The term Pahlavi is said to be derived from the Old Iranian word Parθava, meaning Parthia, a region just east of the Caspian Sea, with the -i suffix denoting the language and people of that region. If this etymology is correct, Parθava presumably became Pahlav through a semivowel glide rt (or in other cases rd) change to l, a common occurrence in language evolution (e.g., sāl < sard, zāl < zard, sālār < sardar and so on). The term has also been traced back to Avestan pərəthu- "broad [as the earth]", also evident in Sanskrit pṛthvi- "earth" and pārthiva "[lord] of the earth".

== History ==
The earliest documented use of the Pahlavi language (dialect) – in the Greek alphabet – dates back to the reign of Arsaces I of Parthia (250 BCE). The oldest evidence of Pahlavi script is from the reign of Mithridates I (r. 171–138 BCE). The cellars of the treasury at Mithradatkird near Nisa, Turkmenistan revealed thousands of pottery sherds with brief records; several ostraca that are fully dated bear references to members of the immediate family of the king.

Such fragments, as well as the rock inscriptions of Sasanian emperors, which are datable to the 3rd and 4th centuries, do not qualify as a significant literary corpus. Although in theory Pahlavi could have been used to render any Middle Iranian language and hence may have been in use as early as 300 BC, no manuscripts that can be dated to before the 6th century have yet been found. Thus, when used for the name of a literary genre, i.e. Middle Persian literature, the term refers to Middle Iranian, mostly Middle Persian, texts dated near or after the fall of the Sasanian Empire and (with exceptions) extending to about 900, after which Iranian languages enter the "modern" stage.

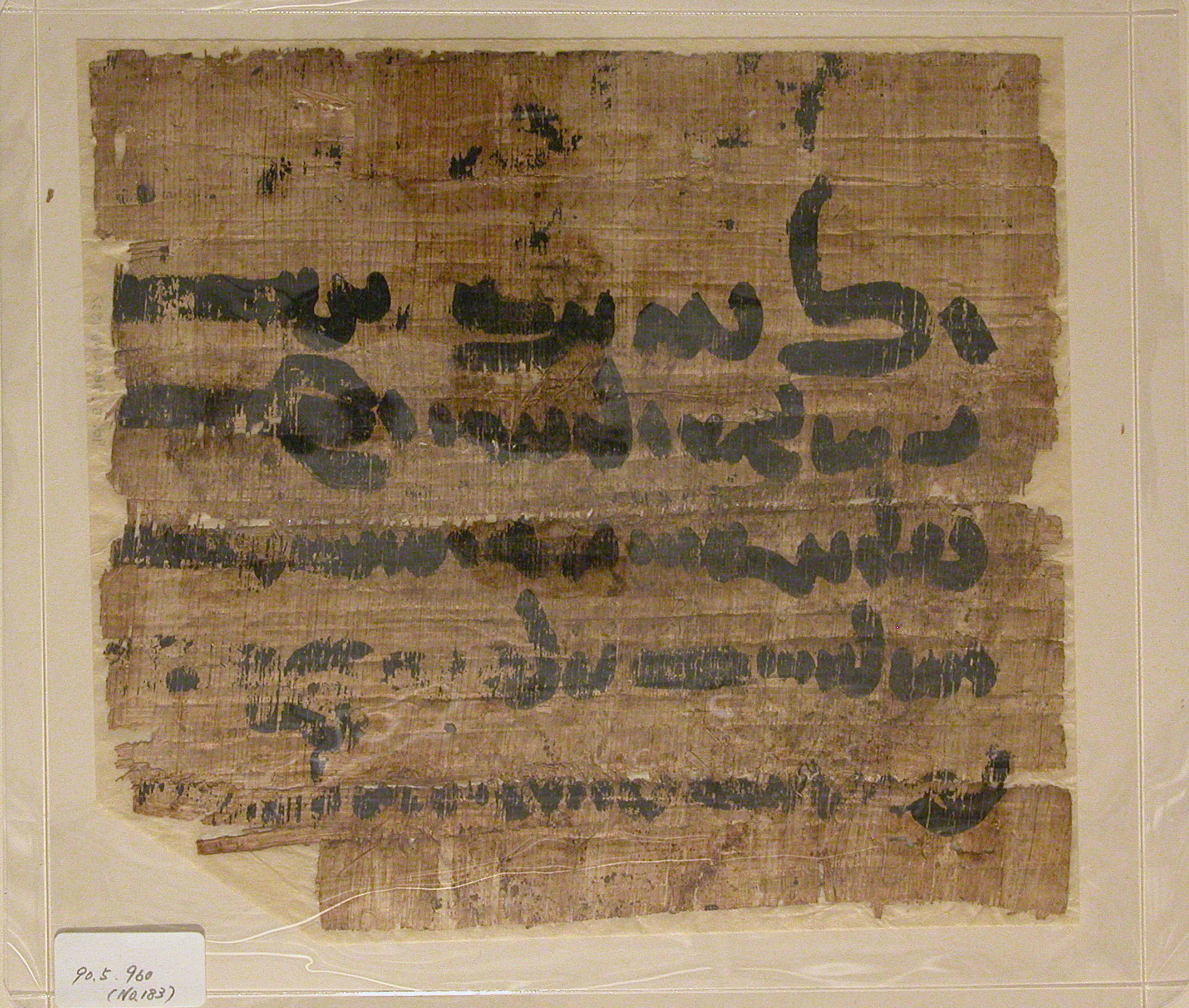
Private letter on papyrus in cursive Pahlavi script from the early 7th century, Metropolitan Museum of Art

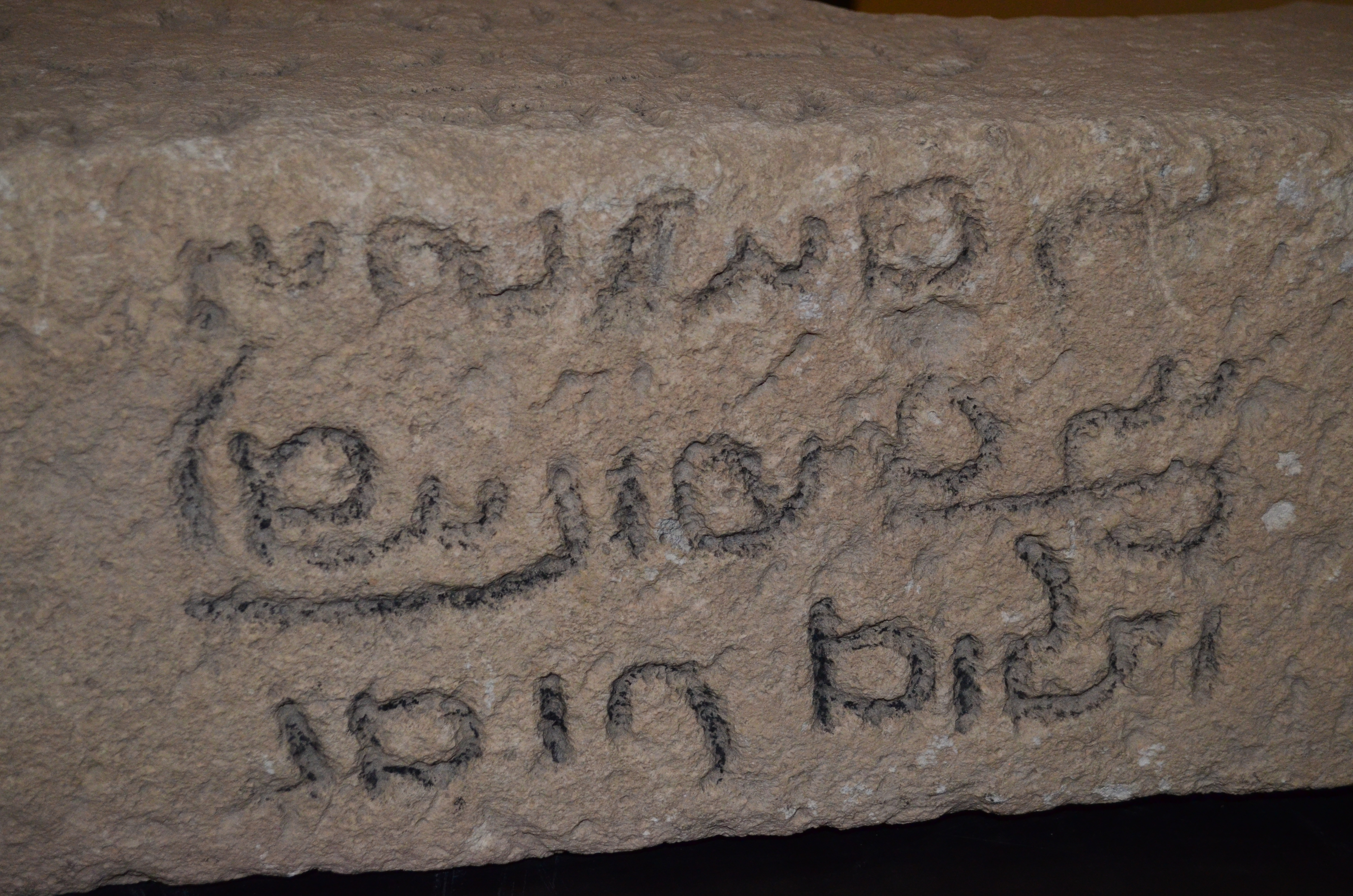
Sasanian tombstone in the Museum of Bishapur

The oldest surviving example of the Pahlavi literature is from fragments of the so-called "Pahlavi Psalter", a 6th- or 7th-century translation of a Syriac Psalter found at Bulayïq on the Silk Road, near Turpan in north-west China. It is in a more archaic script than Book Pahlavi.

After the Muslim conquest of Persia, the Pahlavi script was gradually replaced by the Arabic script except in Zoroastrian sacred literature, until the present day.

The replacement of the Pahlavi script by the Arabic script to write Persian happened in the ninth century under the Tahirid dynasty, the governors of Greater Khorasan.

=== Modern times ===
In the present day, "Pahlavi" is frequently identified with the prestige dialect of southwest Iran, formerly and properly called Fārsi, after Fars province. This practice can be dated to the period immediately following the Islamic conquest.

== Scripts ==
The Pahlavi script is one of the two essential characteristics of the Pahlavi system (see above). Its origin and development occurred independently of the various Middle Iranian languages for which it was used. The Pahlavi script is derived from the Aramaic script as it was used under the Sasanians, with modifications to support the phonology of the Iranian languages. It is essentially a typical abjad, where, in general, only long vowels are marked with matres lectionis (although short /i/ and /u/ are sometimes expressed so as well), and vowel-initial words are marked with an aleph. However, because of the high incidence of logograms derived from Aramaic words, the Pahlavi script is far from always phonetic; and even when it is phonetic, it may have more than one transliterational symbol per sign, because certain originally different Aramaic letters have merged into identical graphic forms – especially in the Book Pahlavi variety. (For a review of the transliteration problems of Pahlavi, see Henning.) In addition to this, during much of its later history, Pahlavi orthography was characterized by historical or archaizing spellings. Most notably, it continued to reflect the pronunciation that preceded the widespread Iranian lenition processes, whereby postvocalic voiceless stops and affricates had become voiced, and voiced stops had become semivowels. Similarly, certain words continued to be spelled with postvocalic ⟨s⟩ and ⟨t⟩ even after the consonants had been debuccalized to ⟨h⟩ in the living language.

The Pahlavi script consisted of two widely used forms: Inscriptional Pahlavi and Book Pahlavi. A third form, Psalter Pahlavi, is not widely attested.

=== Inscriptional Parthian ===
Although the Parthian Empire generally wrote in ancient Greek, some of the coins and seals of the Arsacid period (mid-3rd-century BCE to early 3rd century CE) also include inscriptions in the Parthian language. The script of these inscriptions is called inscriptional Parthian. Numerous clay fragments from Arsacid-era Parthia proper, in particular a large collection of fragments from Nisa that date to the reign of Mithridates I (r. 171–138 BCE), are likewise inscribed in inscriptional Parthian. The bilingual and trilingual inscriptions of the 3rd-century Sasanian Empire include Parthian texts, which were then also rendered in inscriptional Parthian. The Parthian language was a Middle Iranian language of Parthia proper, a region in the north-western segment of the Iranian plateau where the Arsacids had their power base.

Inscriptional Parthian script had 22 letters for sounds and 8 letters for numerals. The letters were not joined. Inscriptional Parthian has its own Unicode block.

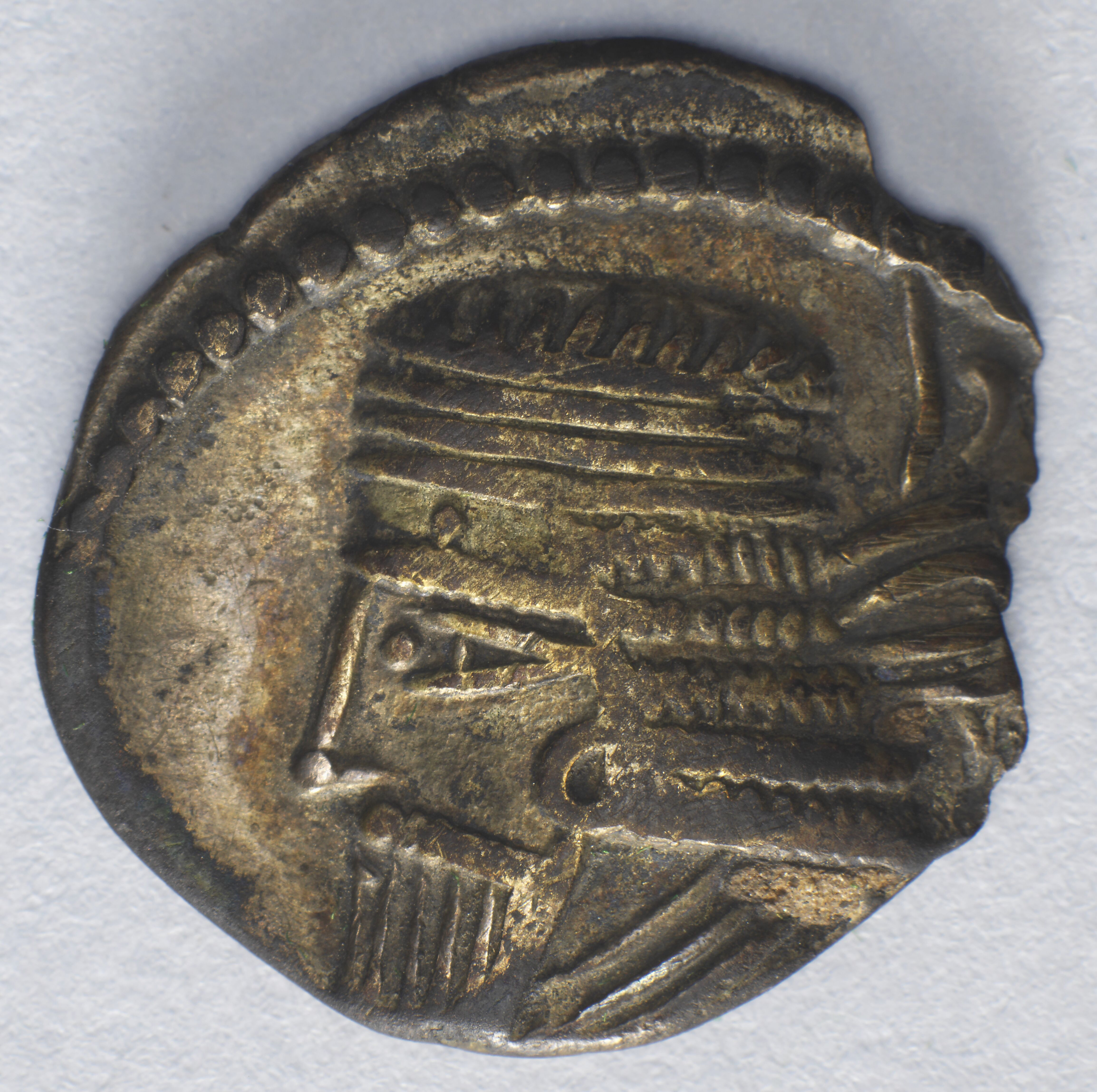
An abbreviation of the Parthian king's name was introduced on their coins by Vologases I. wl can be read behind the head on this coin's obverse side.

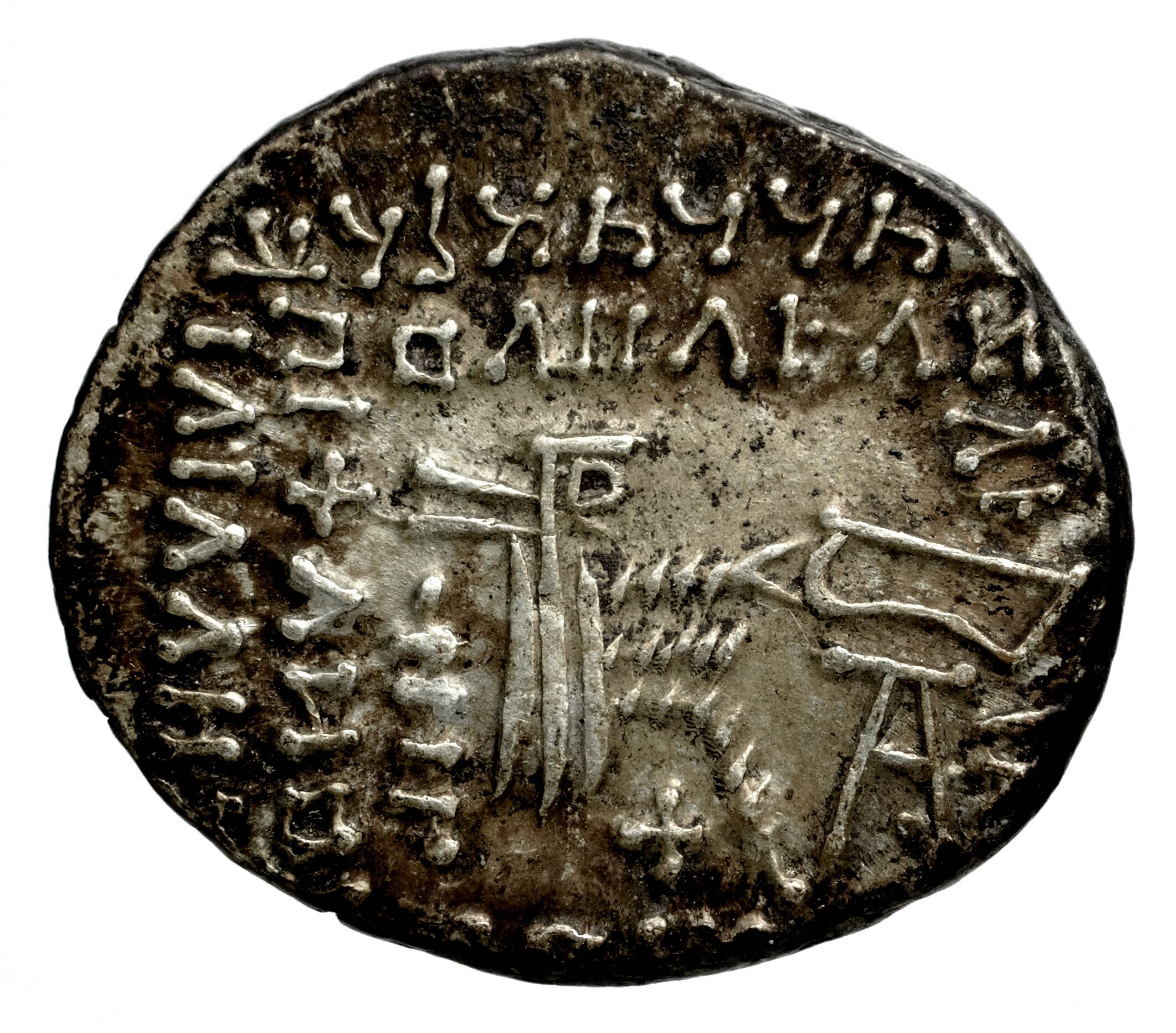
Reverse of a Parthian drahm. The legend at the top reads: [m]trdt MLKA (Note: 𐭌𐭕𐭓𐭃𐭕 𐭌𐭋𐭊𐭀). From Mithridates V on, the ruler's full name and title appeared in Parthian script on drahms, while also becoming increasingly stylized.

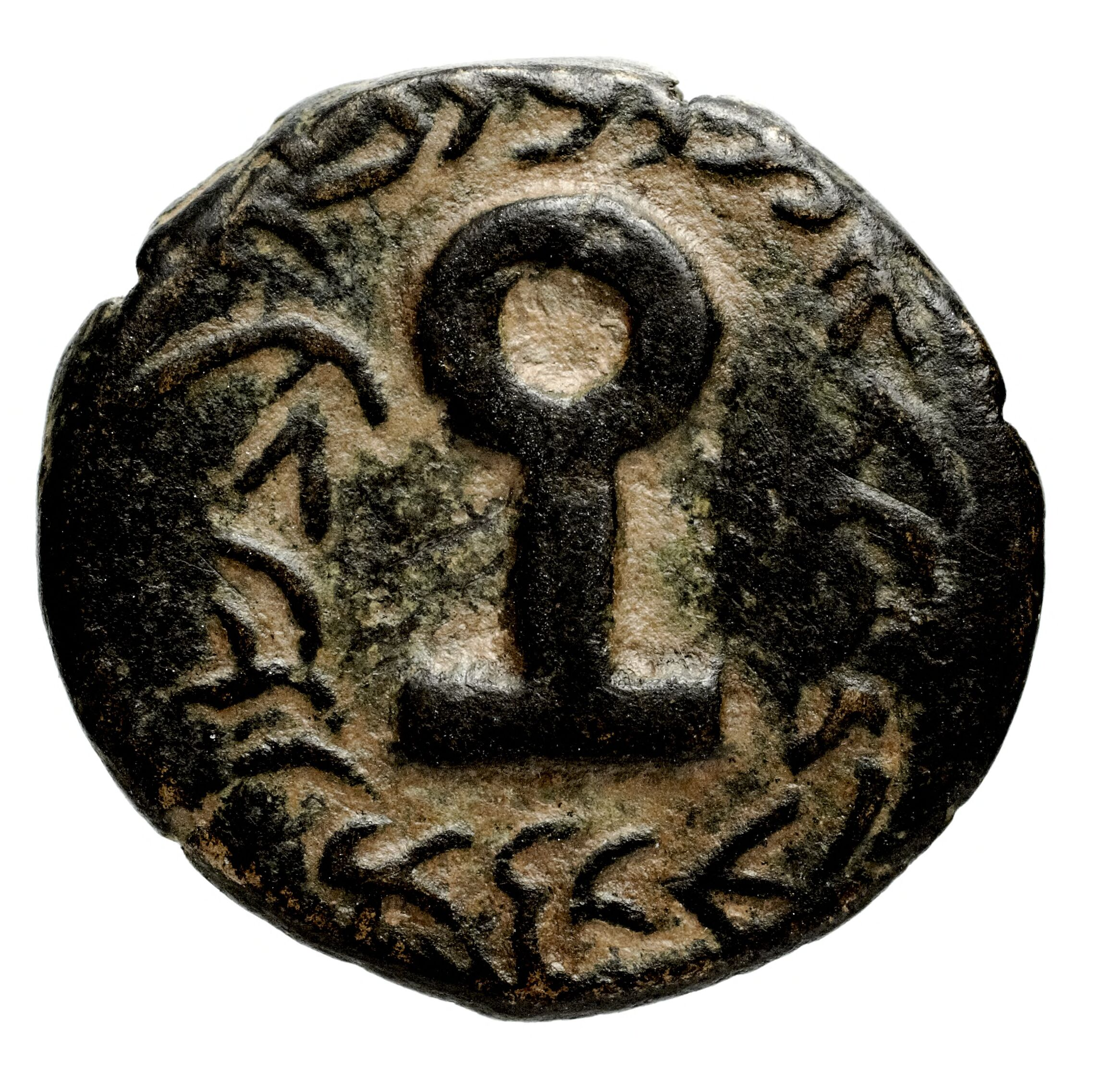
A probably commemorative bronze coin of Vologases IV (ca. 147–191 CE), with the legend ⤸ʾršk ⤹wlgšy ⤺MLKYN ⤻MLKA (Note: 𐭀𐭓𐭔𐭊 𐭅𐭋𐭂𐭔𐭉 𐭌𐭋𐭊𐭉𐭍 𐭌𐭋𐭊𐭀) 'Arsacid Vologases, king of kings'. Minted at Edessa.

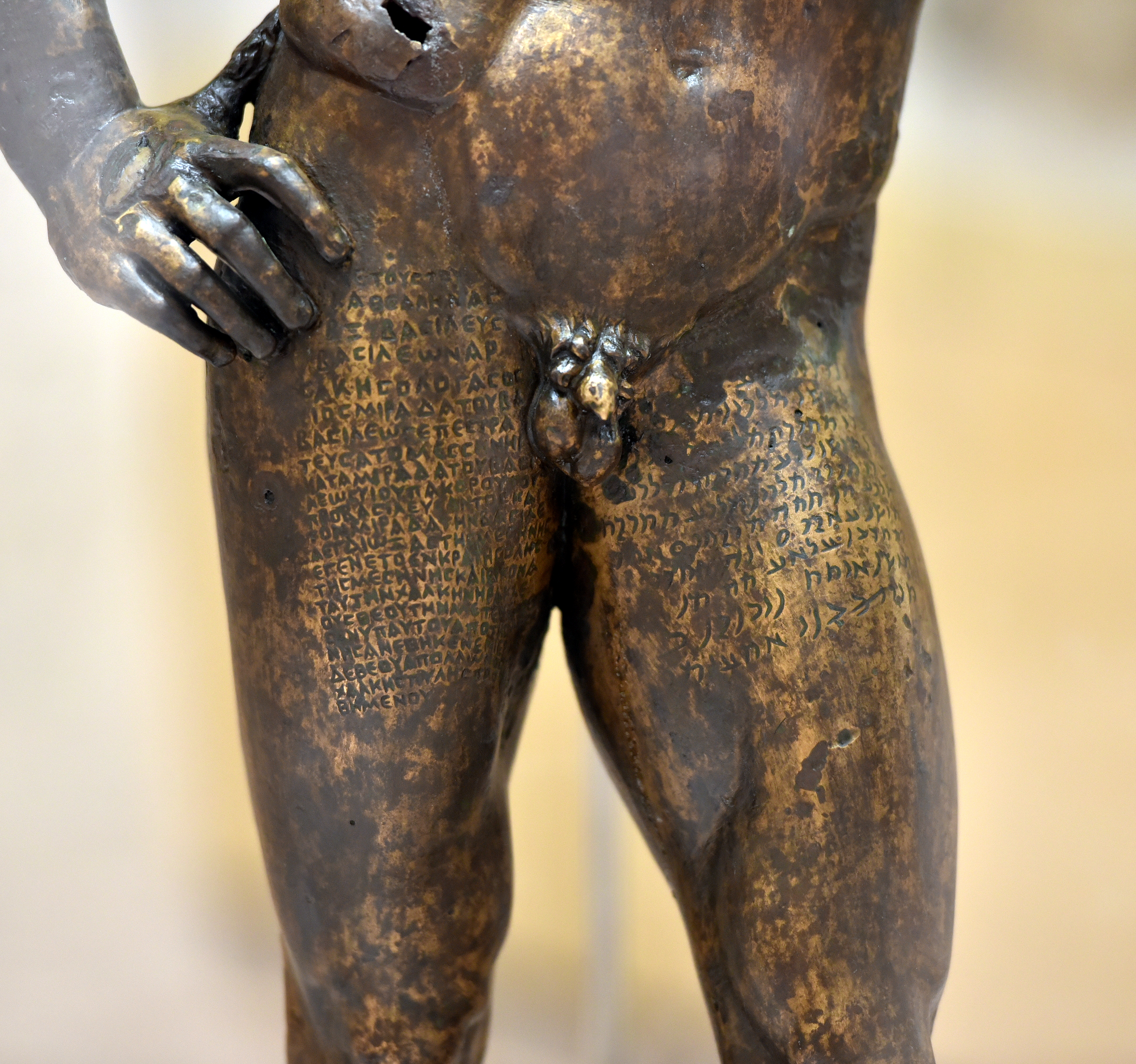
Greek and Parthian on a bronze statuette of Hercules from Seleucia on the Tigris. The inscription dates it to 151 CE. Housed in the Iraq Museum, Baghdad.

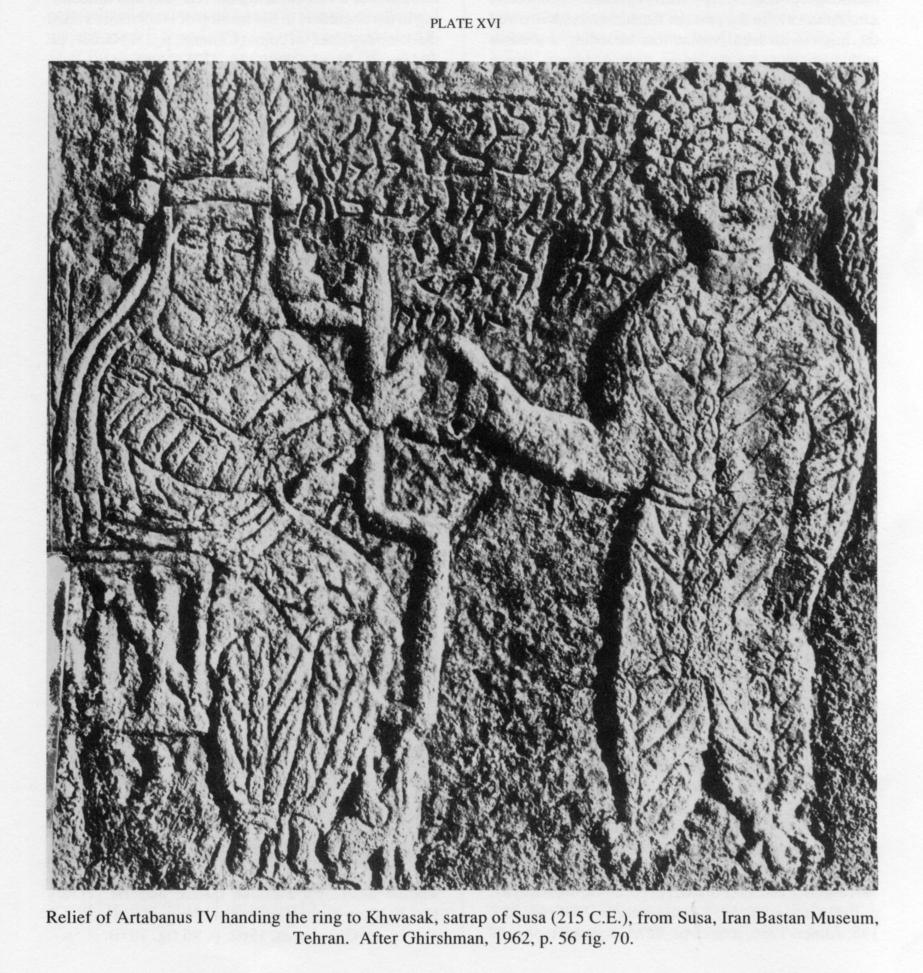
Relief of Artabanus IV handing the ring of power to Khwasak, satrap of Susa. From Susa, Iran Bastan Museum, Tehran, 215 CE

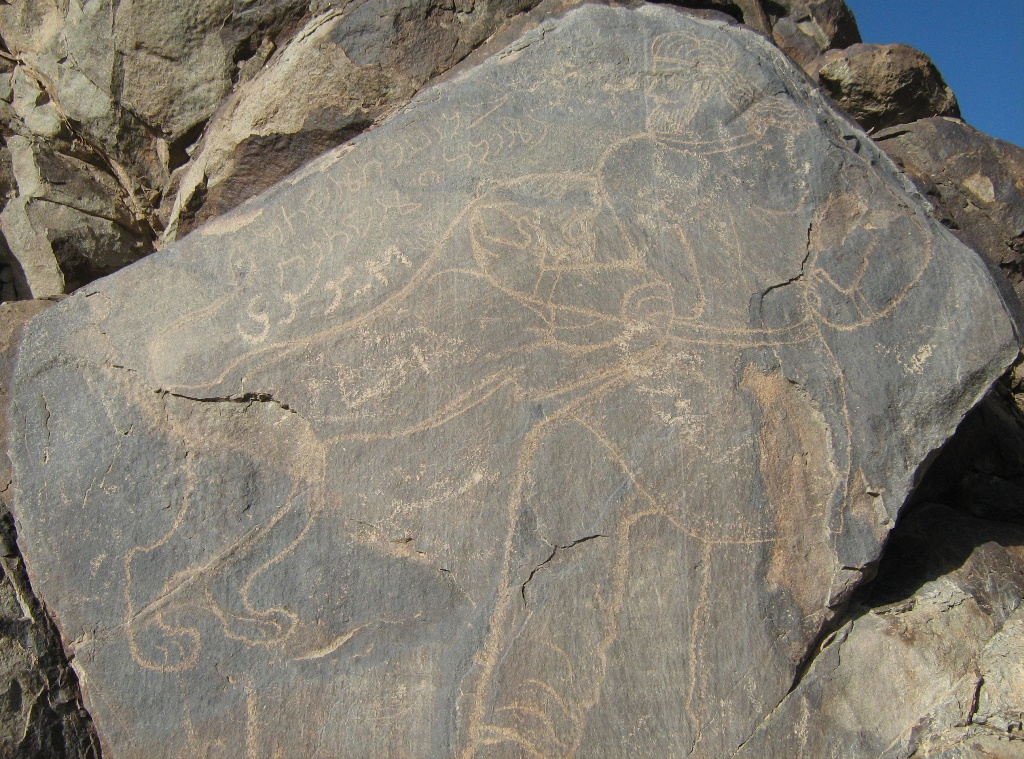
Inscription next to one of the petroglyphs of Kāl-i J̌angāl, a gorge near Birjand. (Note: 𐭂𐭓𐭉𐭀𐭓𐭕𐭇𐭔𐭕𐭓 \ 𐭍𐭇𐭅𐭃𐭓 𐭅 𐭇𐭔𐭕𐭓𐭐 [...] [...] gryʾrtḥštrn / ḥwdr W ḥštrp '[...] the prefect and satrap of Gryʾrtḥštr') Probably of early Sassanian date.

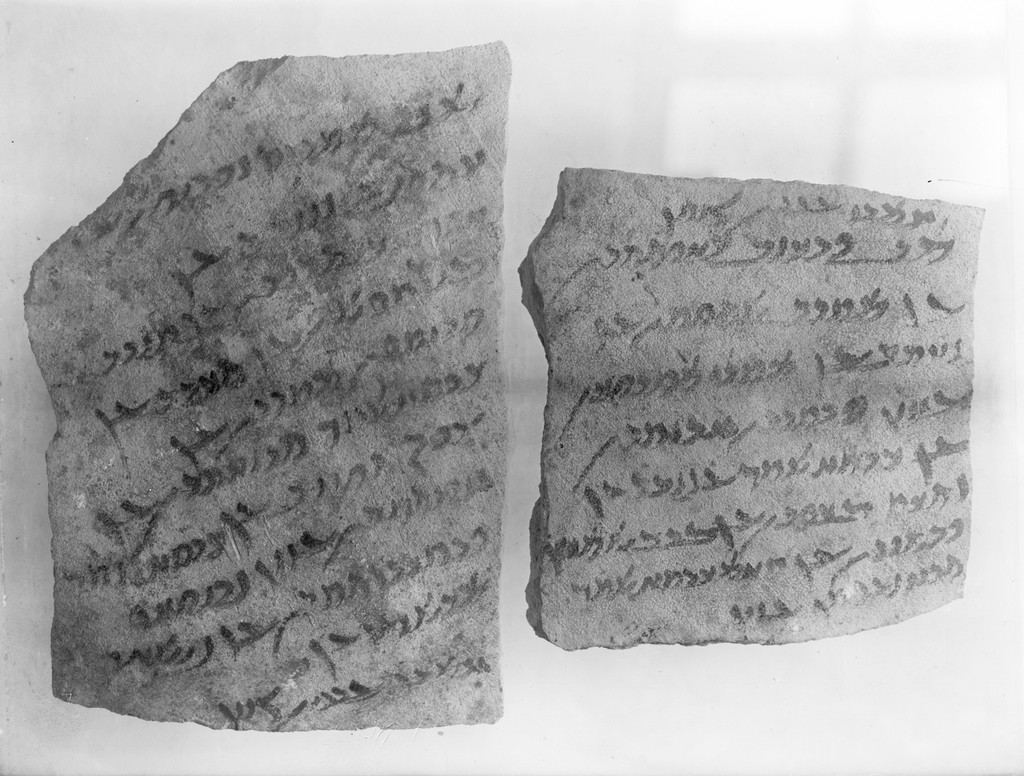
Ostraca from Dura-Europos

=== Inscriptional Pahlavi ===
Inscriptional Pahlavi is the name given to a variant of the Pahlavi script as used to render the 3rd–6th-century Middle Persian language inscriptions of the Sasanian emperors and other notables. Genuine Middle Persian, as it appears in these inscriptions, was the Middle Iranian language of Persia proper, the region in the south-western corner of the Iranian plateau where the Sasanians had their power base.

Inscriptional Pahlavi script had 19 characters, which were not joined.

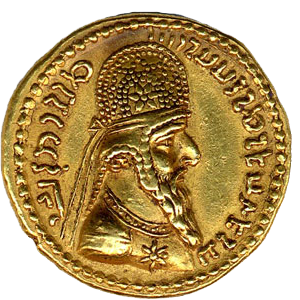
Sasanian coin (dinar) of Ardashir I (r. 224–42) inscribed: ⤹ mzdysn bgy ʼrthštr MLKA {...}.

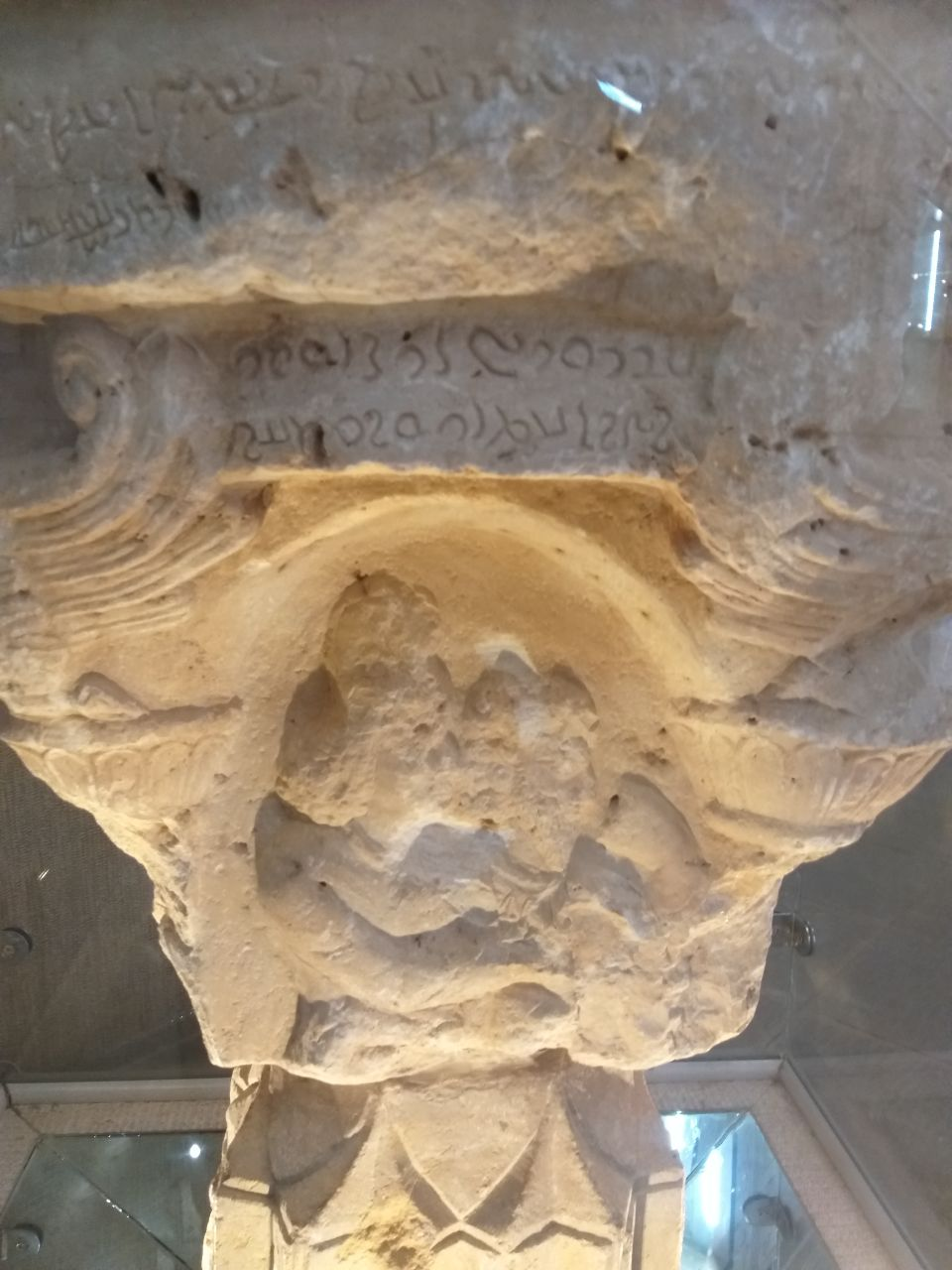
One side of the Nasrabad fire altar dedicated to Shapur I for his 243/4 victory over the Romans.

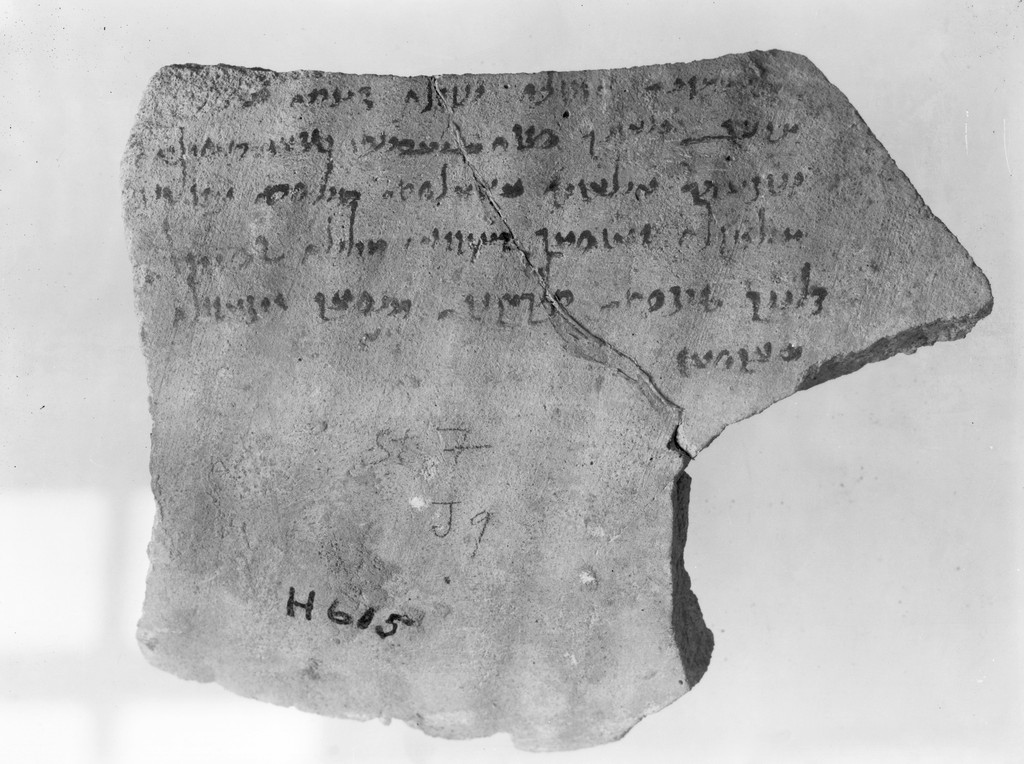
The one Middle Persian ostracon from Dura-Europos listing twenty-seven professions. (Note: Examples of listed professions: 𐭭𐭠𐭭𐭯𐭠𐭪 nʾnpʾk 'baker', 𐭪𐭯𐭱𐭪𐭫𐭩 kpškly 'shoemaker', 𐭪𐭱𐭲𐭪𐭫𐭩 kštkly 'plowman', 𐭦𐭩𐭭𐭣𐭠𐭭𐭩𐭪 zyndʾnyk 'jailer', 𐭣𐭯𐭩𐭫𐭯𐭲𐭩 dpylpty 'chief scribe', and 𐭮𐭠𐭯𐭮𐭲𐭭 šʾpstn 'harem keeper')

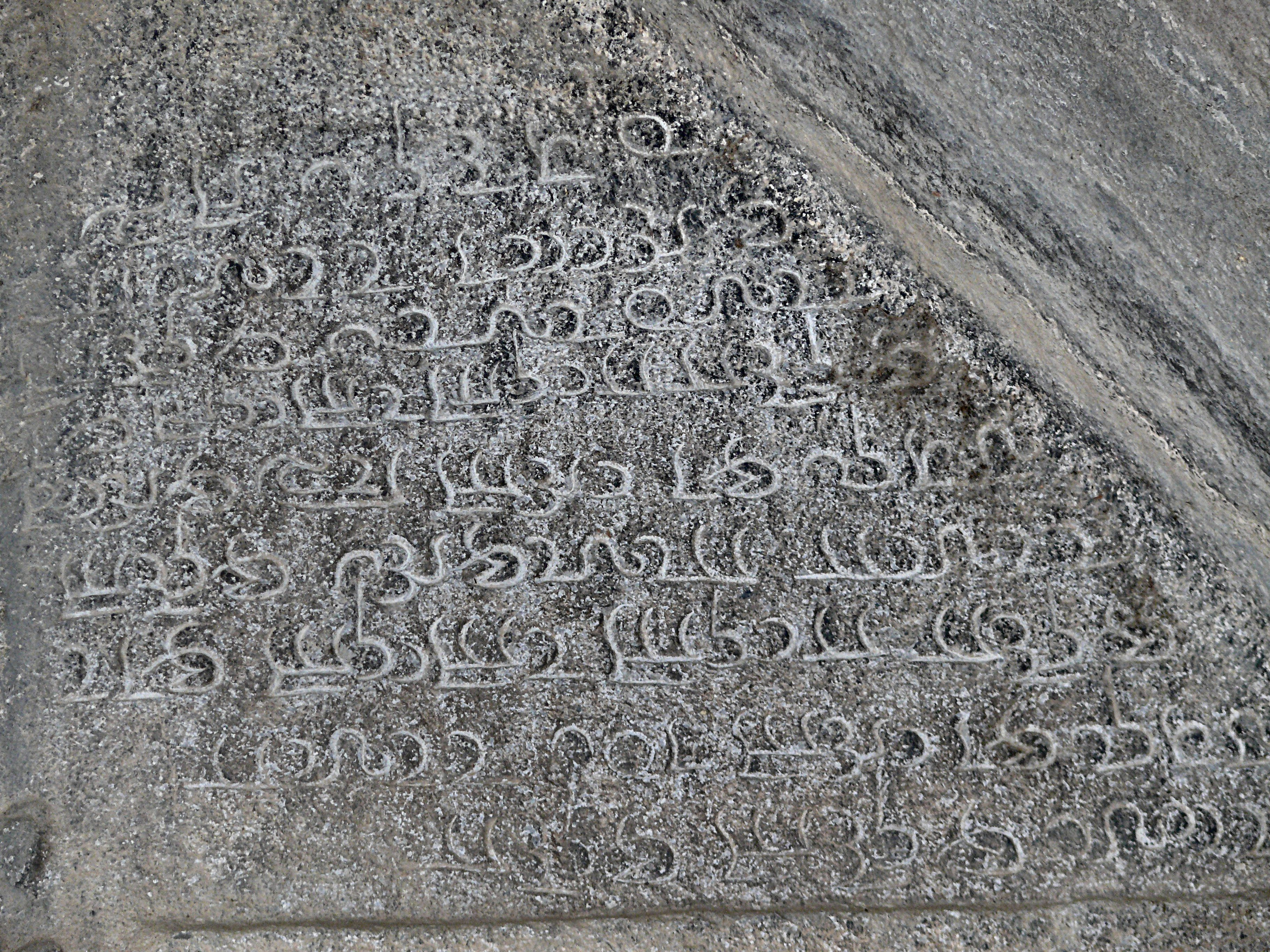
Inscription of Shapur II at Taq-e Bostan, including some rudimentary ligatures (letters joined on the baseline).

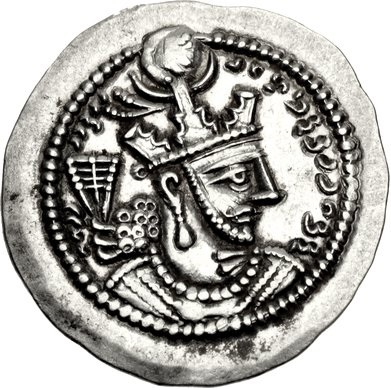
Drachm of Yazdegerd II (struck ca. 439-447) inscribed: ⤹ mzdysn bgy kdy yzdklty /Mazdesn bay Kay Yazdgard/.

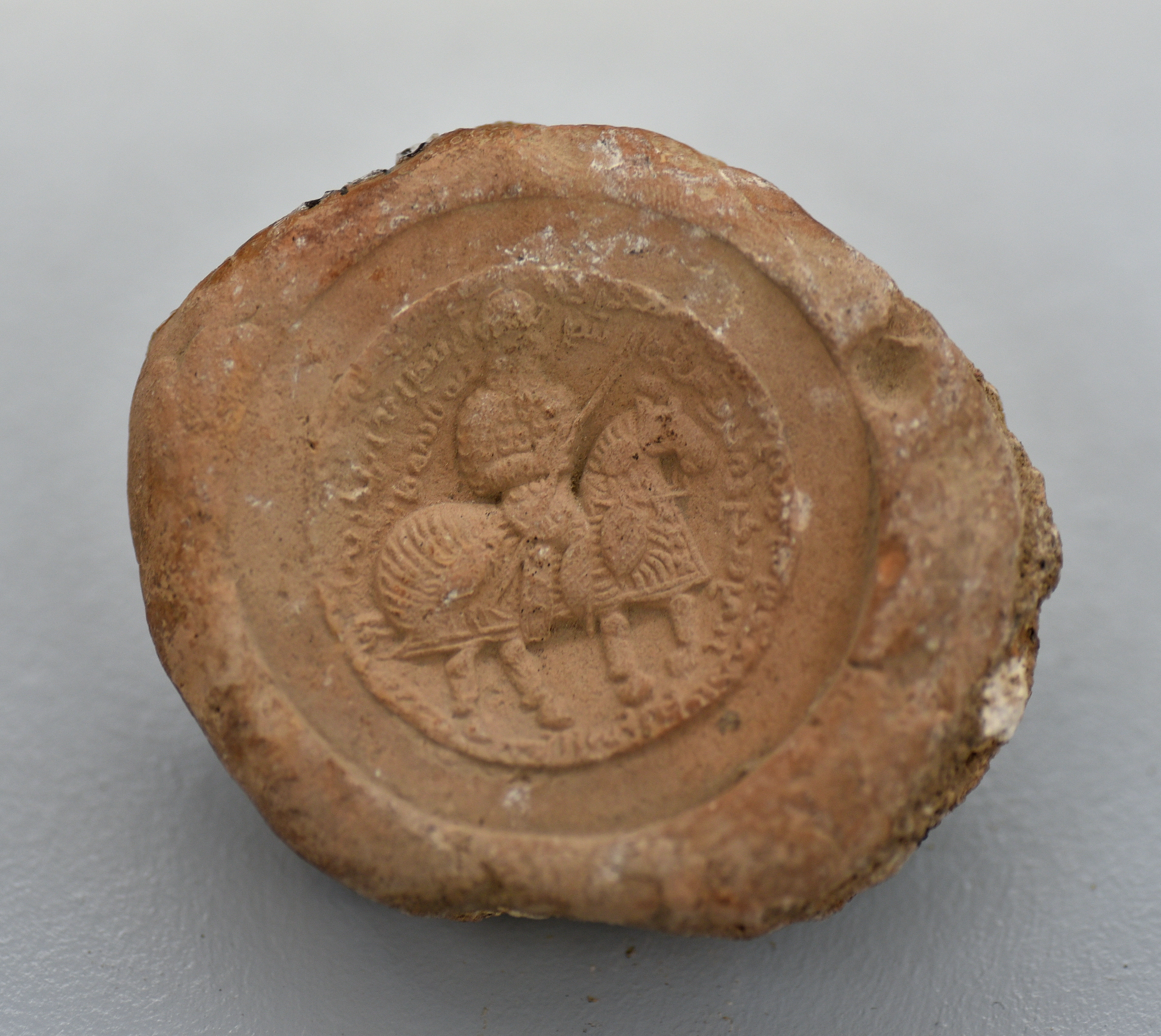
A bulla (seal) of Wahrām, an Ērān-spāhbed. It mentions either Husraw I (r. 531–579) or II (591–626).

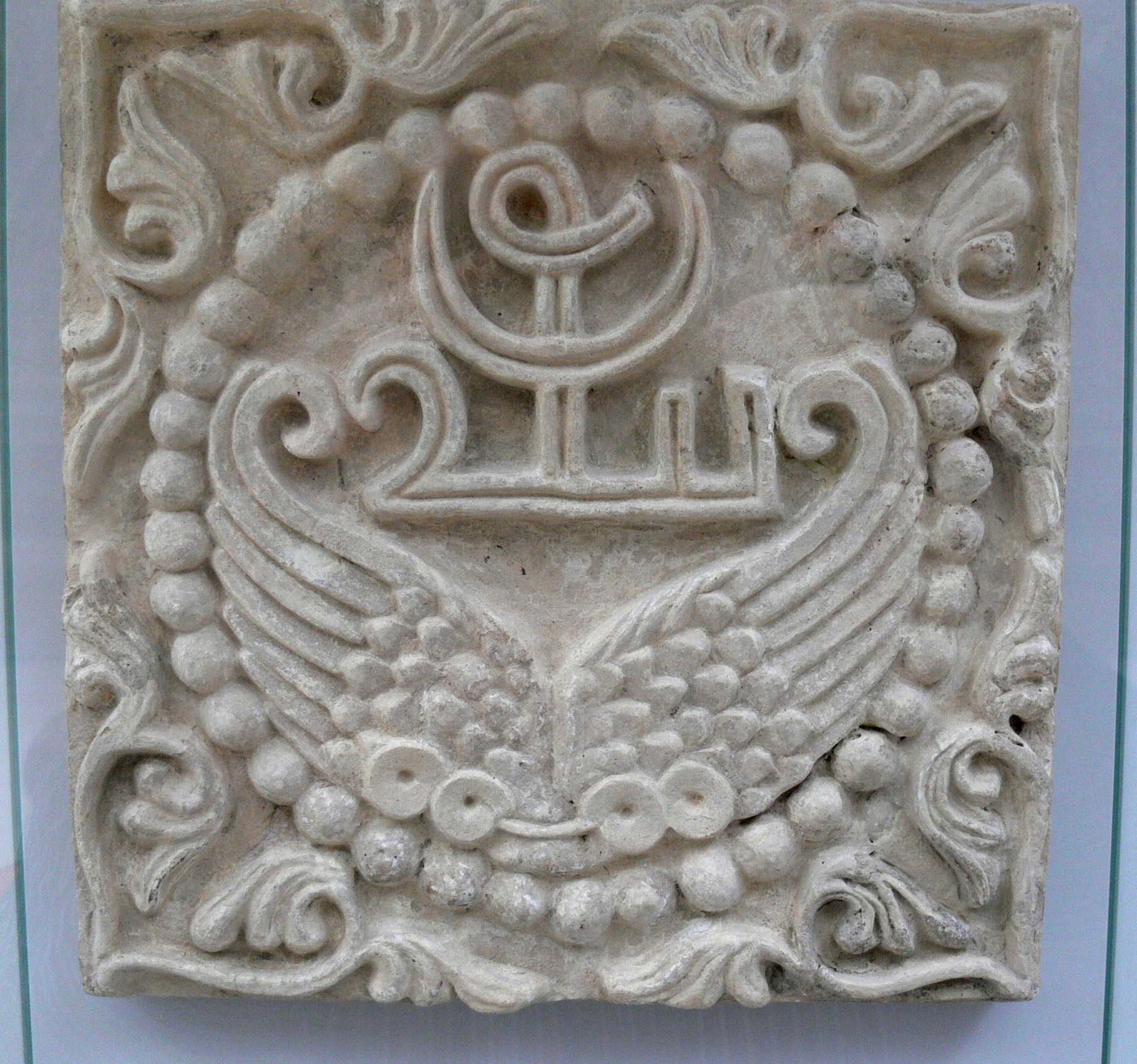
6th/7th century relief with the monogram ʼpr, (Note: 𐭠𐭯𐭥) which stands for afzūn farr (See Khvarenah).

=== Psalter Pahlavi ===
Psalter Pahlavi derives its name from the so-called "Pahlavi Psalter", a 6th- or 7th-century translation of a Syriac book of psalms. This text, which was found at Bulayiq near Turpan in northwest China, is the earliest evidence of literary composition in Pahlavi, dating to the 6th or 7th century AD. The extant manuscript dates no earlier than the mid-6th century since the translation reflects liturgical additions to the Syriac original by Mar Aba I, who was Patriarch of the Church of the East c. 540–552. Its use is peculiar to Christians in Iran, given its use in a fragmentary manuscript of the Psalms of David.

The script of the psalms has altogether 18 graphemes, 5 more than Book Pahlavi and one less than Inscriptional Pahlavi. As in Book Pahlavi, letters are connected to each other. The only other surviving source of Psalter Pahlavi is the inscriptions on a bronze processional cross found at Herat, in present-day Afghanistan. Due to the dearth of comparable material, some words and phrases in both sources remain undeciphered.

Of the 18 characters, 9 connect in all four traditional abjad positions, while 9 connect only on their right or are isolated. Numbers are built from units of 1, 2, 3, 4, 10, 20, and 100. The numbers 10 and 20 join on both sides, but the numbers 1, 2, 3, and 4 only join on the right, and if they are followed by an additional digit, they lose their tail, which is visually evident in their isolated forms. There are 12 encoded punctuation characters, and many are similar to those found in Syriac. The section marks are written in half-red and half-black, and several documents have entire sections in both black and red, as a means of distinction.

=== Book Pahlavi ===
Book Pahlavi is a smoother script in which letters are joined to each other and often form complicated ligatures. Book Pahlavi was the most common form of the script, with only 13 graphemes representing 24 sounds. The formal coalescence of originally different letters caused ambiguity, and the letters became even less distinct when they formed part of a ligature. In its later forms, attempts were made to improve the consonantary and reduce ambiguity through diacritic marks.

Book Pahlavi continued to be in common use until about AD 900. After that date, Pahlavi was preserved only by the Zoroastrian clergy.

The word Ērān-šahr, spelled ʼylʼnštr^{|} 'land of the Aryans', in Book Pahlavi.

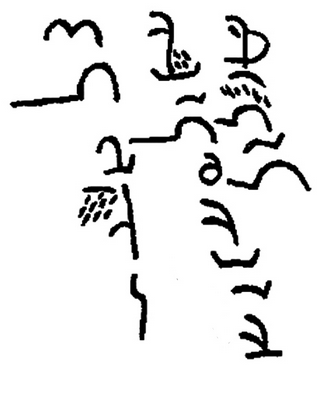
Tracing of a mid-6th century Sasanian inscription from the northern city wall of Darband. It is written in a cursive (top-to-bottom, left-to-right) script close to that of Book Pahlavi, but with some forms typical of Inscriptional Pahlavi inscriptions. (Note: dly[w]š ZY / [ʾt]wr[p]ʾtkʾn / ʾm[ʾ]lkl Dari[u]š ī / [Ād]ur[b]ādagān / ām[ā]rgar 'Dariuš, āmārgar [chief fiscal officer] of Ādurbādagān' (in inscriptional Pahlavi: 𐭣𐭫𐭩[𐭥]𐭱 𐭦𐭩 \ [𐭠𐭲]𐭥𐭥[𐭯]𐭠𐭲𐭪𐭠𐭭 \ 𐭠𐭬[𐭠]𐭫𐭪𐭫 ).)

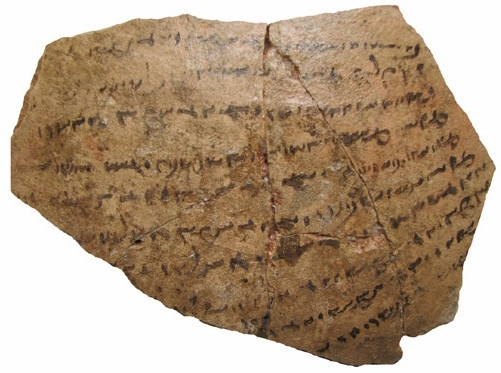
Late Sasanian ostracon with Book Pahlavi writing. Found at Qaleh Iraj in Varamin.

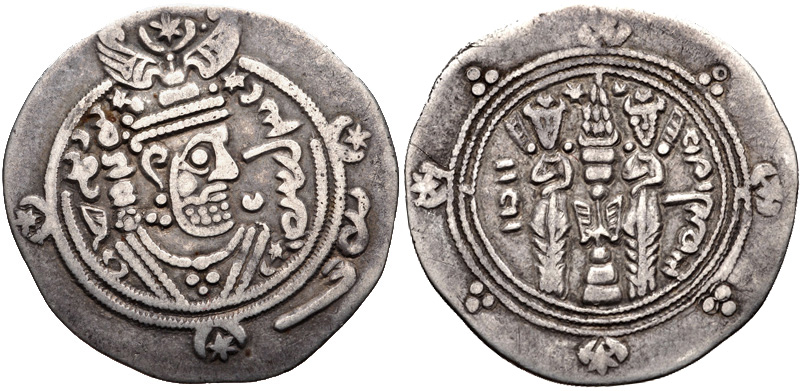
Coin of Khurshīd, Ispahbad of Tabaristan (r. 740–760).

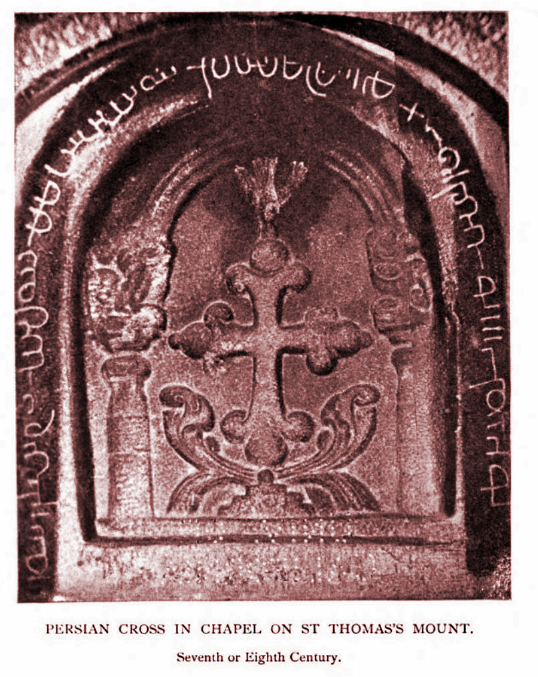
7th or 8th century Saint Thomas stone cross at St Thomas mount, Chennai, Tamil Nadu, India.

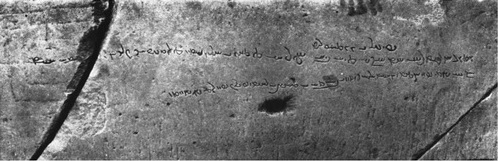
New Persian tomb inscription of Khurdād in Constantinople, 8th to 10th century.

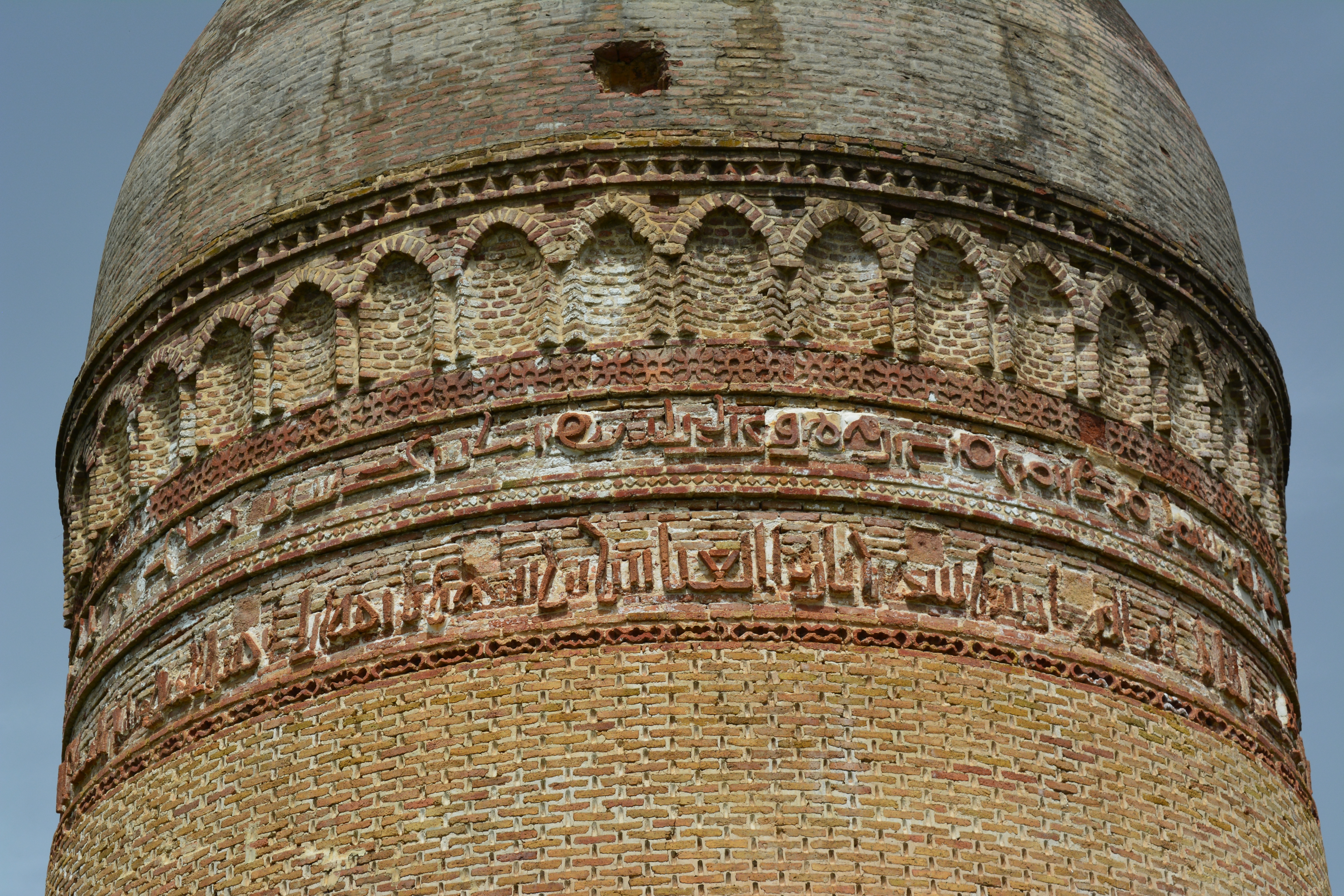
A tomb tower in Lajim, dated 1022/23, with its upper Middle Persian inscription in a script derived from Book Pahlavi.

=== Logograms ===
In both Inscriptional and Book Pahlavi, many common words, including even pronouns, particles, numerals, and auxiliaries, were spelled according to their Aramaic equivalents, which were used as logograms. For example, the word for "dog" was written as ⟨KLBʾ⟩ (Aramaic kalbā) but pronounced sag; and the word for "bread" would be written as Aramaic ⟨LḤMʾ⟩ (laḥmā) but understood as the sign for Iranian nān. These words were known as huzwārišn. Such a logogram could also be followed by letters expressing parts of the Persian word phonetically, e.g. ⟨ʾB-tr⟩ for pidar "father". The grammatical endings were usually written phonetically. A logogram did not necessarily originate from the lexical form of the word in Aramaic, it could also come from a declined or conjugated Aramaic form. For example, tō "you" (singular) was spelt ⟨LK⟩ (Aramaic "to you", including the preposition l-). A word could be written phonetically even when a logogram for it existed (pidar could be ⟨ʼB-tr⟩ or ⟨pytr⟩), but logograms were nevertheless used very frequently in texts.

Many huzwārišn are listed in the lexicon Frahang ī Pahlavīg. The practice of using these logograms appears to have originated from the use of Aramaic in the chancelleries of the Achaemenid Empire. Partly similar phenomena are found in the use of Sumerograms and Akkadograms in ancient Mesopotamia and the Hittite empire, and in the adaptation of Chinese writing to Japanese.

=== Problems in reading Book Pahlavi ===
As pointed out above, the convergence in the form of many of the characters of Book Pahlavi causes a high degree of ambiguity in most Pahlavi writing, and it needs to be resolved by the context. Some mergers are restricted to particular groups of words or individual spellings. Further ambiguity is added by the fact that even outside of ligatures, the boundaries between letters are not clear, and many letters look identical to combinations of other letters. As an example, one may take the fact that the name of God, Ohrmazd, could equally be read (and, by Parsis, often was read) Anhoma. Historically speaking, it was spelt ⟨ʼwhrmzd⟩, a fairly straightforward spelling for an abjad. However, ⟨w⟩ had coalesced with ⟨n⟩; ⟨r⟩ had coalesced, in the spelling of certain words, with both ⟨n⟩ and ⟨w⟩; and ⟨z⟩ had been reduced, in the spelling of certain words, to a form whose combination with ⟨d⟩ was indistinguishable from a ⟨ʼ⟩, which in turn had coalesced with ⟨h⟩. This meant that the same orthographic form that stood for ⟨ʼwhrmzd⟩ could also be interpreted as ⟨ʼnhwmh⟩ (among many other possible readings). The logograms could also pose problems. For this reason, important religious texts were sometimes transcribed into the phonetically unambiguous Avestan alphabet. This latter system is called Pazand.

== Literary dialects ==
From a formal historical and linguistic point of view, the Pahlavi script does not have a one-to-one correspondence with any Middle Iranian language: none was written in Pahlavi exclusively, and inversely, the Pahlavi script was used for more than one language. Still, the vast majority of surviving Pahlavi texts are in Middle Persian, hence the occasional use of the term "Pahlavi" to refer to that language.

=== Arsacid Pahlavi ===
Following the overthrow of the Seleucids, the Parthian Arsacids—who considered themselves the legitimate heirs of the Achaemenids—adopted the manner, customs, and government of the Persian court of two centuries previously. Among the many practices so adopted was the use of the Aramaic language ("Imperial Aramaic") that together with Aramaic script served as the language of the chancellery. By the end of the Arsacid era, the written Aramaic words had come to be understood as logograms, as explained above.

The use of Pahlavi gained popularity following its adoption as the language/script of the commentaries (Zand) on the Avesta. Propagated by the priesthood, who were not only considered to be transmitters of all knowledge but were also instrumental in government, the use of Pahlavi eventually reached all corners of the Parthian Arsacid empire.

Arsacid Pahlavi is also called Parthian Pahlavi (or just Parthian), Chaldeo-Pahlavi, or Northwest Pahlavi, the latter reflecting its apparent development from a dialect that was almost identical to that of the Medes.

=== Sasanian Pahlavi ===
Following the defeat of the Parthian Arsacids by the Persian Sasanians (Sassanids), the latter inherited the empire and its institutions, and with it the use of the Aramaic-derived language and script. Like the Parthians before him, Ardašēr, the founder of the Sasanian empire, projected himself as a successor to the regnal traditions of the first, in particular those of Artaxerxes II, whose throne name the new emperor adopted.

From a linguistic point of view, there was probably only a little disruption. Since the Sasanians had inherited the bureaucracy, in the beginning, the affairs of government continued as before, with the use of dictionaries such as the Frahang ī Pahlavīg assisting the transition. More importantly, being both Western Middle Iranian languages, Parthian was closely related to the dialect of the southwest (which was more properly called Pārsīg, that is, the language of Pārsā, Persia proper).

Arsacid Pahlavi did not die out with the Arsacids. It is represented in some bilingual inscriptions alongside the Sasanian Pahlavi; by the parchment manuscripts of Auroman; and by certain Manichaean texts from Turpan. Furthermore, the archaic orthography of Sasanian Pahlavi continued to reflect, in many respects, pronunciations that had been used in Arsacid times (in Parthia as well as Fars) and not its contemporary pronunciation.

Sasanian Pahlavi is also called Sassanid Pahlavi, Persian Pahlavi, or Southwest Pahlavi.

It is between 1787 and 1791 that Antoine Isaac Silvestre de Sacy deciphered the Pahlavi inscriptions of the Sassanid kings.

=== Post-conquest Pahlavi ===
Following the Islamic conquest of the Sassanids, the term Pahlavi came to refer to the (written) "language" of the southwest (i.e., Pārsi). How this came to pass remains unclear, but it has been assumed that this was simply because it was the dialect that the conquerors would have been most familiar with.

As the language and script of religious and semi-religious commentaries, Pahlavi remained in use long after that language had been superseded (in general use) by Modern Persian and Arabic script had been adopted as the means to render it. As late as the 17th century, Zoroastrian priests in Iran admonished their Indian co-religionists to learn it.

Post-conquest Pahlavi (or just Pahlavi) is also called Zoroastrian Pahlavi or Zoroastrian Middle Persian.

== Letters ==
Name	Inscriptional Parthian	Inscriptional Pahlavi	Psalter Pahlavi
Aleph	𐭀	𐭠	𐮀
Beth	𐭁	𐭡	𐮁
Gimel	𐭂	𐭢	𐮂
Daleth	𐭃	𐭣	𐮃
He	𐭄	𐭤	𐮄
Waw	𐭅	𐭥	𐮅
Zayin	𐭆	𐭦	𐮆
Heth	𐭇	𐭧	𐮇
Teth	𐭈	𐭨	
Yodh	𐭉	𐭩	𐮈
Kaph	𐭊	𐭪	𐮉
Lamedh	𐭋	𐭫	𐮊
Mem	𐭌	𐭬	𐮋
Nun	𐭍	𐭭	𐮌
Samekh	𐭎	𐭮	𐮍
Ayin	𐭏	𐭥	𐮅
Pe	𐭐	𐭯	𐮎
Sadhe	𐭑	𐭰	𐮏
Qoph	𐭒	𐭬	𐮋
Resh	𐭓	𐭥	𐮅
Shin	𐭔	𐭱	𐮐
Taw	𐭕	𐭲	𐮑

=== Numbers ===
Value		1	2	3	4	10	20	100	1000
Sign	Inscriptional Parthian	𐭘	𐭙	𐭚	𐭛	𐭜	𐭝	𐭞	𐭟
Sign	Inscriptional Pahlavi	𐭸	𐭹	𐭺	𐭻	𐭼	𐭽	𐭾	𐭿
Sign	Psalter Pahlavi	𐮩	𐮪	𐮫	𐮬	𐮭	𐮮	𐮯	

== Unicode ==
Tables showing the letters and their names or pronunciations are available online.

Inscriptional Pahlavi and Inscriptional Parthian were added to the Unicode Standard in October 2009 with the release of version 5.2. Psalter Pahlavi was added in June 2014 with the release of version 7.0. There have been four main proposals for encoding Book Pahlavi, but as of March 2026 it remains unsupported by Unicode.

The Unicode block for Inscriptional Pahlavi is U+10B60–U+10B7F:

Inscriptional Pahlavi^{[1]}^{[2]} Official Unicode Consortium code chart (PDF)
	0	1	2	3	4	5	6	7	8	9	A	B	C	D	E	F
U+10B6x	𐭠	𐭡	𐭢	𐭣	𐭤	𐭥	𐭦	𐭧	𐭨	𐭩	𐭪	𐭫	𐭬	𐭭	𐭮	𐭯
U+10B7x	𐭰	𐭱	𐭲						𐭸	𐭹	𐭺	𐭻	𐭼	𐭽	𐭾	𐭿
Notes 1.As of Unicode version 18.0 2.Grey areas indicate non-assigned code points

The Unicode block for Inscriptional Parthian is U+10B40–U+10B5F:

Inscriptional Parthian^{[1]}^{[2]} Official Unicode Consortium code chart (PDF)
	0	1	2	3	4	5	6	7	8	9	A	B	C	D	E	F
U+10B4x	𐭀	𐭁	𐭂	𐭃	𐭄	𐭅	𐭆	𐭇	𐭈	𐭉	𐭊	𐭋	𐭌	𐭍	𐭎	𐭏
U+10B5x	𐭐	𐭑	𐭒	𐭓	𐭔	𐭕			𐭘	𐭙	𐭚	𐭛	𐭜	𐭝	𐭞	𐭟
Notes 1.As of Unicode version 18.0 2.Grey areas indicate non-assigned code points

The Unicode block for Psalter Pahlavi is U+10B80–U+10BAF:

Psalter Pahlavi^{[1]}^{[2]} Official Unicode Consortium code chart (PDF)
	0	1	2	3	4	5	6	7	8	9	A	B	C	D	E	F
U+10B8x	𐮀	𐮁	𐮂	𐮃	𐮄	𐮅	𐮆	𐮇	𐮈	𐮉	𐮊	𐮋	𐮌	𐮍	𐮎	𐮏
U+10B9x	𐮐	𐮑								𐮙	𐮚	𐮛	𐮜			
U+10BAx										𐮩	𐮪	𐮫	𐮬	𐮭	𐮮	𐮯
Notes 1.As of Unicode version 18.0 2.Grey areas indicate non-assigned code points

== See also ==
- Imperial Aramaic
- Middle Iranian languages
- Manichaean alphabet

== Bibliography ==
- Andreas, Friedrich Carl (1910), "Bruchstücke einer Pehlewi-Übersetzung der Psalmen aus der Sassanidenzeit", Sitzungsberichte der Königlich Preussischen Akademie der Wissenschaft, Philosophisch-historische Klasse. (in German), XLI (4), Berlin: PAW: 869–72
- ——— (2002), "The Parthians", in Godrej, Pheroza J. (ed.), A Zoroastrian Tapestry, New York: Mapin
- Boyce, Mary (1990), Textual Sources for the Study of Zoroastrianism, Chicago: UC Press
- Dhabar, Bamanji Nusserwanji (1932), The Persian Rivayats of Hormazyar Framarz and others, Bombay: K. R. Cama Oriental Institute
- Dhalla, Maneckji Nusservanji (1922), Zoroastrian Civilization, New York: OUP
- Henning, Walter B. (1958), Altiranisch. Handbuch der Orientalistik. Erste Abteilung (in German), vol. Band IV: Iranistik. Erster Abschnitt. Linguistik, Leiden-Köln: Brill
- Geiger, Wilhelm; Kuhn, Ernst, eds. (2002), Grundriss der iranischen Philologie, vol. I.1, Boston: Adamant
- Gignoux, Philippe (2002), "Pahlavi Psalter", Encyclopedia Iranica, Costa Mesa: Mazda, archived from the original on 2009-02-27
- Kent, Roland G. (1950), Old Persian: Grammar, texts, lexicon, New Haven: American Oriental Society
- MacKenzie, D. N. (1971), A Concise Pahlavi Dictionary, London: Curzon Press
- Mirza, Hormazdyar Kayoji (2002), "Literary treasures of the Zoroastrian priests", in Godrej, Pheroza J. (ed.), A Zoroastrian Tapestry, New York: Mapin, pp. 162–163
- Nyberg, Henrik Samuel (1974), A Manual of Pahlavi, vol. Part II: Glossary, Wiesbaden: Otto Harrassowitz
- Menachery, Prof. George (2005), "Pahlavi Crosses of Kerala in Granite Objects in Kerala Churches", Glimpses of Nazraney Heritage, Ollur: SARAS – South Asia Research Assistance Services
- Weber, Dieter (1992), "Texts I: Ostraca, Papyri und Pergamente", Corpus Inscriptionum Iranicarum. Part III: Pahlavi Inscriptions, vol. IV. Ostraca, V. Papyri, London: SOAS
- West, Edward William (1904), "Pahlavi literature", in Geiger, Wilhelm; Kuhn, Ernst (eds.), Grundriss der iranischen Philologie II, Stuttgart: Trübner
