= Frahang-i Pahlavig =

Anonymous dictionary of mostly Aramaic logograms with Middle Persian translations

Frahang-ī Pahlavīg (Middle Persian: 𐭯𐭥𐭧𐭭𐭢 𐭯𐭧𐭫𐭥𐭩𐭪, lit. 'Pahlavi dictionary'; Persian: فرهنگ پهلوی) is the title of an anonymous dictionary of mostly Aramaic logograms with Middle Persian translations (in Pahlavi script) and transliterations (in Pazend script). Its date is unknown.

The glossary was previously known to Indian Zoroastrians, called the Parsis, as the mna-xvatay (traditionally pronounced mona khoda), a name derived from the first two words (the lemma) of the first entry.

== Relevant scripts' characteristics ==
The Pazend script has the following characteristics, as contrasted with the Pahlavi script:

- Pazend is a variant of the Avestan alphabet (Din dabireh), a phonetic alphabet. In contrast, Pahlavi is only an abjad.
- Pazend does not have ideograms. In contrast, ideograms are an identifying feature of the Pahlavi system, and are words borrowed from Semitic languages such as Aramaic that continue to be spelled as in Aramaic transliterated into the Pahlavi script, yet are pronounced as the corresponding word in Persian.

== Manuscripts and interpretations ==
The oldest surviving example of a Frahang-like text is a one-page fragment discovered at Turpan that is believed to date to the 9th or 10th century CE. Several more complete manuscripts exist in Bombay, Oxford, Paris, and Copenhagen, but the oldest of these dates to the 15th century and is missing a second folio and all of folio 28 onwards. In the earliest edition made available to European scholarship, the Frahang is arranged serially; that is, according to the shape of the Aramaic characters. That edition, obtained by Abraham Anquetil-Duperron in the mid-18th century, is today in the Bibliothèque nationale, Paris. In 1867, Hoshangji Jamaspji Asa and Martin Haug published a transcript of a manuscript that was arranged thematically by chapter.

The existence of similar glossaries from Akkadian times (explaining Sumerian logograms) led an Assyriologist, Erich Ebeling, to explain that many of the words in the Frahang were derived from Sumerian or Akkadian. This led to a number of "far-fetched interpretations," which were then subsequently incorporated into a number of later interpretations, including those of Iranists, so effectively making even these unreliable.

== Structure and content ==
The glossary encompasses approximately five hundred (not counting variations) Semitic language heterograms (huzwārišn, "probably mean[ing] 'obsoleteness, antiquity, or archaism'"), "in the form used by Zoroastrians in writing Middle Persian (Book Pahlavi), each explained by a "phonetic" writing of the corresponding Persian word." Besides heterograms of Aramaic origin, the Frahang also has a handful of pseudo-heterograms from "Arabic words coined by later scribes" and "scattered examples of historical spellings of Iranian words, no longer recognized as such." Altogether about 1300 words (including word forms) are represented, "but its original extent appears to have been only 1000 words, excluding the appendices." Several heterograms are not attested in any other text.

While the one-page Turpan fragment lists various forms for verbs followed by one Middle Persian translation (in the infinitive), other manuscripts list at most three verb forms, but then provide Middle Persian equivalents of each. The primary elements (logogram(s) and translation) "are then transcribed interlinearly, and more or less corruptly, into Avestan letters, i.e., into Pāzand, whereby the heterograms appear in their traditional mnemonic pronunciation. Because of the ambiguity of the Pahlavi script this is often far removed from the original Aramaic spellings." In the manuscript examined by Asa and Haug, the huzwārišn and translations are in black, and the Pazend transliterations are in red (the first chapter is an exception, and is entirely in black).

Substituting Latin characters (and written left-to-right) for Pahlavi and Pazend ones (which are written right-to-left), Frahang glosses look like this:

huzvarishn heterogram (Aramaic alphabet, RtL)	MP translation (Latin transliteration)	Aramaic word behind the logogram (in the Frahang rendered in Pazend)	English meaning
^{:= KLB}	sag	kalba	"dog"
^{:= MLK}	shāh	malka	"king"
^{:= LḤM}	nān	laḥma	"bread"

Thus, "king" would be written but understood in Iran to be the sign for 'shāh'.

In the Asa and Haug manuscript, the Frahang is organized thematically, divided into (approximately) thirty chapters. Eighteen of these chapters have titles (listed below in italics), the others do not. West ends his description at chapter 23 as "no further chapters are indicated." The last section/chapter is a collection of older Iranian language words (and variant spellings), with more modern words explaining the older terms.

1.	In the name of the Creator Ohrmazd
2.	worldly things
3.	waters
4.	grains, fruits
5.	drinking
6.	vegetables
7.	quadrupeds
8.	birds
9.	animals
10.	parts of the body

11.	details (of the family?)
12.	superiors
13.	inferiors
14.	riding
15.	writing
16.	metals
17.	assignments
18.	verbs 1
19.	verbs 2
20.	verbs 3

21.	verbs 4
22.	the end of praise "(?, verbs of being and dying)"
23.	written correspondence
24.	pronouns
25.	(mostly) adverbs
26.	adjectives
27.	divisions of the year
28.	names of days and months
29.	numerals
30.	spelling variants
