= Logogram =

Grapheme which represents a word or a morpheme

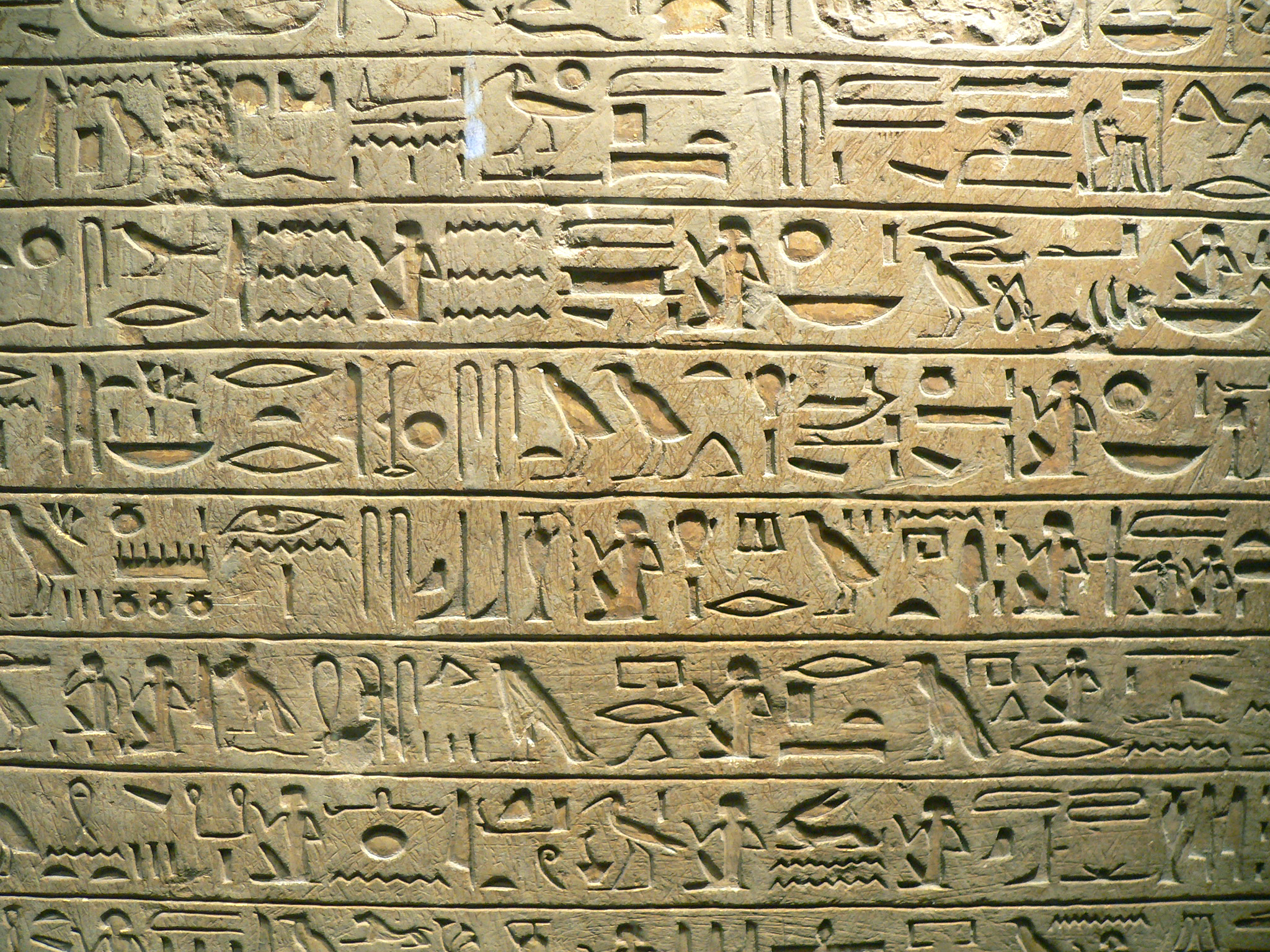
Egyptian hieroglyphs, including logograms such as the sun disk (⊙, visible several times here)

In a written language, a logogram (from Ancient Greek logos 'word', and gramma 'that which is drawn or written'), also logograph or lexigraph, is a written character that represents a semantic component of a language, such as a word or morpheme. Chinese characters as used in Chinese as well as other languages are logograms, as are Egyptian hieroglyphs and characters in cuneiform script. A writing system that primarily uses logograms is called a logography. Non-logographic writing systems, such as alphabets and syllabaries, are phonemic: their individual symbols represent sounds directly and lack any inherent meaning. However, all known logographies have some phonetic component, generally based on the rebus principle, and the addition of a phonetic component to pure ideographs is considered to be a key innovation in enabling the writing system to adequately encode human language.

== Types of logographic systems ==
Some of the earliest recorded writing systems are logographic; the first historical civilizations of Mesopotamia, Egypt, China and Mesoamerica all used some form of logographic writing.

All logographic scripts ever used for natural languages rely on the rebus principle to extend a relatively limited set of logograms: A subset of characters is used for their phonetic values, either consonantal or syllabic. The term logosyllabary is used to emphasize the partially phonetic nature of these scripts when the phonetic domain is the syllable. In Ancient Egyptian hieroglyphs, Ch'olti', and in Chinese, there has been the additional development of determinatives, which are combined with logograms to narrow down their possible meaning. In Chinese, they are fused with logographic elements used phonetically; such "radical and phonetic" characters make up the bulk of the script. Ancient Egyptian and Chinese relegated the active use of rebus to the spelling of foreign and dialectical words.

=== Logoconsonantal ===
Logoconsonantal scripts have graphemes that may be extended phonetically according to the consonants of the words they represent, ignoring the vowels. For example, Egyptian

G38

was used to write both sȝ 'duck' and sȝ 'son', though it is likely that these words were not pronounced the same except for their consonants. The primary examples of logoconsonantal scripts are Egyptian hieroglyphs, hieratic, and demotic: Ancient Egyptian.

=== Logosyllabic ===
Logosyllabic (or morphosyllabic) scripts have graphemes which represent morphemes, often polysyllabic morphemes, but when extended phonetically represent single syllables. They include cuneiform, Anatolian hieroglyphs, Cretan hieroglyphs, Linear A and Linear B, Chinese characters, Maya script, Aztec script, Mixtec script, and the first five phases of the Bamum script.

=== Others ===
A peculiar system of logograms developed within the Pahlavi scripts (developed from the abjad of Aramaic) used to write Middle Persian during much of the Sassanid period; the logograms were composed of letters that spelled out the word in Aramaic but were pronounced as in Persian (for instance, the combination m-l-k would be pronounced "shah"). These logograms, called hozwārishn (a form of heterograms), were dispensed with altogether after the Arab conquest of Persia and the adoption of a variant of the Arabic alphabet.

== Semantic and phonetic dimensions ==
All historical logographic systems include a phonetic dimension, as it is impractical to have a separate basic character for every word or morpheme in a language. (Note: Most have glyphs with predominantly syllabic values, called logosyllabic, though Egyptian had predominantly consonantal or poly-consonantal values, and is thus called logoconsonantal.) In some cases, such as cuneiform as it was used for Akkadian, the vast majority of glyphs are used for their sound values rather than logographically. Many logographic systems also have a semantic/ideographic component (see ideogram), called "determinatives" in the case of Egyptian and "radicals" in the case of Chinese. (Note: "Determinative" is the more generic term, however, and some authors use it for Chinese as well (e.g. William Boltz, in Daniels and Bright, 1996, p. 194).)

Typical Egyptian usage was to augment a logogram, which may potentially represent several words with different pronunciations, with a determinate to narrow down the meaning, and a phonetic component to specify the pronunciation. In the case of Chinese, the vast majority of characters are a fixed combination of a radical that indicates its nominal category, plus a phonetic to give an idea of the pronunciation. The Mayan system used logograms with phonetic complements like the Egyptian, while lacking ideographic components.

== Universal logograms ==
Not all logograms are associated with one specific language, and some are not associated with any language at all. The ampersand is a logogram in the Latin script, a combination of the letters "e" and "t." In Latin, "et" translates to "and," and the ampersand is still used to represent this word today, however, it does so in a variety of languages, being a representative of morphemes "and," "y," or "en," if they are a speaker of English, Spanish, or Dutch, respectively.

Outside of any script is Unicode, a compilation of characters of various meanings. They state their intention to build the standard to include every character from every language. It's the generally accepted standard for computer character encoding, but others, like ASCII and Baudot, exist and serve various purposes in digital communication. Many logograms in these databases are ubiquitous, and are used on the Internet by users worldwide.

== Chinese characters ==
Chinese scholars have traditionally classified Chinese characters into six types by etymology.

The first two types are "single-body", meaning that the character was created independently of other characters. "Single-body" pictograms and ideograms make up only a small proportion of Chinese logograms. More productive for the Chinese script were the two "compound" methods, i.e. the character was created from assembling different characters. Despite being called "compounds", these logograms are still single characters, and are written to take up the same amount of space as any other logogram. The final two types are methods in the usage of characters rather than the formation of characters themselves.

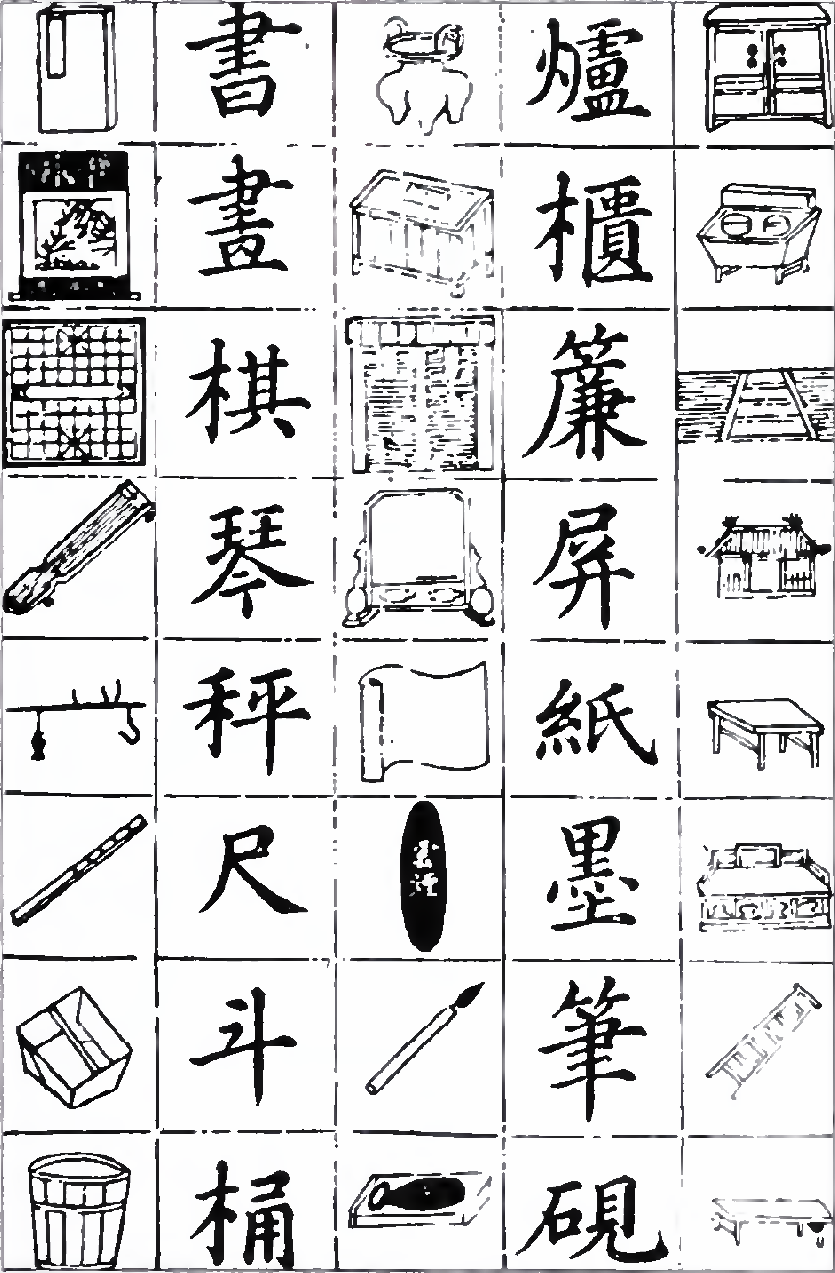
Page from Newly Compiled Four Character Dictionary (新編對相四言), a 1436 Ming Dynasty primer on Chinese characters.

1. The first type, and the type most often associated with Chinese writing, are pictograms, which are pictorial representations of the morpheme represented, e.g. 山 for 'mountain'.
2. The second type are the ideograms that attempt to visualize abstract concepts, such as 上 'up' and 下 'down'. Also considered ideograms are pictograms with an ideographic indicator; for instance, 刀 is a pictogram meaning 'knife', while 刃 is an ideogram meaning 'blade'.
3. Radical–radical compounds, in which each element of the character (called radical) hints at the meaning. For example, 休 'rest' is composed of the characters for 'person' (人) and 'tree' (木), with the intended idea of someone leaning against a tree, i.e. resting.
4. Radical–phonetic compounds, in which one component (the radical) indicates the general meaning of the character, and the other (the phonetic) hints at the pronunciation. An example is 樑 (liáng), where the phonetic 梁 liáng indicates the pronunciation of the character and the radical 木 ('wood') indicates its meaning of 'supporting beam'. Characters of this type constitute around 90% of Chinese logograms.
5. Changed-annotation characters are characters which were originally the same character but have bifurcated through orthographic and often semantic drift. For instance, 樂 / 乐 can mean both 'music' (yuè) and 'pleasure' (lè).
6. Improvisational characters (lit. 'improvised-borrowed-words') come into use when a native spoken word has no corresponding character, and hence another character with the same or a similar sound (and often a close meaning) is "borrowed"; occasionally, the new meaning can supplant the old meaning. For example, 自 used to be a pictographic word meaning 'nose', but was borrowed to mean 'self', and is now used almost exclusively to mean the latter; the original meaning survives only in stock phrases and more archaic compounds. Because of their derivational process, the entire set of Japanese kana can be considered to be of this type of character, hence the name kana (lit. 'borrowed names'). Example: Japanese 仮名; 仮 is a simplified form of Chinese 假 used in Korea and Japan, and 假借 is the Chinese name for this type of characters.

The most productive method of Chinese writing, the radical-phonetic, was made possible by ignoring certain distinctions in the phonetic system of syllables. In Old Chinese, post-final ending consonants /s/ and /ʔ/ were typically ignored; these developed into tones in Middle Chinese, which were likewise ignored when new characters were created. Also ignored were differences in aspiration (between aspirated vs. unaspirated obstruents, and voiced vs. unvoiced sonorants); the Old Chinese difference between type-A and type-B syllables (often described as presence vs. absence of palatalization or pharyngealization); and sometimes, voicing of initial obstruents and/or the presence of a medial /r/ after the initial consonant. In earlier times, greater phonetic freedom was generally allowed. During Middle Chinese times, newly created characters tended to match pronunciation exactly, other than the tone – often by using as the phonetic component a character that itself is a radical-phonetic compound.

Due to the long period of language evolution, such component "hints" within characters as provided by the radical-phonetic compounds are sometimes useless and may be misleading in modern usage. As an example, based on 每 'each', pronounced měi in Standard Mandarin, are the characters 侮 'to humiliate', 悔 'to regret', and 海 'sea', pronounced respectively wǔ, huǐ, and hǎi in Mandarin. Three of these characters were pronounced very similarly in Old Chinese – /mˤəʔ/ (每), /m̥ˤəʔ/ (悔), and /m̥ˤəʔ/ (海) according to a recent reconstruction by William H. Baxter and Laurent Sagart – but sound changes in the intervening 3,000 years or so (including two different dialectal developments, in the case of the last two characters) have resulted in radically different pronunciations.

=== Chinese characters used in Japanese and Korean ===
Within the context of the Chinese language, Chinese characters (known as hanzi) by and large represent words and morphemes rather than pure ideas; however, the adoption of Chinese characters by the Japanese and Korean languages (where they are known as kanji and hanja, respectively) have resulted in some complications to this picture.

Many Chinese words, composed of Chinese morphemes, were borrowed into Japanese and Korean together with their character representations; in this case, the morphemes and characters were borrowed together. In other cases, however, characters were borrowed to represent native Japanese and Korean morphemes, on the basis of meaning alone. As a result, a single character can end up representing multiple morphemes of similar meaning but with different origins across several languages. Because of this, kanji and hanja are sometimes described as morphographic writing systems.

=== Differences in processing of logographic and phonologic writing systems ===
Because much research on language processing has centered on English and other alphabetically written languages, many theories of language processing have stressed the role of phonology in producing speech. Contrasting logographically coded languages, where a single character is represented phonetically and ideographically, with phonetically/phonemically spelled languages has yielded insights into how different languages rely on different processing mechanisms. Studies on the processing of logographically coded languages have amongst other things looked at neurobiological differences in processing, with one area of particular interest being hemispheric lateralization. Since logographically coded languages are more closely associated with images than alphabetically coded languages, several researchers have hypothesized that right-side activation should be more prominent in logographically coded languages. Although some studies have yielded results consistent with this hypothesis there are too many contrasting results to make any final conclusions about the role of hemispheric lateralization in orthographically versus phonetically coded languages.

Another topic that has been given some attention is differences in processing of homophones. Verdonschot et al. examined differences in the time it took to read a homophone out loud when a picture that was either related or unrelated to a homophonic character was presented before the character. Both Japanese and Chinese homophones were examined. Whereas word production of alphabetically coded languages (such as English) has shown a relatively robust immunity to the effect of context stimuli, Verdschot et al. found that Japanese homophones seem particularly sensitive to these types of effects. Specifically, reaction times were shorter when participants were presented with a phonologically related picture before being asked to read a target character out loud. An example of a phonologically related stimulus from the study would be for instance when participants were presented with a picture of an elephant, which is pronounced zou in Japanese, before being presented with the Chinese character 造, which is also read zou. No effect of phonologically related context pictures were found for the reaction times for reading Chinese words. A comparison of the (partially) logographically coded languages Japanese and Chinese is interesting because whereas the Japanese language consists of more than 60% homographic heterophones (characters that can be read two or more different ways), most Chinese characters only have one reading. Because both languages are logographically coded, the difference in latency in reading aloud Japanese and Chinese due to context effects cannot be ascribed to the logographic nature of the writing systems. Instead, the authors hypothesize that the difference in latency times is due to additional processing costs in Japanese, where the reader cannot rely solely on a direct orthography-to-phonology route, but information on a lexical-syntactical level must also be accessed in order to choose the correct pronunciation. This hypothesis is confirmed by studies finding that Japanese Alzheimer's disease patients whose comprehension of characters had deteriorated still could read the words out loud with no particular difficulty.

Studies contrasting the processing of English and Chinese homophones in lexical decision tasks have found an advantage for homophone processing in Chinese, and a disadvantage for processing homophones in English. The processing disadvantage in English is usually described in terms of the relative lack of homophones in the English language. When a homophonic word is encountered, the phonological representation of that word is first activated. However, since this is an ambiguous stimulus, a matching at the orthographic/lexical ("mental dictionary") level is necessary before the stimulus can be disambiguated, and the correct pronunciation can be chosen. In contrast, in a language (such as Chinese) where many characters with the same reading exists, it is hypothesized that the person reading the character will be more familiar with homophones, and that this familiarity will aid the processing of the character, and the subsequent selection of the correct pronunciation, leading to shorter reaction times when attending to the stimulus. In an attempt to better understand homophony effects on processing, Hino et al. conducted a series of experiments using Japanese as their target language. While controlling for familiarity, they found a processing advantage for homophones over non-homophones in Japanese, similar to what has previously been found in Chinese. The researchers also tested whether orthographically similar homophones would yield a disadvantage in processing, as has been the case with English homophones, but found no evidence for this. It is evident that there is a difference in how homophones are processed in logographically coded and alphabetically coded languages, but whether the advantage for processing of homophones in the logographically coded languages Japanese and Chinese (i.e. their writing systems) is due to the logographic nature of the scripts, or if it merely reflects an advantage for languages with more homophones regardless of script nature, remains to be seen.

== Advantages and disadvantages ==
=== Separating writing and pronunciation ===
The main difference between logograms and other writing systems is that the graphemes are not linked directly to their pronunciation. An advantage of this separation is that understanding of the pronunciation or language of the writer is unnecessary, e.g. 1 is understood regardless of whether it be called one, ichi or wāḥid by its reader. Likewise, people speaking different varieties of Chinese may not understand each other in speaking, but may do so to a significant extent in writing even if they do not write in Standard Chinese. Therefore, in China, Vietnam, Korea, and Japan before modern times, communication by writing (筆談) was the norm of East Asian international trade and diplomacy using Classical Chinese.

This separation, however, also has the great disadvantage of requiring the memorization of the logograms when learning to read and write, separately from the pronunciation. Though not from an inherent feature of logograms but due to its unique history of development, Japanese has the added complication that almost every logogram has more than one pronunciation. Conversely, a phonetic character set is written precisely as it is spoken, but with the disadvantage that slight pronunciation differences introduce ambiguities. Many alphabetic systems such as those of Greek, Latin, Italian, Spanish, and Finnish make the practical compromise of standardizing how words are written while maintaining a nearly one-to-one relation between characters and sounds. Orthographies in some other languages, such as English, French, Thai and Tibetan, are all more complicated than that; character combinations are often pronounced in multiple ways, usually depending on their history. Hangul, the Korean language's writing system, is an example of an alphabetic script that was designed to replace the logogrammatic hanja in order to increase literacy. The latter is now rarely used, but retains some currency in South Korea, sometimes in combination with hangul.

According to government-commissioned research, the most commonly used 3,500 characters listed in the People's Republic of China's "Chart of Common Characters of Modern Chinese" (现代汉语常用字表, Xiàndài Hànyǔ Chángyòngzì Biǎo) cover 99.48% of a two-million-word sample. As for the case of traditional Chinese characters, 4,808 characters are listed in the "Chart of Standard Forms of Common National Characters" (常用國字標準字體表) by the Ministry of Education of the Republic of China, while 4,759 in the "List of Graphemes of Commonly-Used Chinese Characters" (常用字字形表) by the Education and Manpower Bureau of Hong Kong, both of which are intended to be taught during elementary and junior secondary education. Education after elementary school includes not as many new characters as new words, which are mostly combinations of two or more already learned characters.

=== Characters in information technology ===
Entering complex characters can be cumbersome on electronic devices due to a practical limitation in the number of input keys. There exist various input methods for entering logograms, either by breaking them up into their constituent parts such as with the Cangjie and Wubi methods of typing Chinese, or using phonetic systems such as Bopomofo or Pinyin where the word is entered as pronounced and then selected from a list of logograms matching it. While the former method is (linearly) faster, it is more difficult to learn. With the Chinese alphabet system however, the strokes forming the logogram are typed as they are normally written, and the corresponding logogram is then entered.

Also due to the number of glyphs, in programming and computing in general, more memory is needed to store each grapheme, as the character set is larger. As a comparison, ISO 8859 requires only one byte for each grapheme, while the Basic Multilingual Plane encoded in UTF-8 requires up to three bytes. On the other hand, English words, for example, average five characters and a space per word and thus need six bytes for every word. Since many logograms contain more than one grapheme, it is not clear which is more memory-efficient. Variable-width encodings allow a unified character encoding standard such as Unicode to use only the bytes necessary to represent a character, reducing the overhead that results merging large character sets with smaller ones.

== See also ==
- Phonogram
- Dongba symbols
- Emoji
- Logo
- Symbol
- Syllabogram
- Wingdings
- Rebus, the use of pictures to represent words or parts of words
- Sitelen Pona, a constructed logography
