= Pazend =

Middle Persian writing system

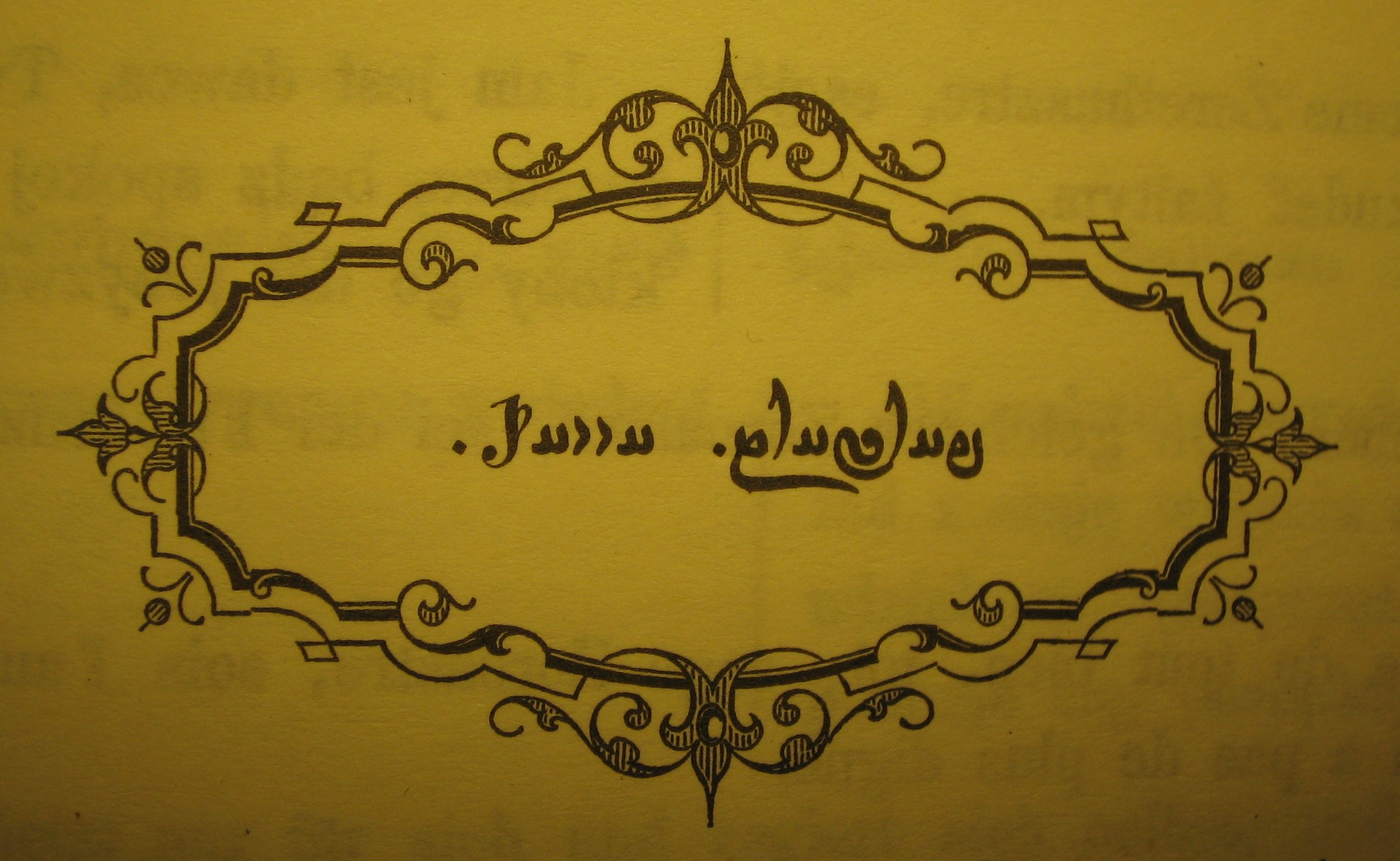
- Script type: Alphabet
- Period: Until 9th century
- Direction: Right-to-left script
- Languages: Middle Persian

Related scripts
- Parent systems: Egyptian hieroglyphs: Proto-Sinaitic; Phoenician alphabet; Aramaic alphabet; Pahlavi script; Avestan alphabet; Pazend

Pazend (/pəˈzɛnd/) or Pazand (Middle Persian: 𐭯𐭠𐭰𐭭𐭣; Avestan: 𐬞𐬀𐬌𐬙𐬌 𐬰𐬀𐬌𐬥𐬙𐬌) is one of the writing systems used for the Middle Persian language. It was based on the Avestan alphabet, a phonetic alphabet originally used to write Avestan, the language of the Avesta, the primary sacred texts of Zoroastrianism.

Pazend's principal use was for writing the commentaries (Zend) on and/or translations of the Avesta. The word "Pazend" ultimately derives from the Avestan words paiti zainti, which can be translated as either "for commentary purposes" or "according to understanding" (phonetically).

Pazend had the following characteristics, both of which are to be contrasted with Pahlavi, which is one of the other systems used to write Middle Persian:

- Pazend was a variant of the Avestan alphabet (Din dabireh), which was a phonetic alphabet. In contrast, Pahlavi script was only an abjad.
- Pazend did not have ideograms. In contrast, ideograms were an identifying feature of the Pahlavi system, and these huzvarishn were words borrowed from Semitic languages such as Aramaic that continued to be spelled as in Aramaic (in Pahlavi script) but were pronounced as the corresponding word in Persian.

In combination with its religious purpose, these features constituted a "sanctification" of written Middle Persian. The use of the Avestan alphabet to write Middle Persian required the addition of one symbol to the Avestan alphabet: This character, to represent the /l/ phoneme of Middle Persian, had not previously been needed.

Following the fall of the Sassanids, after which Zoroastrianism came to be supplanted by Islam, Pazend lost its purpose and soon ceased to be used for original composition. In the late 11th or early 12th century, Indian Zoroastrians (the Parsis) began translating Avestan or Middle Persian texts into Sanskrit and Gujarati. Some Middle Persian texts were also transcribed into the Avestan alphabet. The latter process, being a form of interpretation, was known as 'pa-zand'. "Pazand texts, transcribed phonetically, represent a late and often corrupt Middle Persian pronunciation, and so present their own problems." "The corruptions during this process are sometimes considerable." Among the transcribed texts are the prefaces (dibacheh) to prayers in Avestan. These prefatory prayers are invariably written in Pazend because of the need for "accurate" pronunciation. This practice has led to the misconception that "Pazend" is the name of a language.

Following Abraham Hyacinthe Anquetil-Duperron's translation of some of the texts of the Avesta in the late 18th century, the term "Zend-Avesta" was mistakenly used to refer to the sacred texts themselves (as opposed to commentaries on them). This usage subsequently led to the equally mistaken use of "Pazend" for the Avestan script as such and "Zend" for the Avestan language.

== Bibliography ==
- Dhalla, Maneckji Nusservanji (1938), History of Zoroastrianism, New York: OUP
