= Heterogram (linguistics) =

Representation of foreign words in logogram writing systems

Heterogram (classical compound: "different" + "written") is a term used mostly in the philology of Akkadian and Pahlavi texts containing borrowings from Sumerian and Aramaic respectively. It refers to a special type of logogram or ideogram borrowed from another language (in which it may have been either ideographic or phonetic) to represent either a sound or meaning in the matrix language. It is now commonly accepted that they do not represent true borrowings from the embedded language and instead came to represent a separate register of orthographic archaisms.

As an example in English, the written abbreviations e.g., i.e., and viz. are sometimes read respectively as "for example", "that is", and "namely". When read this way, the abbreviations for the Latin phrases exempli gratia, id est, and videlicet are being used logographically to indicate English phrases which are rough translations. Similarly, the ampersand ⟨&⟩, originally a ligature for the Latin word et, in many European languages stands logographically for the local word for "and" regardless of pronunciation. This can be contrasted with the older way of abbreviating et cetera, namely &c., where ⟨&⟩ is used to represent et as a full loanword, not a heterogram. In Japanese, the initialism JSDF is a heterogram, as it's commonly pronounced "Jieitai" but written as JSDF in Latin letters.

Heterograms are frequent in cuneiform scripts, such as the Akkadian cuneiform, which uses Sumerian heterograms, or the Anatolian cuneiform, which uses both Sumerian and Akkadian heterograms. In Middle Iranian scripts derived from the Aramaic scripts (such as the Pahlavi scripts), all logograms are heterograms coming from Aramaic. Sometimes such heterograms are referred to by terms identifying the source language such as "Sumerograms" or "Aramaeograms". Another example is kanji in Japanese, literally "Sinograms" or "Han characters".

== See also ==
- Logogram
- Kun'yomi
- Rebus Principle
- Frahang-i Pahlavig
- Pangram
