= Avestan alphabet =

Alphabet used mainly to write Avestan, the language of the Zoroastrian scripture Avesta

Avestan
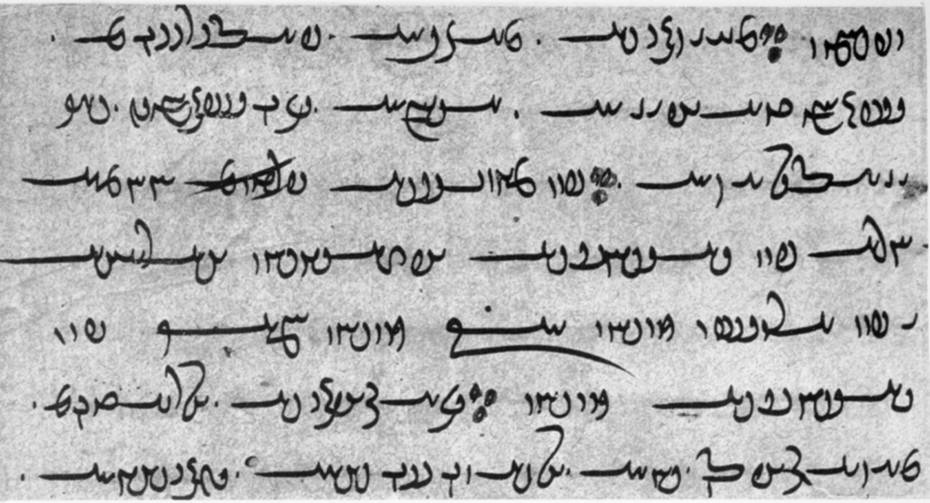
- Script type: Alphabet
- Period: 400–1000 AD
- Direction: Right-to-left script
- Languages: Avestan language, Middle Persian

Related scripts
- Parent systems: Egyptian hieroglyphs: Proto-Sinaitic; Phoenician alphabet; Aramaic alphabet; Pahlavi script; Avestan

ISO 15924
- ISO 15924: Avst (134), Avestan

Unicode
- Unicode alias: Avestan
- Unicode range: U+10B00–U+10B3F

The Avestan alphabet (Avestan: 𐬛𐬍𐬥 𐬛𐬀𐬠𐬌𐬭𐬫𐬵 transliteration: dīn dabiryªh, Middle Persian: transliteration: dyn' dpywryh, transcription: dēn dibīrīh, Persian: دین‌دبیره, romanized: din dabire) is a writing system developed during Iran's Sasanian era (226–651 CE) to render the Avestan language.

As a side effect of its development, the script was also used for Pazend, a method of writing Middle Persian that was used primarily for Zend commentaries on the texts of the Avesta. In the texts of Zoroastrian tradition, the alphabet is referred to as "the religion's script" (dēn dibīrīh in Middle Persian and din dabireh in New Persian).

== History ==
The development of the Avestan alphabet was initiated by the need to represent recited Avestan language texts correctly. The various text collections that today constitute the canon of Zoroastrian scripture are the result of a collation that occurred in the 4th century, probably during the reign of Shapur II (309–379). It is likely that the Avestan alphabet was an ad hoc innovation related to this—"Sassanid archetype"—collation.

The enterprise, "which is indicative of a Mazdean revival and of the establishment of a strict orthodoxy closely connected with the political power, was probably caused by the desire to compete more effectively with Buddhists, Christians, and Manicheans, whose faith was based on a revealed book". In contrast, the Zoroastrian priesthood had for centuries been accustomed to memorizing scripture—following by rote the words of a teacher-priest until they had memorized the words, cadence, inflection and intonation of the prayers. This they passed on to their pupils in turn, so preserving for many generations the correct way to recite scripture. This was necessary because the priesthood considered (and continue to consider) precise and correct enunciation and cadence a prerequisite of effective prayer. Further, the recitation of the liturgy was (and is) accompanied by ritual activity that leaves no room to attend to a written text.

The ability to correctly render Avestan did, however, have a direct benefit: By the common era, the Avestan language words had almost ceased to be understood, which led to the preparation of the Zend texts (from Avestan zainti "understanding"), commentaries on and translations of the canon. The development of the Avestan alphabet allowed these commentaries to interleave quotation of scripture with explanation thereof. The direct effect of these texts was a "standardized" interpretation of scripture that survives to the present day. For scholarship these texts are enormously interesting, since they occasionally preserve passages that have otherwise been lost.

The 9th–12th century texts of Zoroastrian tradition suggest that there was once a much larger collection of written Zoroastrian literature, but these texts—if they ever existed—have since been lost, and it is hence not known what script was used to render them. The question of the existence of a pre-Sassanid "Arsacid archetype" occupied Avestan scholars for much of the 19th century, and, "[w]hatever may be the truth about the Arsacid Avesta, the linguistic evidence shows that even if it did exist, it can not have had any practical influence, since no linguistic form in the Vulgate can be explained with certainty as resulting from wrong transcription and the number of doubtful cases is minimal; in fact it is being steadily reduced. Though the existence of an Arsacid archetype is not impossible, it has proved to contribute nothing to Avestan philology."

== Genealogy and script ==
The Pahlavi script, whereupon the Avestan alphabet is based, was in common use for representing various Middle Iranian languages, but was not adequate for representing a religious language that demanded precision since the Pahlavi script was a simplified abjad syllabary with at most 22 symbols, some of which were ambiguous (i.e. could represent more than one sound).

In contrast, Avestan was a full alphabet, with explicit characters for vowels, and allowed for phonetic disambiguation of allophones. The alphabet includes many characters closely resembling Book Pahlavi of the early Islamic Persia—𐬀 (a), 𐬌 (i), 𐬐 (k), 𐬙 (t), 𐬞 (p), 𐬠 (b), 𐬨 (m), 𐬥 (n), 𐬭 (r), 𐬯 (s), 𐬰 (z), 𐬱 (š), 𐬓 (xᵛ)—while some—𐬁 (ā), 𐬖 (γ)—are characters that only exist in the older (6th–7th c. AD) Psalter Pahlavi script (in later Book Pahlavi γ and k are written with the same letter). Some of the vowels, such as 𐬆 (ə), appear to derive from Greek cursives. Avestan 𐬊 (o) is a special form of Pahlavi 𐮊 (l) that exists only in Aramaic signs. Some letters—𐬣 (ŋ́), 𐬧 (ṇ), 𐬪 (ẏ), 𐬬 (v)—are free inventions.

Avestan, like Pahlavi and Aramaic, is written from right to left. Letters are not connected, and ligatures are "rare and clearly of secondary origin".

== Letters ==
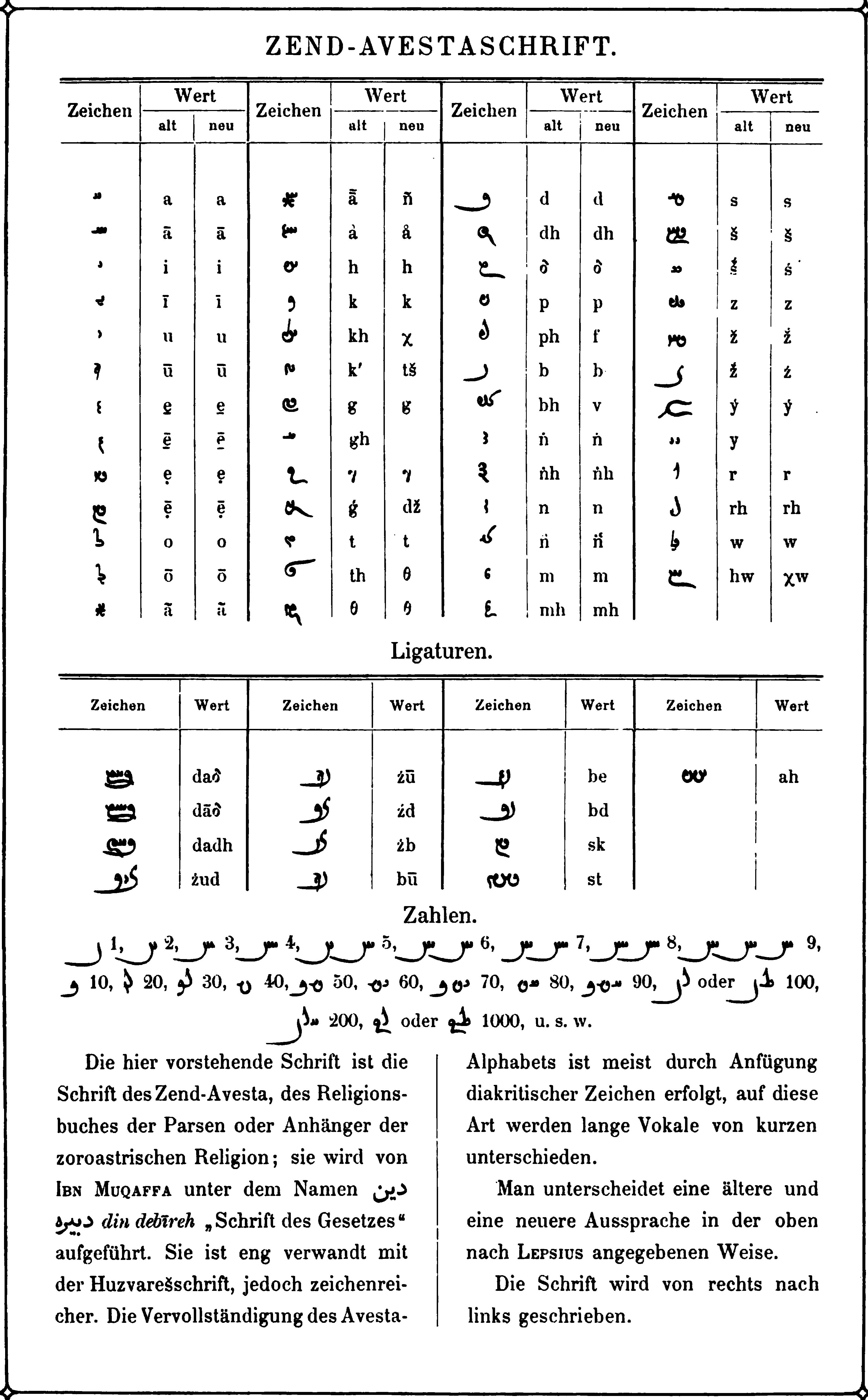
Avestan chart by Carl Faulmann

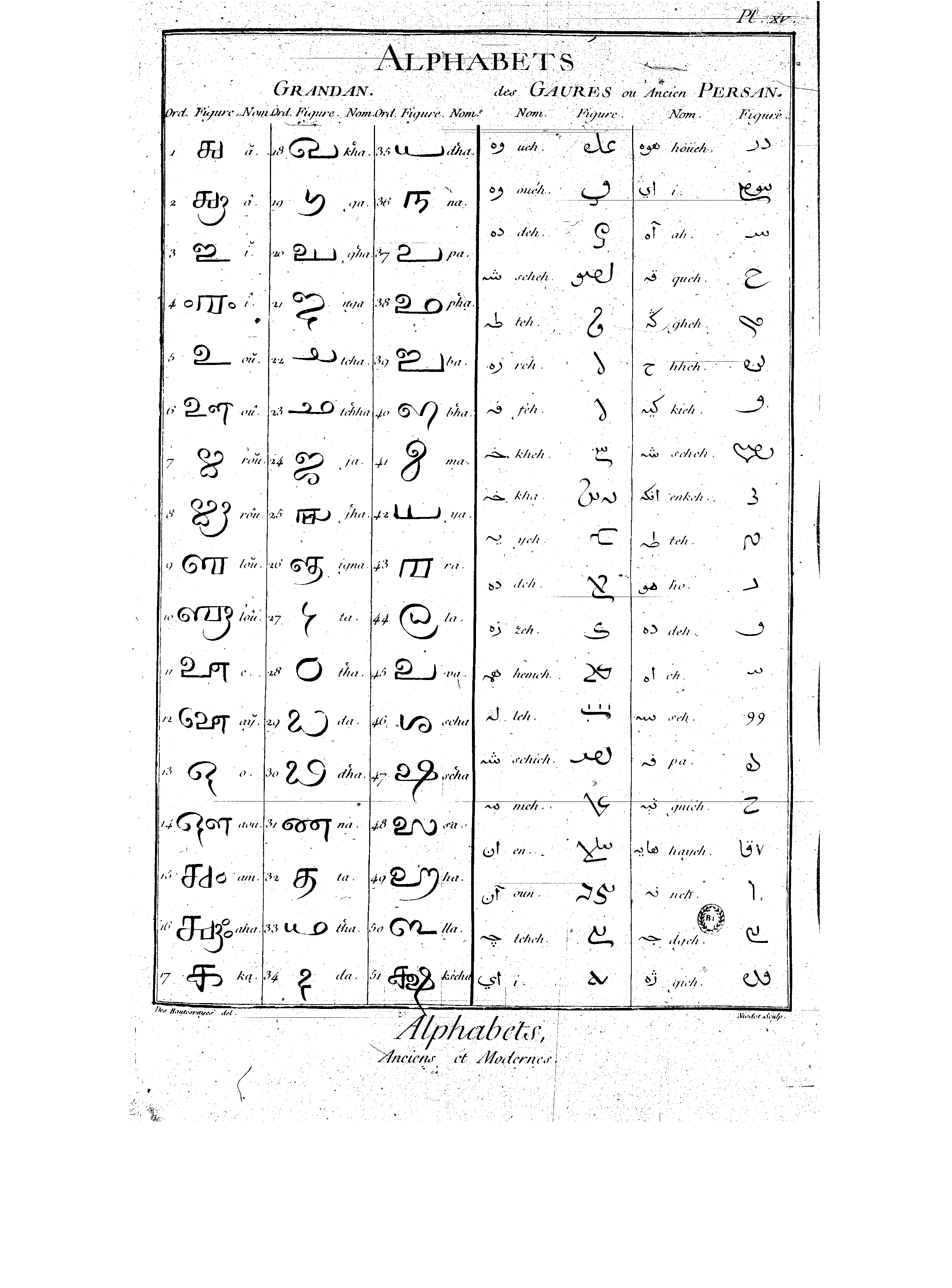
Avestan chart on p. 183 of vol. 2 of Diderot's Encyclopédie

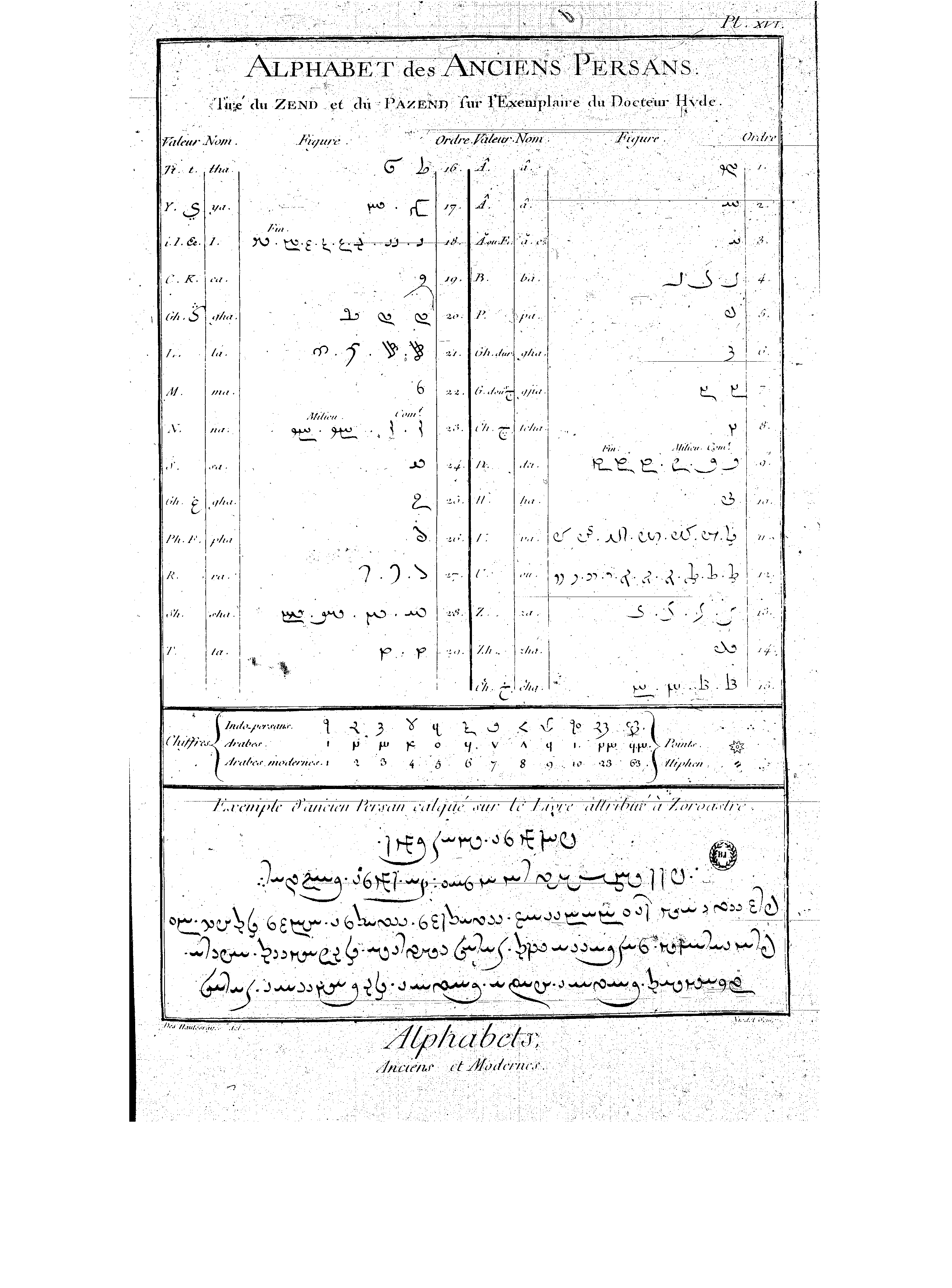
Avestan chart on p. 184 of l'Encyclopédie

In total, the Avestan alphabet has 37 consonants and 16 vowels. There are two main transcription schemes for Avestan, the newer orthography used by Karl Hoffmann and the older one used by Christian Bartholomae.

Avestan alphabet
Letter	Transcription			IPA
Letter	Gippert	Hoffmann	Bartholomae	IPA
𐬀	a			/a/
𐬁	ā			/aː/
𐬂	å		—	/ɒ/
𐬃	ā̊		å	/ɒː/
𐬄	ą			/ã/
𐬅	ą̇, ą̄	ą̇	—	/ãː/
𐬆	ə			/ə/
𐬇	ə̄			/əː/
𐬈	e			/e/
𐬉	ē			/eː/
𐬊	o			/ɔ/
𐬋	ō			/oː/
𐬌	i			/ɪ/
𐬍	ī			/iː/
𐬎	u			/ʊ/
𐬏	ū			/uː/
𐬐	k			/k/
𐬑	x			/x/
𐬒	x́		ḣ	/xʲ/, /ç/
𐬓	xᵛ			/xʷ/
𐬔	g			/ɡ/
𐬕	ġ		—	/ɡʲ/, /ɟ/
𐬖	γ			/ɣ/
𐬗	c		č	/t͡ʃ/
𐬘	j		ǰ	/d͡ʒ/
𐬙	t			/t/
𐬚	θ	ϑ		/θ/
𐬛	d			/d/
𐬜	δ, δ́	δ		/ð/
𐬝	t̰			/t̚/
𐬞	p			/p/
𐬟	f			/f/
𐬠	b			/b/
𐬡	β		w	/β/
𐬢	ŋ			/ŋ/
𐬣	ŋ́			/ŋʲ/
𐬤	ŋᵘ	ŋᵛ	—	/ŋʷ/
𐬥	n			/n/
𐬦	ń, ṅ	ń	—	/ɲ/
𐬧	ṇ		n, m	/?/
𐬨	m			/m/
𐬩	m̨		—	/m̥/
𐬪	ẏ		y	/j/
𐬫	y		y	/j/
𐬌𐬌	ii		y	/ii̯/
𐬬	v, v̇	v	v	/w/
𐬎𐬎	uu		v	/uu̯/
𐬭	r			/r/
𐬮	l	—		/l/
𐬯	s			/s/
𐬰	z			/z/
𐬱	š		š	/ʃ/
𐬳	š́		š	/ɕ/
𐬴	ṣ̌		š	/ʂ/
𐬲	ž			/ʒ/
𐬵	h, h́	h		/h/
Letter	Gippert	Hoffmann	Bartholomae	IPA
Letter	Transcription			IPA

Later, when writing Middle Persian in the script (i.e. Pazend), another consonant 𐬮 (l) was added to represent the */l/ phoneme that did not exist in the Avestan language (Proto-Indo-European *l in Avestan merged with /r/ in all positions).

== Ligatures ==
List of Avestan ligatures according to Skjærvø (2003)

Four ligatures are commonly used in Avestan manuscripts:

- 𐬱‌𐬀 (š-a) → 𐬱𐬀 (ša)
- 𐬱‌𐬗 (š-c) → 𐬱𐬗 (šc)
- 𐬱‌𐬙 (š-t) → 𐬱𐬙 (št)
- 𐬀‌𐬵 (a-h) → 𐬀𐬵 (ah)

Fossey lists 16 ligatures, but most are formed by the interaction of swash tails.

In Unicode, U+200C ZERO WIDTH NON-JOINER can be placed between letters to prevent ligatures being formed.

== Numerals ==
Numerals are in the Faulmann chart (see picture), near the bottom.

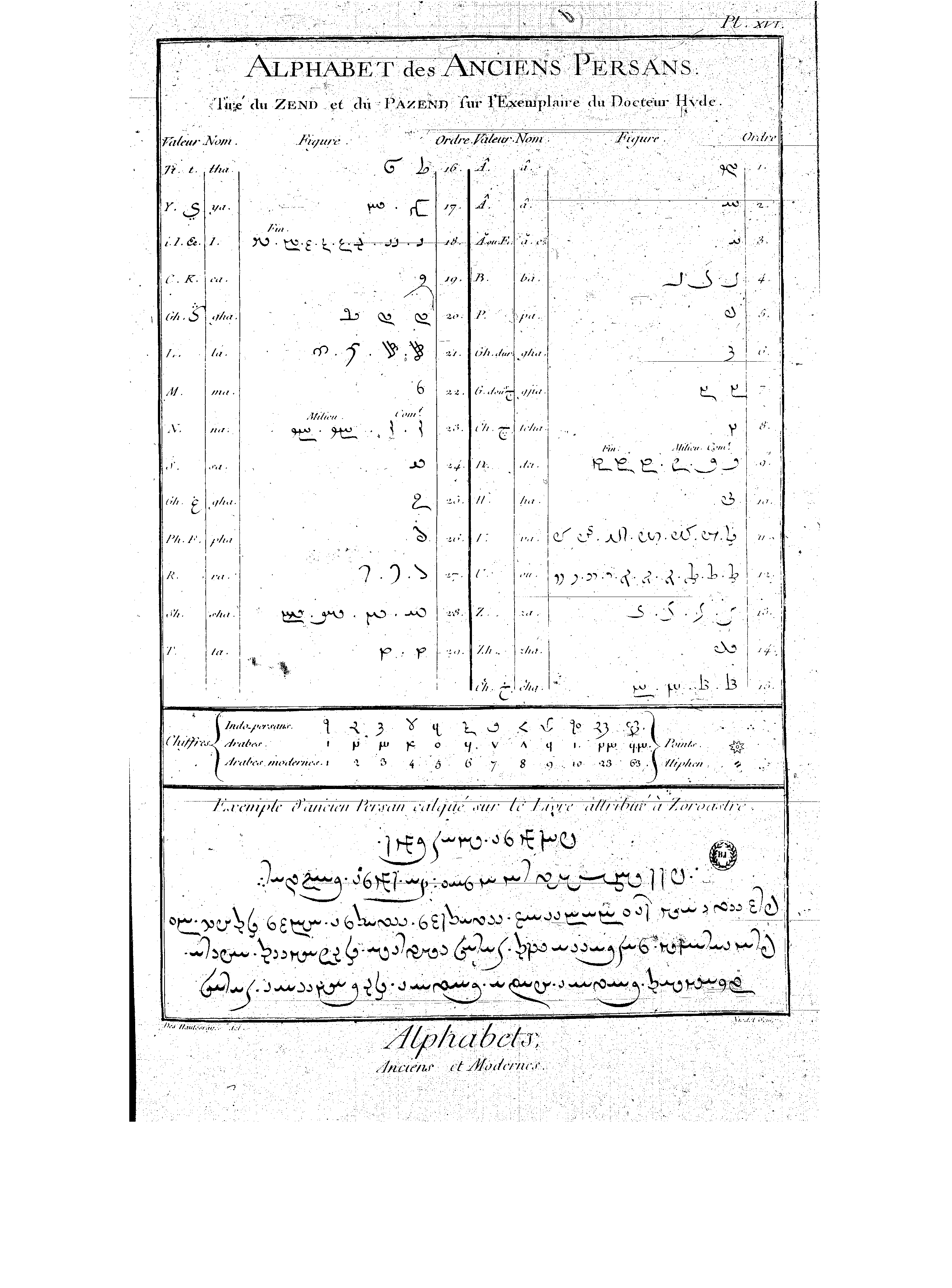

== Punctuation ==
Words and the end of the first part of a compound are separated by a dot (in a variety of vertical positions). Beyond that, punctuation is weak or non-existent in the manuscripts, and in the 1880s Karl Friedrich Geldner had to devise one for standardized transcription. In his system, which he developed based on what he could find, a triangle of three dots serves as a colon, a semicolon, an end of sentence or end of section; which is determined by the size of the dots and whether there is one dot above and two below, or two above and one below. Two above and one below signify—in ascending order of "dot" size—colon, semicolon, end of sentence or end of section.

Avestan punctuation
Mark	Function	Unicode
⸱	word separator	U+2E31: WORD SEPARATOR MIDDLE DOT
·	word separator	U+00B7: MIDDLE DOT
.	word separator	U+002E: FULL STOP
𐬹	abbreviation or repetition	U+10B39: AVESTAN ABBREVIATION MARK
𐬺	colon	U+10B3A: TINY TWO DOTS OVER ONE DOT PUNCTUATION
𐬻	semicolon	U+10B3B: SMALL TWO DOTS OVER ONE DOT PUNCTUATION
𐬼	end of sentence	U+10B3C: LARGE TWO DOTS OVER ONE DOT PUNCTUATION
𐬽	alternative mark for end of sentence (found in Avestan texts but not used by Geldner)	U+10B3D: LARGE ONE DOT OVER TWO DOTS PUNCTUATION
𐬾	end of section (may be doubled for extra finality)	U+10B3E: LARGE TWO RINGS OVER ONE RING PUNCTUATION
𐬿	alternative mark for end of section (found in Avestan texts but not used by Geldner)	U+10B3F: LARGE ONE RING OVER TWO RINGS PUNCTUATION

== Unicode ==
The Avestan alphabet was added to the Unicode Standard in October 2009 with the release of version 5.2.

The characters are encoded at U+10B00—10B35 for letters, with 𐬌𐬌 (ii) and 𐬎𐬎 (uu) represented as sequences of characters,) and U+10B38—10B3F for punctuation.

Avestan^{[1]}^{[2]} Official Unicode Consortium code chart (PDF)
	0	1	2	3	4	5	6	7	8	9	A	B	C	D	E	F
U+10B0x	𐬀	𐬁	𐬂	𐬃	𐬄	𐬅	𐬆	𐬇	𐬈	𐬉	𐬊	𐬋	𐬌	𐬍	𐬎	𐬏
U+10B1x	𐬐	𐬑	𐬒	𐬓	𐬔	𐬕	𐬖	𐬗	𐬘	𐬙	𐬚	𐬛	𐬜	𐬝	𐬞	𐬟
U+10B2x	𐬠	𐬡	𐬢	𐬣	𐬤	𐬥	𐬦	𐬧	𐬨	𐬩	𐬪	𐬫	𐬬	𐬭	𐬮	𐬯
U+10B3x	𐬰	𐬱	𐬲	𐬳	𐬴	𐬵				𐬹	𐬺	𐬻	𐬼	𐬽	𐬾	𐬿
Notes 1.As of Unicode version 18.0 2.Grey areas indicate non-assigned code points

== Bibliography ==
- Dhalla, Maneckji Nusservanji (1938), History of Zoroastrianism, New York: OUP.
- Everson, Michael; Pournader, Roozbeh (2007), Revised proposal to encode the Avestan script in the SMP of the UCS (PDF).
- Fossey, Charles (1948), "Notices sur les caractères étrangers anciens et modernes rédigées par une groupe de savants", Nouvelle édition mise à jour à l'occasion du 21^{e} Congrès des Orientalistes, Paris: Imprimerie Nationale de France.
- Hoffmann, Karl (1989), "Avestan language", Encyclopaedia Iranica, vol. 3, London: Routledge & Kegan Paul, pp. 47–52.
- Hoffmann, Karl; Forssman, Bernhard (1996), Avestische Laut- und Flexionslehre (in German), Innsbruck: Innsbrucker Beiträge zur Sprachwissenschaft, ISBN 3-85124-652-7.
- Kellens, Jean (1989), "Avesta", Encyclopaedia Iranica, vol. 3, London: Routledge & Kegan Paul, pp. 35–44.
