= Inscriptional Parthian (Unicode block) =

- Range: U+10B40..U+10B5F (32 code points)
- Plane: SMP
- Scripts: Inscriptional Parthian
- Assigned: 30 code points
- Unused: 2 reserved code points

Unicode version history
- 5.2 (2009): 30 (+30)

Unicode documentation
- Code chart ∣ Web page

Inscriptional Parthian is a Unicode block containing characters of the script used under the Sassanid Empire.

Inscriptional Parthian^{[1]}^{[2]} Official Unicode Consortium code chart (PDF)
	0	1	2	3	4	5	6	7	8	9	A	B	C	D	E	F
U+10B4x	𐭀	𐭁	𐭂	𐭃	𐭄	𐭅	𐭆	𐭇	𐭈	𐭉	𐭊	𐭋	𐭌	𐭍	𐭎	𐭏
U+10B5x	𐭐	𐭑	𐭒	𐭓	𐭔	𐭕			𐭘	𐭙	𐭚	𐭛	𐭜	𐭝	𐭞	𐭟
Notes: 1. As of Unicode version 16.0; 2. Grey areas indicate non-assigned code points

== History ==
The following Unicode-related documents record the purpose and process of defining specific characters in the Inscriptional Parthian block:

Version	Final code points (Note: Proposed code points and characters names may differ from final code points and names)	Count	L2 ID	WG2 ID	Document
5.2	U+10B40..10B55, 10B58..10B5F	30	L2/00-128		Bunz, Carl-Martin (2000-03-01), Scripts from the Past in Future Versions of Unicode
5.2	U+10B40..10B55, 10B58..10B5F	30	L2/01-007		Bunz, Carl-Martin (2000-12-21), "Inscriptional Alphabets (Middle Persian, Parthian) and Sogdian vs. Aramaic", Iranianist Meeting Report: Symposium on Encoding Iranian Scripts in Unicode
5.2	U+10B40..10B55, 10B58..10B5F	30	L2/07-102	N3241	Everson, Michael (2007-04-12), Proposal for encoding the Parthian, Inscriptional Pahlavi, and Psalter Pahlavi scripts in the BMP of the UCS
5.2	U+10B40..10B55, 10B58..10B5F	30		N3353 (pdf, doc)	Umamaheswaran, V. S. (2007-10-10), "M51.15", Unconfirmed minutes of WG 2 meeting 51 Hanzhou, China; 2007-04-24/27
5.2	U+10B40..10B55, 10B58..10B5F	30	L2/07-268	N3253 (pdf, doc)	Umamaheswaran, V. S. (2007-07-26), "8.17", Unconfirmed minutes of WG 2 meeting 50, Frankfurt-am-Main, Germany; 2007-04-24/27
5.2	U+10B40..10B55, 10B58..10B5F	30	L2/07-225		Moore, Lisa (2007-08-21), "C.8", UTC #112 Minutes
5.2	U+10B40..10B55, 10B58..10B5F	30	L2/07-207R	N3286R	Everson, Michael; Pournader, Roozbeh (2007-08-24), Proposal for encoding the Inscriptional Parthian, Inscriptional Pahlavi, and Psalter Pahlavi scripts in the SMP of the UCS
