= List of scripts with no ISO 15924 code =

The following writing scripts have not been allocated an ISO 15924 code.

- APL
- Avoiuli script
- Aztec script
- Badaga
- Bagam
- Balti A
- Balti B
- Bété
- Bhujimol script
- Borama
- Bronze scripts
- Brusha
- Byblos
- Chalukya
- Chola
- Coorgi–Cox alphabet
- Dhimal
- Eebee Hmog
- Epi Olmec
- Ersu Shaba script
- Eskaya
- Fula alphabets
- Gabelsberger shorthand
- Gangga Melayu
- Gregg shorthand
- Great Lakes Algonquian syllabics
- Gugyeol
- Gupta script
- Hamnosys
- Iban
- iConji
- IsiBheqe soHlamvu
- Kadamba
- Kaddare
- Kaida
- Karani
- Kherinci
- Khamti
- Khati baburi
- Khitan large script
- Khom script (Ong Kommadam)
- Khom Thai script
- Khotanese
- Kpelle
- Kulitan
- Lampung
- Laṇḍā scripts
- Leke
- Linear Elamite
- Lontara
- Luo
- Mangar akkha
- Mandombe
- Marchung
- Masaba
- Mi'kmaw hieroglyphs
- Minangkabau
- Mixtec
- Mwangwego script
- Naasioi
- Nasu
- Nisu
- Northern paleohispanic
- Numidian
- Nwagu Aneke script
- Old Minahasa
- Olmec
- Oracle bone script
- Pallava
- Pau Cin Hau logographs
- Pitman shorthand
- Pungchen
- Pungchung
- Pyu
- Quikscript
- Raina kama
- Ranajana
- Romanian transitional alphabet
- Rongo rongo
- Salifou hausa
- Sani yi
- Satavahana
- Seal script
- Shankha
- Shuishui logograms
- Sirmauri
- Sitelen Pona
- Southern Paleohospanic
- Stokoe
- Szarvas inscription
- Tani
- Teeline Shorthand
- Teotihuacan
- Tikamuli
- Tironian notes
- Tocharian script
- Unifon
- Vtafi
- Vtai yo
- Vtangsa
- Vatteluttu
- Veso Bey
- Western Cham
- Woleai
- Zapotec
- Zou
- Some fictional constructed writing systems

== See also ==
- ISO 15924
- List of ISO 15924 codes by letter code
- Under-ConScript Unicode Registry – Encoding of artificial scripts
