= Zaghawa =

Zaghawa may refer to:

- Zaghawa people
- Zaghawa language
