= Shuishu =

Shuishu may refer to:

- Shuǐshū (水书), the Chinese name for a writing system used by the Sui people
- Shūi Wakashū, an imperial anthology of Japanese waka
