= Beria Erfe (Unicode block) =

- Range: U+16EA0..U+16EDF (64 code points)
- Plane: SMP
- Scripts: Beria Erfe
- Assigned: 50 code points
- Unused: 14 reserved code points

Unicode version history
- 17.0 (2025): 50 (+50)

Unicode documentation
- Code chart ∣ Web page

Beria Erfe is a Unicode block containing letters for Zaghawa script, developed as a way to write the Zaghawa language (also known as Beria) of Sudan, Chad, and Libya.

== Block ==
Beria Erfe^{[1]}^{[2]} Official Unicode Consortium code chart (PDF)
	0	1	2	3	4	5	6	7	8	9	A	B	C	D	E	F
U+16EAx	𖺠	𖺡	𖺢	𖺣	𖺤	𖺥	𖺦	𖺧	𖺨	𖺩	𖺪	𖺫	𖺬	𖺭	𖺮	𖺯
U+16EBx	𖺰	𖺱	𖺲	𖺳	𖺴	𖺵	𖺶	𖺷	𖺸			𖺻	𖺼	𖺽	𖺾	𖺿
U+16ECx	𖻀	𖻁	𖻂	𖻃	𖻄	𖻅	𖻆	𖻇	𖻈	𖻉	𖻊	𖻋	𖻌	𖻍	𖻎	𖻏
U+16EDx	𖻐	𖻑	𖻒	𖻓												
Notes: 1. As of Unicode version 17.0; 2. Grey areas indicate non-assigned code points

== History ==
The following Unicode-related documents record the purpose and process of defining specific characters in the Beria Erfe block:

Version	Final code points (Note: Proposed code points and characters names may differ from final code points and names)	Count	L2 ID	Document
17.0	U+16EA0..16EB8, 16EBB..16ED3	50	L2/08-265	Priest, Lorna (2008-07-29), Preliminary proposal to encode Beria Giray Erfe (or Beria Branding Script)
17.0	U+16EA0..16EB8, 16EBB..16ED3	50	L2/08-323	McGowan, Rick (2008-08-13), "C.8", Scripts Subcommittee Draft Notes and Recommendations to UTC #116
17.0	U+16EA0..16EB8, 16EBB..16ED3	50	L2/22-073	Riley, Charles L. (2022-03-03), "Beria", Update on implementation status of African scripts
17.0	U+16EA0..16EB8, 16EBB..16ED3	50	L2/23-203	Yousuf, Oreen; Riley, Charles; Yacob, Daniel; Patel, Neil; Brookes, Tim (2023-09-08), "Beria Giray Erfe/Zaghawa", Update on Usage and Implementation Status of African Scripts
17.0	U+16EA0..16EB8, 16EBB..16ED3	50	L2/24-004R	Issa, Siddick Adam; et al. (2024-01-26), Proposal for encoding the Beria Erfe (Zaghawa) script in the SMP
17.0	U+16EA0..16EB8, 16EBB..16ED3	50	L2/24-013R	Anderson, Deborah; Goregaokar, Manish; Kučera, Jan; Whistler, Ken; Pournader, Roozbeh; Constable, Peter (2024-01-22), "1. Beria Erfe", Recommendations to UTC #178 January 2024 on Script Proposals
17.0	U+16EA0..16EB8, 16EBB..16ED3	50	L2/24-068	Anderson, Deborah; Goregaokar, Manish; Kučera, Jan; Whistler, Ken; Pournader, Roozbeh; Constable, Peter (2024-04-18), "1. Beria Erfe", Recommendations to UTC #179 April 2024 on Script Proposals
17.0	U+16EA0..16EB8, 16EBB..16ED3	50	L2/24-061	Constable, Peter (2024-04-29), "1. Beria Erfe", UTC #179 Minutes
