= Bidayat dialect =

Dialect of the Zaghawa language

Tuba
- Bidayat
- Native to: Chad
- Ethnicity: Bidayat
- Native speakers: (undated figure of 3,000)
- Language family: Nilo-Saharan?: Saharan; Eastern; Zaghawa; Tuba

Language codes
- ISO 639-3: –
- Glottolog: tuba1275

Tuba, also Bidayat (Bideyat), is a dialect of the Zaghawa language found in Chad and western Sudan. In contrast to their Zaghawa kin, Bidayat speakers are more nomadic. This difference led early ethnographers to refer to them as different groups until linguistic similarities proved their close relationship.

The former President of Chad, Idriss Déby belonged to this group by his mother's side.

The Late minister Togou Djimet Guero, Adam Diar Mogodi, Abakar Tolli Lougoum, the General Adoum Togoy Abbo Bechibo and his uncle General Seby Aguid Bechibo all belong also to this Group.
