= Awlad Mana =

Ethnic group in Sudan

Awlad Mana is an ethnic group of Sudan. It is a minority, that speaks Zaghawa, a Nilo-Saharan language. They number more than 150,000 people.

== The Zaghawa of Central Africa ==
A Cluster of 4 Zaghawa Groups in 2 countries; The Zaghawa people (who refer to themselves as the Beri), are scattered throughout central Africa in the countries of Chad and Sudan. All of the groups, including the Awlad Mana, speak Zaghawa (sometimes called Beri), which belongs to the Saharan branch of the Nilo-Saharan language family.

The Zaghawa inhabit a territory that consists mainly of grassy stretches and plateaus with deep gullies; desert surrounds them to the North, East, and West. Rainfall, though sometimes inadequate, provides the Zaghawa with fairly dense vegetation, since the water can seep quickly into the sandy soil. However, during the dry months, lack of water can become a problem. The tsetse fly, which causes sleeping sickness, can also be found in the southern regions.

The Zaghawa are an ancient society dating back to the 7th century. Long ago, they had their own kingdom that was separated into chiefdoms, castes (strict social classes), and family clans. The remnants of this ancient kingdom can still be seen today.

== Daily living ==
Since the independence of Sudan and Chad, the governments have greatly reduced the power of the Zaghawa chiefs. Also, Islam has weakened their traditional clan system. Today, the Zaghawa are concerned about their economic welfare, their political independence, and their national heritage. Their economy is based on animal husbandry, agriculture, gathering, and trading. Cattle, sheep, camels, and other animals are raised and marketed, primarily for their milk. The milk of cattle, sheep, and camels is consumed either hot or cold, sour or fresh, pure or mixed with water or tea, as a porridge mixed with millet, or as butter. The milk of a donkey may also by drunk as a remedy for coughing. Animal skins are used to make clothing and leather items, and the meat is eaten as a part of their diet.

Tubers (starchy root vegetables) and millet are grown in the fields, while vegetables such as onions, tomatoes, and okra are grown in small gardens surrounding the homes. The women are responsible for cultivating these small vegetable gardens. They also gather wild grasses, seeds, berries, and other fruits. Small groups of women set out for journeys that last about a month, taking with them all that is necessary for their gathering expedition. They sleep under shelters built from branches and bundles of grass. After the gathering is complete, the various grains are stored in earthen jars, for cereals are not mixed within the same granary. In addition to the products gathered by the women, the Zaghawa may also gather honey, certain leaves, and locusts for consumption.

Many Zaghawa are merchants, traveling southward and eastward to find food supplements and manufactured goods that they lack in their own region. Cattle, sheep, wild grasses, and the gum of the Acacia Senegal are exchanged for sugar, tea, oil, blankets, dried dates, soap, and aspirin.

Some of the Zaghawa work as blacksmiths (as these craftsmen are collectively called). Their craft involves making metal tools, weapons, and jewelry; making pottery; and carving wooden stools and musical instruments. A few of the blacksmiths also tan hides, make various leather items, weave cotton, and hunt. In times past, the blacksmiths depended primarily on hunting for survival. However, since the introduction of firearms in the area, there is a limited amount of game in the region. Among the Zaghawa, blacksmiths are considered to be the lowest caste.

Most Zaghawa villages contain Islamic mosques, which are used for prayer. There is also a "men's tree," where the men gather to discuss the affairs of the village. Inside the villages, young girls may be seen grinding grain and making porridge, while the young boys help with the herds or the harvest. From the time a child is very young, he is taught the way of life that his caste will offer them.

== Religion ==
Since the introduction of Islam to the region in the 17th century, most of the Zaghawa have gradually converted to Islam. However, some continue to practice their ethnic religion. They are very superstitious and have a strong belief in the "evil eye." This is a curse caused by an intent gaze of an envious person. To avoid such curses, babies' faces are covered in public, charms are worn, and even houses are constructed in a certain fashion.
