= ISO 15924 =

Defines two sets of codes for a number of writing systems

ISO 15924, Codes for the representation of names of scripts, is an international standard defining codes for writing systems or scripts (a "set of graphic characters used for the written form of one or more languages"). Each script is given both a four-letter code and a numeric code.

Where possible the codes are derived from ISO 639-2, where the name of a script and the name of a language using the script are identical (example: Gujarātī ISO 639 guj, ISO 15924 Gujr). Preference is given to the 639-2 Bibliographical codes, which is different from the otherwise often preferred use of the Terminological codes.

4-letter ISO 15924 codes are incorporated into the IANA Language Subtag Registry for IETF language tags and so can be used in file formats that make use of such language tags. For example, they can be used in HTML and XML to help Web browsers determine which typeface to use for foreign text. This way one could differentiate, for example, between Serbian written in the Cyrillic (sr-Cyrl) or Latin (sr-Latn) script, or mark romanized or transliterated text as such.

== Maintenance ==
ISO appointed the Unicode Consortium as the Registration Authority (RA) for the standard. The RA is responsible for appointing a registrar who works with a Joint Advisory Committee (JAC) in developing and implementing the standard. The registrar from 2004 to 2018 was Michael Everson, and from January 2019 the registrar has been Markus Scherer of Google. The JAC consists of six members: one representative of the RA (Markus Scherer), one representative of ISO 639-2 (Randall K. Barry of the Library of Congress), one representative of ISO/TC 37 (Christian Galinski), one representative of ISO/TC 46 (Peeter Päll), and two representatives of ISO/IEC JTC 1/SC 2 (Rick McGowan and Jan Kučera, both affiliated with the Unicode Consortium).

== Script codes ==
=== Numeric ranges ===
- 000–099 Hieroglyphic and cuneiform scripts
- 100–199 Right-to-left alphabetic scripts
- 200–299 Left-to-right alphabetic scripts
- 300–399 Alphasyllabic scripts
- 400–499 Syllabic scripts
- 500–599 Ideographic scripts
- 600–699 Undeciphered scripts
- 700–799 Shorthands and other notations
- 800–899 (unassigned)
- 900–999 Private use, alias, special codes

=== Special codes ===
- Qaaa–Qabx (900–949): 50 Codes reserved for private use (for example, Qaag is defined in LDML to mark Burmese text encoded for the Zawgyi font)
- Zsye 993: Emoji
- Zinh 994: Code for inherited script (Note: According to the Unicode Standard, Annex #24, version 13.0.0 Inherited is the Unicode script property value of "characters that may be used with multiple scripts, and that inherit their script from a preceding base character. These include nonspacing combining marks and enclosing combining marks, as well as U+200C ZERO WIDTH NON-JOINER and U+200D ZERO WIDTH JOINER." The value Inherited is described as matching the ISO 15924 code Zinh.)
- Zmth 995: Mathematical notation
- Zsym 996: Symbols
- Zxxx 997: Code for unwritten documents
- Zyyy 998: Code for undetermined script
- Zzzz 999: Code for uncoded script

=== Exceptionally reserved codes ===
Two four-letter codes are reserved at the request of the Common Locale Data Repository (CLDR) project:

- Root: Reserved for the language-neutral base of the CLDR locale tree
- True: Reserved for the Boolean value "true"

== List of codes ==
This list of codes is from the ISO 15924 standard.

Scripts in ISO 15924 and in Unicode
ISO 15924				Script in Unicode				
Code	ISO number	ISO formal name	Directionality	Unicode Alias	Version	Characters	Notes	Description
Adlm	166	Adlam	right-to-left script	Adlam	9.0	88		Ch 19.9
Afak	439	Afaka	left-to-right	— Not in Unicode, proposal is explored				
Aghb	239	Caucasian Albanian	left-to-right	Caucasian Albanian	7.0	53	Ancient/historic	Ch 8.11
Ahom	338	Ahom, Tai Ahom	left-to-right	Ahom	8.0	65	Ancient/historic	Ch 15.16
Arab	160	Arabic	right-to-left script	Arabic	1.0	1,413		Ch 9.2
Aran	161	Arabic (Nastaliq variant)	right-to-left script	— Typographic variant of Arabic (see § Arab)				
Armi	124	Imperial Aramaic	right-to-left script	Imperial Aramaic	5.2	31	Ancient/historic	Ch 10.4
Armn	230	Armenian	left-to-right	Armenian	1.0	96		Ch 7.6
Avst	134	Avestan	right-to-left script	Avestan	5.2	61	Ancient/historic	Ch 10.7
Bali	360	Balinese	left-to-right	Balinese	5.0	127		Ch 17.3
Bamu	435	Bamum	left-to-right	Bamum	5.2	657		Ch 19.6
Bass	259	Bassa Vah	left-to-right	Bassa Vah	7.0	36	Ancient/historic	Ch 19.7
Batk	365	Batak	left-to-right	Batak	6.0	56		Ch 17.6
Beng	325	Bengali (Bangla)	left-to-right	Bengali	1.0	96		Ch 12.2
Berf	258	Beria Erfe	left-to-right and top-down	Beria Erfe	17.0	50		
Bhks	334	Bhaiksuki	left-to-right	Bhaiksuki	9.0	97	Ancient/historic	Ch 14.3
Blis	550	Blissymbols	varies	— Not in Unicode, proposal is explored				
Bopo	285	Bopomofo	left-to-right, right-to-left script	Bopomofo	1.0	77		Ch 18.3
Brah	300	Brahmi	left-to-right	Brahmi	6.0	115	Ancient/historic	Ch 14.1
Brai	570	Braille	left-to-right, right-to-left script	Braille	3.0	256		Ch 21.1
Bugi	367	Buginese	left-to-right	Buginese	4.1	30		Ch 17.2
Buhd	372	Buhid	left-to-right	Buhid	3.2	20		Ch 17.1
Cakm	349	Chakma	left-to-right	Chakma	6.1	71		Ch 13.11
Cans	440	Unified Canadian Aboriginal Syllabics	left-to-right	Canadian Aboriginal	3.0	726		Ch 20.2
Cari	201	Carian	left-to-right, right-to-left script	Carian	5.1	49	Ancient/historic	Ch 8.5
Cham	358	Cham	left-to-right	Cham	5.1	83		Ch 16.10
Cher	445	Cherokee	left-to-right	Cherokee	3.0	172		Ch 20.1
Chis	298	Chisoi	left-to-right	— Not in Unicode, proposal is mature				
Chrs	109	Chorasmian	right-to-left script, top-to-bottom	Chorasmian	13.0	28	Ancient/historic	Ch 10.8
Cirt	291	Cirth	varies	— Not in Unicode				
Copt	204	Coptic	left-to-right	Coptic	1.0	137	Ancient/historic, disunified from Greek in 4.1	Ch 7.3
Cpmn	402	Cypro-Minoan	left-to-right	Cypro Minoan	14.0	99	Ancient/historic	Ch 8.4
Cprt	403	Cypriot syllabary	right-to-left script	Cypriot	4.0	55	Ancient/historic	Ch 8.3
Cyrl	220	Cyrillic	left-to-right	Cyrillic	1.0	508	Includes typographic variant Old Church Slavonic (see § Cyrs)	Ch 7.4
Cyrs	221	Cyrillic (Old Church Slavonic variant)	left-to-right	— Typographic variant of Cyrillic (see § Cyrl); Ancient/historic				
Deva	315	Devanagari (Nagari)	left-to-right	Devanagari	1.0	164		Ch 12.1
Diak	342	Dives Akuru	left-to-right	Dives Akuru	13.0	72	Ancient/historic	Ch 15.15
Dogr	328	Dogra	left-to-right	Dogra	11.0	60	Ancient/historic	Ch 15.18
Dsrt	250	Deseret (Mormon)	left-to-right	Deseret	3.1	80		Ch 20.4
Dupl	755	Duployan shorthand, Duployan stenography	left-to-right	Duployan	7.0	143		Ch 21.6
Egyd	070	Egyptian demotic	mixed	— Not in Unicode				
Egyh	060	Egyptian hieratic	mixed	— Not in Unicode				
Egyp	050	Egyptian hieroglyphs	right-to-left script, left-to-right, bottom-to-top, top-to-bottom	Egyptian Hieroglyphs	5.2	5,105	Ancient/historic	Ch 11.4
Elba	226	Elbasan	left-to-right	Elbasan	7.0	40	Ancient/historic	Ch 8.10
Elym	128	Elymaic	right-to-left script	Elymaic	12.0	23	Ancient/historic	Ch 10.9
Ethi	430	Ethiopic (Geʻez)	left-to-right	Ethiopic	3.0	523		Ch 19.1
Gara	164	Garay	right-to-left script	Garay	16.0	69		
Geok	241	Khutsuri (Asomtavruli and Nuskhuri)	left-to-right	Georgian			Unicode groups Khutsori, Asomtavruli and Nuskhuri into 'Georgian' (see § Geok). Similarly, Mkhedruli and Mtavruli are 'Georgian' (see § Geor)	Ch 7.7
Geor	240	Georgian (Mkhedruli and Mtavruli)	left-to-right	Georgian	1.0	173	In Unicode this also includes Nuskhuri (Geok)	Ch 7.7
Glag	225	Glagolitic	left-to-right	Glagolitic	4.1	134	Ancient/historic	Ch 7.5
Gong	312	Gunjala Gondi	left-to-right	Gunjala Gondi	11.0	63		Ch 13.15
Gonm	313	Masaram Gondi	left-to-right	Masaram Gondi	10.0	75		Ch 13.14
Goth	206	Gothic	left-to-right	Gothic	3.1	27	Ancient/historic	Ch 8.9
Gran	343	Grantha	left-to-right	Grantha	7.0	85	Ancient/historic	Ch 15.14
Grek	200	Greek	left-to-right	Greek	1.0	518	Directionality sometimes as boustrophedon	Ch 7.2
Gujr	320	Gujarati	left-to-right	Gujarati	1.0	91		Ch 12.4
Gukh	397	Gurung Khema	left-to-right	Gurung Khema	16.0	58		
Guru	310	Gurmukhi	left-to-right	Gurmukhi	1.0	80		Ch 12.3
Hanb	503	Han with Bopomofo (alias for Han + Bopomofo)	mixed	— See § Hani, § Bopo				
Hang	286	Hangul (Hangŭl, Hangeul)	left-to-right, vertical right-to-left	Hangul	1.0	11,739	Hangul syllables relocated in 2.0	Ch 18.6
Hani	500	Han (Hanzi, Kanji, Hanja)	top-to-bottom, columns right-to-left (historically)	Han	1.0	103,351		Ch 18.1
Hano	371	Hanunoo (Hanunóo)	left-to-right, bottom-to-top	Hanunoo	3.2	21		Ch 17.1
Hans	501	Han (Simplified variant)	varies	— Subset of Han (Hanzi, Kanji, Hanja) (see § Hani)				
Hant	502	Han (Traditional variant)	varies	— Subset of § Hani				
Hatr	127	Hatran	right-to-left script	Hatran	8.0	26	Ancient/historic	Ch 10.12
Hebr	125	Hebrew	right-to-left script	Hebrew	1.0	134		Ch 9.1
Hira	410	Hiragana	vertical right-to-left, left-to-right	Hiragana	1.0	381		Ch 18.4
Hluw	080	Anatolian Hieroglyphs (Luwian Hieroglyphs, Hittite Hieroglyphs)	left-to-right	Anatolian Hieroglyphs	8.0	583	Ancient/historic	Ch 11.6
Hmng	450	Pahawh Hmong	left-to-right	Pahawh Hmong	7.0	127		Ch 16.11
Hmnp	451	Nyiakeng Puachue Hmong	left-to-right	Nyiakeng Puachue Hmong	12.0	71		Ch 16.12
Hntl	504	Han (Traditional variant) with Latin (alias for Hant + Latn)		— See § Hant and § Latn				
Hrkt	412	Japanese syllabaries (alias for Hiragana + Katakana)	vertical right-to-left, left-to-right	Katakana or Hiragana			See § Hira, § Kana	Ch 18.4
Hung	176	Old Hungarian (Hungarian Runic)	right-to-left script	Old Hungarian	8.0	108	Ancient/historic	Ch 8.8
Inds	610	Indus (Harappan)	right-to-left script, boustrophedon	— Not in Unicode, proposal is explored				
Ital	210	Old Italic (Etruscan, Oscan, etc.)	right-to-left script, left-to-right	Old Italic	3.1	39	Ancient/historic	Ch 8.6
Jamo	284	Jamo (alias for Jamo subset of Hangul)	varies	— Subset of § Hang				
Java	361	Javanese	left-to-right	Javanese	5.2	90		Ch 17.4
Jpan	413	Japanese (alias for Han + Hiragana + Katakana)	varies	— See § Hani, § Hira and § Kana				
Jurc	510	Jurchen	left-to-right	— Not in Unicode				
Kali	357	Kayah Li	left-to-right	Kayah Li	5.1	47		Ch 16.9
Kana	411	Katakana	vertical right-to-left, left-to-right	Katakana	1.0	321		Ch 18.4
Kawi	368	Kawi	left-to-right	Kawi	15.0	87	Ancient/historic	Ch 17.9
Khar	305	Kharoshthi	right-to-left script	Kharoshthi	4.1	68	Ancient/historic	Ch 14.2
Khmr	355	Khmer	left-to-right	Khmer	3.0	146		Ch 16.4
Khoj	322	Khojki	left-to-right	Khojki	7.0	65	Ancient/historic	Ch 15.7
Kitl	505	Khitan large script	left-to-right	— Not in Unicode				
Kits	288	Khitan small script	vertical right-to-left	Khitan Small Script	13.0	472	Ancient/historic	Ch 18.12
Knda	345	Kannada	left-to-right	Kannada	1.0	92		Ch 12.8
Kore	287	Korean (alias for Hangul + Han)	left-to-right	— See § Hani, § Hang				
Kpel	436	Kpelle	left-to-right	— Not in Unicode, proposal is explored				
Krai	396	Kirat Rai	left-to-right	Kirat Rai	16.0	58		
Kthi	317	Kaithi	left-to-right	Kaithi	5.2	68	Ancient/historic	Ch 15.2
Lana	351	Tai Tham (Lanna)	left-to-right	Tai Tham	5.2	127		Ch 16.7
Laoo	356	Lao	left-to-right	Lao	1.0	83		Ch 16.2
Latf	217	Latin (Fraktur variant)	left-to-right	— Typographic variant of Latin (see § Latn)				
Latg	216	Latin (Gaelic variant)	left-to-right	— Typographic variant of Latin (see § Latn)				
Latn	215	Latin	left-to-right	Latin	1.0	1,492	See also: Latin script in Unicode	Ch 7.1
Leke	364	Leke	left-to-right	— Not in Unicode				
Lepc	335	Lepcha (Róng)	left-to-right	Lepcha	5.1	74		Ch 13.12
Limb	336	Limbu	left-to-right	Limbu	4.0	68		Ch 13.6
Lina	400	Linear A	left-to-right	Linear A	7.0	341	Ancient/historic	Ch 8.1
Linb	401	Linear B	left-to-right	Linear B	4.0	211	Ancient/historic	Ch 8.2
Lisu	399	Lisu (Fraser)	left-to-right	Lisu	5.2	49		Ch 18.9
Loma	437	Loma	left-to-right	— Not in Unicode, proposal is explored				
Lyci	202	Lycian	left-to-right	Lycian	5.1	29	Ancient/historic	Ch 8.5
Lydi	116	Lydian	right-to-left script	Lydian	5.1	27	Ancient/historic	Ch 8.5
Mahj	314	Mahajani	left-to-right	Mahajani	7.0	39	Ancient/historic	Ch 15.6
Maka	366	Makasar	left-to-right	Makasar	11.0	25	Ancient/historic	Ch 17.8
Mand	140	Mandaic, Mandaean	right-to-left script	Mandaic	6.0	29		Ch 9.5
Mani	139	Manichaean	right-to-left script	Manichaean	7.0	51	Ancient/historic	Ch 10.5
Marc	332	Marchen	left-to-right	Marchen	9.0	68	Ancient/historic	Ch 14.5
Maya	090	Mayan hieroglyphs	mixed	— Not in Unicode				
Medf	265	Medefaidrin (Oberi Okaime, Oberi Ɔkaimɛ)	left-to-right	Medefaidrin	11.0	91		Ch 19.10
Mend	438	Mende Kikakui	right-to-left script	Mende Kikakui	7.0	213		Ch 19.8
Merc	101	Meroitic Cursive	right-to-left script	Meroitic Cursive	6.1	90	Ancient/historic	Ch 11.5
Mero	100	Meroitic Hieroglyphs	right-to-left script	Meroitic Hieroglyphs	6.1	32	Ancient/historic	Ch 11.5
Mlym	347	Malayalam	left-to-right	Malayalam	1.0	118		Ch 12.9
Modi	324	Modi, Moḍī	left-to-right	Modi	7.0	79	Ancient/historic	Ch 15.12
Mong	145	Mongolian	vertical left-to-right, left-to-right	Mongolian	3.0	168	Mong includes Clear and Manchu scripts	Ch 13.5
Moon	218	Moon (Moon code, Moon script, Moon type)	mixed	— Not in Unicode, proposal is explored				
Mroo	264	Mro, Mru	left-to-right	Mro	7.0	43		Ch 13.8
Mtei	337	Meitei Mayek (Meithei, Meetei)	left-to-right	Meetei Mayek	5.2	79		Ch 13.7
Mult	323	Multani	left-to-right	Multani	8.0	38	Ancient/historic	Ch 15.10
Mymr	350	Myanmar (Burmese)	left-to-right	Myanmar	3.0	243		Ch 16.3
Nagm	295	Nag Mundari	left-to-right	Nag Mundari	15.0	42		
Nand	311	Nandinagari	left-to-right	Nandinagari	12.0	65	Ancient/historic	Ch 15.13
Narb	106	Old North Arabian (Ancient North Arabian)	right-to-left script	Old North Arabian	7.0	32	Ancient/historic	Ch 10.1
Nbat	159	Nabataean	right-to-left script	Nabataean	7.0	40	Ancient/historic	Ch 10.10
Newa	333	Newa, Newar, Newari, Nepāla lipi	left-to-right	Newa	9.0	97		Ch 13.3
Nkdb	085	Naxi Dongba (na²¹ɕi³³ to³³ba²¹, Nakhi Tomba)	left-to-right	— Not in Unicode				
Nkgb	420	Naxi Geba (na²¹ɕi³³ gʌ²¹ba²¹, 'Na-'Khi ²Ggŏ-¹baw, Nakhi Geba)	left-to-right	— Not in Unicode, proposal is explored				
Nkoo	165	N’Ko	right-to-left script	NKo	5.0	62		Ch 19.4
Nshu	499	Nüshu	vertical right-to-left	Nushu	10.0	397		Ch 18.8
Ogam	212	Ogham	bottom-to-top, left-to-right	Ogham	3.0	29	Ancient/historic	Ch 8.14
Olck	261	Ol Chiki (Ol Cemet’, Ol, Santali)	left-to-right	Ol Chiki	5.1	48		Ch 13.10
Onao	296	Ol Onal	left-to-right	Ol Onal	16.0	44		
Orkh	175	Old Turkic, Orkhon Runic	right-to-left script	Old Turkic	5.2	73	Ancient/historic	Ch 14.8
Orya	327	Oriya (Odia)	left-to-right	Oriya	1.0	91		Ch 12.5
Osge	219	Osage	left-to-right	Osage	9.0	72		Ch 20.3
Osma	260	Osmanya	left-to-right	Osmanya	4.0	40		Ch 19.2
Ougr	143	Old Uyghur	mixed	Old Uyghur	14.0	26	Ancient/historic	Ch 14.11
Palm	126	Palmyrene	right-to-left script	Palmyrene	7.0	32	Ancient/historic	Ch 10.11
Pauc	263	Pau Cin Hau	left-to-right	Pau Cin Hau	7.0	57		Ch 16.13
Pcun	015	Proto-Cuneiform	left-to-right	— Not in Unicode				
Pelm	016	Proto-Elamite	left-to-right	— Not in Unicode				
Perm	227	Old Permic	left-to-right	Old Permic	7.0	43	Ancient/historic	Ch 8.13
Phag	331	Phags-pa	vertical left-to-right	Phags-pa	5.0	56	Ancient/historic	Ch 14.4
Phli	131	Inscriptional Pahlavi	right-to-left script	Inscriptional Pahlavi	5.2	27	Ancient/historic	Ch 10.6
Phlp	132	Psalter Pahlavi	right-to-left script	Psalter Pahlavi	7.0	29	Ancient/historic	Ch 10.6
Phlv	133	Book Pahlavi	mixed	— Not in Unicode				
Phnx	115	Phoenician	right-to-left script	Phoenician	5.0	29	Ancient/historic	Ch 10.3
Piqd	293	Klingon (KLI pIqaD)	left-to-right	— Rejected for inclusion in Unicode				
Plrd	282	Miao (Pollard)	left-to-right	Miao	6.1	149		Ch 18.10
Prti	130	Inscriptional Parthian	right-to-left script	Inscriptional Parthian	5.2	30	Ancient/historic	Ch 10.6
Psin	103	Proto-Sinaitic	mixed	— Not in Unicode				
Qaaa-Qabx	900-949	Reserved for private use (range)		— Not in Unicode				
Ranj	303	Ranjana	left-to-right	— Not in Unicode				
Rjng	363	Rejang (Redjang, Kaganga)	left-to-right	Rejang	5.1	37		Ch 17.5
Rohg	167	Hanifi Rohingya	right-to-left script	Hanifi Rohingya	11.0	50		Ch 16.14
Roro	620	Rongorongo	mixed	— Not in Unicode, proposal is explored				
Runr	211	Runic	left-to-right, boustrophedon	Runic	3.0	86	Ancient/historic	Ch 8.7
Samr	123	Samaritan	right-to-left script, top-to-bottom	Samaritan	5.2	61		Ch 9.4
Sara	292	Sarati	mixed	— Not in Unicode				
Sarb	105	Old South Arabian	right-to-left script	Old South Arabian	5.2	32	Ancient/historic	Ch 10.2
Saur	344	Saurashtra	left-to-right	Saurashtra	5.1	82		Ch 13.13
Seal	590	(Small) Seal	varies	— Not in Unicode, proposal is explored				
Sgnw	095	SignWriting	vertical left-to-right	SignWriting	8.0	672		Ch 21.7
Shaw	281	Shavian (Shaw)	left-to-right	Shavian	4.0	48		Ch 8.15
Shrd	319	Sharada, Śāradā	left-to-right	Sharada	6.1	104		Ch 15.3
Shui	530	Shuishu	left-to-right	— Not in Unicode				
Sidd	302	Siddham, Siddhaṃ, Siddhamātṛkā	left-to-right	Siddham	7.0	92	Ancient/historic	Ch 15.5
Sidt	180	Sidetic	right-to-left script	Sidetic	17.0	26	Ancient/historic	
Sind	318	Khudawadi, Sindhi	left-to-right	Khudawadi	7.0	69		Ch 15.9
Sinh	348	Sinhala	left-to-right	Sinhala	3.0	111		Ch 13.2
Sogd	141	Sogdian	horizontal and vertical writing in East Asian scripts, top-to-bottom	Sogdian	11.0	42	Ancient/historic	Ch 14.10
Sogo	142	Old Sogdian	right-to-left script	Old Sogdian	11.0	40	Ancient/historic	Ch 14.9
Sora	398	Sora Sompeng	left-to-right	Sora Sompeng	6.1	35		Ch 15.17
Soyo	329	Soyombo	left-to-right	Soyombo	10.0	83	Ancient/historic	Ch 14.7
Sund	362	Sundanese	left-to-right	Sundanese	5.1	72		Ch 17.7
Sunu	274	Sunuwar	left-to-right	Sunuwar	16.0	44		
Sylo	316	Syloti Nagri	left-to-right	Syloti Nagri	4.1	45	Ancient/historic	Ch 15.1
Syrc	135	Syriac	right-to-left script	Syriac	3.0	88	Includes typographic variants Estrangelo (see § Syre), Western (§ Syrj), and Eastern (§ Syrn)	Ch 9.3
Syre	138	Syriac (Estrangelo variant)	right-to-left script	— Typographic variant of Syriac (see § Syrc)				
Syrj	137	Syriac (Western variant)	right-to-left script	— Typographic variant of Syriac (see § Syrc)				
Syrn	136	Syriac (Eastern variant)	right-to-left script	— Typographic variant of Syriac (see § Syrc)				
Tagb	373	Tagbanwa	left-to-right	Tagbanwa	3.2	18		Ch 17.1
Takr	321	Takri, Ṭākrī, Ṭāṅkrī	left-to-right	Takri	6.1	68		Ch 15.4
Tale	353	Tai Le	left-to-right	Tai Le	4.0	35		Ch 16.5
Talu	354	New Tai Lue	left-to-right	New Tai Lue	4.1	83		Ch 16.6
Taml	346	Tamil	left-to-right	Tamil	1.0	123		Ch 12.6
Tang	520	Tangut	vertical right-to-left, left-to-right	Tangut	9.0	7,059	Ancient/historic	Ch 18.11
Tavt	359	Tai Viet	left-to-right	Tai Viet	5.2	72		Ch 16.8
Tayo	380	Tai Yo	vertical right-to-left	Tai Yo	17.0	55		
Telu	340	Telugu	left-to-right	Telugu	1.0	101		Ch 12.7
Teng	290	Tengwar	left-to-right	— Not in Unicode				
Tfng	120	Tifinagh (Berber)	right-to-left script, left-to-right, top-to-bottom, bottom-to-top	Tifinagh	4.1	59		Ch 19.3
Tglg	370	Tagalog (Baybayin, Alibata)	left-to-right	Tagalog	3.2	23		Ch 17.1
Thaa	170	Thaana	right-to-left script	Thaana	3.0	50		Ch 13.1
Thai	352	Thai	left-to-right	Thai	1.0	86		Ch 16.1
Tibt	330	Tibetan	left-to-right	Tibetan	2.0	207	Added in 1.0, removed in 1.1 and reintroduced in 2.0	Ch 13.4
Tirh	326	Tirhuta	left-to-right	Tirhuta	7.0	82		Ch 15.11
Tnsa	275	Tangsa	left-to-right	Tangsa	14.0	89		Ch 13.18
Todr	229	Todhri	left-to-right	Todhri	16.0	52	Ancient/historic	
Tols	299	Tolong Siki	left-to-right	Tolong Siki	17.0	54		
Toto	294	Toto	left-to-right	Toto	14.0	31		Ch 13.17
Tutg	341	Tulu-Tigalari	left-to-right	Tulu Tigalari	16.0	80	Ancient/historic	
Ugar	040	Ugaritic	left-to-right	Ugaritic	4.0	31	Ancient/historic	Ch 11.2
Vaii	470	Vai	left-to-right	Vai	5.1	300		Ch 19.5
Visp	280	Visible Speech	left-to-right	— Not in Unicode				
Vith	228	Vithkuqi	left-to-right	Vithkuqi	14.0	70	Ancient/historic	Ch 8.12
Wara	262	Warang Citi (Varang Kshiti)	left-to-right	Warang Citi	7.0	84		Ch 13.9
Wcho	283	Wancho	left-to-right	Wancho	12.0	59		Ch 13.16
Wole	480	Woleai	left-to-right	— Not in Unicode, proposal is explored				
Xpeo	030	Old Persian	left-to-right	Old Persian	4.1	50	Ancient/historic	Ch 11.3
Xsux	020	Cuneiform, Sumero-Akkadian	left-to-right	Cuneiform	5.0	1,234	Ancient/historic	Ch 11.1
Yezi	192	Yezidi	right-to-left script	Yezidi	13.0	47	Ancient/historic	Ch 9.6
Yiii	460	Yi	left-to-right	Yi	3.0	1,220		Ch 18.7
Zanb	339	Zanabazar Square (Zanabazarin Dörböljin Useg, Xewtee Dörböljin Bicig, Horizontal Square Script)	left-to-right	Zanabazar Square	10.0	72	Ancient/historic	Ch 14.6
Zinh	994	Code for inherited script		Inherited		684		
Zmth	995	Mathematical notation		— Not a 'script' in Unicode				
Zsye	993	Symbols (emoji variant)		— Not a 'script' in Unicode				
Zsym	996	Symbols		— Not a 'script' in Unicode				
Zxxx	997	Code for unwritten documents		— Not a 'script' in Unicode				
Zyyy	998	Code for undetermined script		Common		9,123		
Zzzz	999	Code for uncoded script		Unknown		954,246	In Unicode: All other code points	
Notes: 1. ISO 15924 publications As of 24 April 2025; 2. ISO 15924 Normative text file As of 24 April 2025; 3. ISO 15924 Changes (including Aliases for Unicode; as of 24 April 2025); 4. Unicode version 17.0; 5. "Unicode 17.0 Character Code Charts".; 6. Unicode uses the "Property Value Alias" (Alias) as the script-name. These Alias names are part of Unicode and are published informatively next to ISO 15924. An alias script name may be used in a character name: Palm, Palmyrene → U+10860 𐡠 PALMYRENE LETTER ALEPH.; 7. In Unicode, the Phoenician script is intended for the representation of text in Paleo-Hebrew, Archaic Phoenician, Phoenician, Early Aramaic, Late Phoenician cursive, Phoenician papyri, Siloam Hebrew, Hebrew seals, Ammonite, Moabite, and Punic.

== Relations to other standards ==
The following standards are referred to as indispensable by ISO 15924.

- ISO 639-2:1998 Codes for the representation of names of languages — Part 2: Alpha-3 code
- ISO/IEC 9541-1:1991 Information technology — Font information interchange — Part 1: Architecture
- ISO/IEC 10646-1:2020 Information technology — Universal Multiple-Octet Coded Character Set (UCS)

For definition of font and glyph the standard refers to

- ISO/IEC 9541-1:1991

Around 160 scripts are defined in Unicode. Through a linkpin called "Property Value Alias", Unicode has made a 1:1 connection between a script defined, and its ISO 15924 standard. See Script (Unicode).

== See also ==
- List of scripts with no ISO 15924 code
