= Leke script =

Writing system used for some Karen languages

Leke
- Script type: abugida
- Created: 1800s
- Direction: Left-to-right
- Languages: Eastern Pwo

ISO 15924
- ISO 15924: Leke (364), Leke

The Leke script, previously known as Karen Chicken Scratch script, is an abugida used to write the Pwo Karen language and Sgaw language in Burma (Myanmar) and Thailand by members of the Lehkai Ariya religion. It has 25 consonants, 17 vowels and 3 tones. The script also has a unique set of numerals and punctuation, such as a full stop (period) and a comma.

Leke is a phonemic script: words are written the way they are pronounced. In modern Leke script, consonants are written first, then the vowels and tones are written around them. In text encoding, the vowels of a syllable always follow the consonant, even the two vowels dwia thwai and ri yah, though they're written to the left of the consonant.

== History ==
According to traditional Karen history, the Leke script was known as the Karen Chicken Scratch script. Why the earlier older Karen people was named this script as Chicken Scratch is because the story was told from generation to generation. It's said the first human lived in this planet is God's Ariya and his Seven sons in this world.

== Summary ==
The Leke script was developed between 1830 and 1860 and is used by members of the millenarian Leke sect of Buddhism. It is believed to have borrowed from ancient Mon, based on the shapes and functions of older versions of the Burmese script. The script is also used by other Buddhists, Christians, and members of the unique Lehkai Ariya religion. According to the chief Leke priest, there are over 3,200 trained teachers of the alphabet.

Other scripts are also used by the Leke, including varieties of the Mon and Burmese alphabets, and refugees in Thailand have created a Thai alphabet, which is in limited use.

Pwo Karen Leke script	Pronunciation	Translate
	Aw So La Sik	Hello

== Unicode ==
As of Unicode 18, Leke is not supported by Unicode. It has, however, been formally accepted for publication.
