= Zaghawa script =

Indigenous alphabet proposed for the Zaghawa

Zaghawa Beria (𖺡𖺾𖻌𖻂𖺻)
- Script type: Alphabet
- Direction: Left-to-right and top-down

ISO 15924
- ISO 15924: Berf (258), Beria Erfe

Unicode
- Unicode alias: Beria Erfe
- Unicode range: U+16EA0–U+16EDF

The Zaghawa or Beria script, Beria Giray Erfe (𖺡𖺾𖻌𖻂𖺻 𖺥𖻂𖻌𖺻𖻓 𖺣𖻌𖺿𖺾𖺾) ('Zaghawa Writing Marks'), is an indigenous alphabetic script used to write the Beria language (also known as Zaghawa in Arabic) of Sudan, Chad, and Libya. It is one of three scripts used to write Zaghawa, alongside Latin script and Arabic script.

== History ==
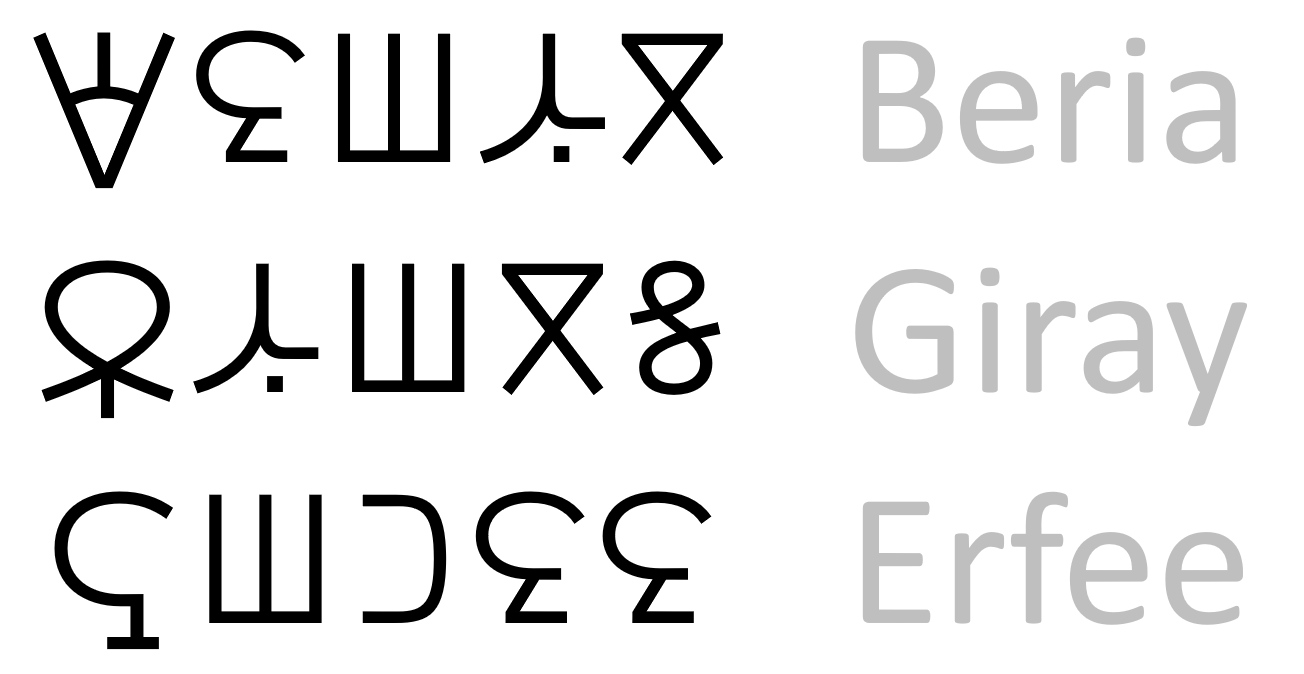
Beria Giray Erfe (𖺡𖺾𖻌𖻂𖺻 𖺥𖻂𖻌𖺻𖻓 𖺣𖻌𖺿𖺾𖺾)

In the 1950s, a Sudanese Zaghawa schoolteacher named Adam Tajir created a script for the Zaghawa language, sometimes known as the camel alphabet, deriving its glyphs from the clan brands used for camels and other livestock. He copied the inventory of the Arabic script, so the system was not ideal for Zaghawa.

In 2000, a Zaghawa veterinarian named Siddick Adam Issa adapted Tajir's script to a form which has proven popular in the Zaghawa community. The typography is somewhat innovative in that capital letters have descenders which drop below the baseline of the lower-case letters and punctuation, contrasting with the capital letters in the Latin script, which rise above most lower-case letters. Beria Giray Erfe is a full alphabet, with independent letters for vowels; however, diacritics are used to mark tone (grave accent for falling tone and acute accent for rising tone; high, mid, and low tone are unmarked), as well as advanced tongue root vowels (a macron derives /i e ə o u/ from the letters for /ɪ ɛ a ɔ ʊ/).

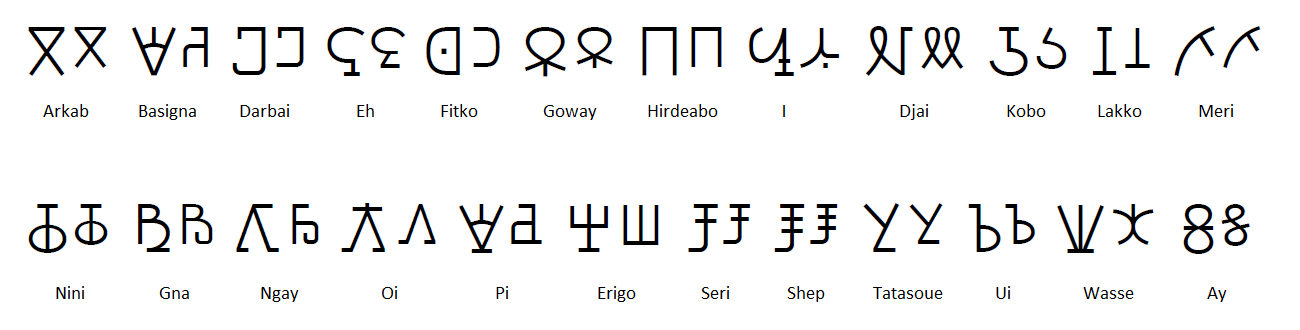
The upper-case (left) and lower-case (right) letter pairs of the Zaghawa also known as Beria alphabet. Alphabetic order follows the Latin: /a b d ɛ f ɡ h~ħ ɪ ʒ k l m n ɲ ŋ ɔ p ɾ~r s ʃ t ʊ w j/.

The letter for /p/, which does not occur in Zaghawa or in Arabic, is written by adding a tail to the letter for /b/; and /ʃ/ is derived from the letter for /s/ with a cross stroke. There apparently is no letter for /ħ/, nor a distinction between /ɾ/ and /r/, both of which have been reported for Zaghawa.

Hindu-Arabic numerals are used.

== Characters ==
=== Letters ===
| Uppercase | Lowercase | Letter Name | IPA |
|---|---|---|---|
| 𖺠 | 𖺻 | Arkab | /a/ |
| 𖺡 | 𖺼 | Basigna | /b/ |
| 𖺢 | 𖺽 | Darbai | /d/ |
| 𖺣 | 𖺾 | Eh | /ɛ/ |
| 𖺤 | 𖺿 | Fitko | /f/ |
| 𖺥 | 𖻀 | Goway | /ɡ/ |
| 𖺦 | 𖻁 | Hirdeabo | /h/ |
| 𖺧 | 𖻂 | I | /ɪ/ |
| 𖺨 | 𖻃 | Djai | /ɟ/ |
| 𖺩 | 𖻄 | Kobo | /k/ |
| 𖺪 | 𖻅 | Lakko | /l/ |
| 𖺫 | 𖻆 | Meri | /m/ |
| 𖺬 | 𖻇 | Nini | /n/ |
| 𖺭 | 𖻈 | Gna | /ɲ/ |
| 𖺮 | 𖻉 | Ngay | /ŋ/ |
| 𖺯 | 𖻊 | Oi | /ɔ/ |
| 𖺰 | 𖻋 | Pi | /p/ |
| 𖺱 | 𖻌 | Erigo | /ɾ/ |
| 𖺲 | 𖻍 | Erigo Tamura | /ɻ/ |
| 𖺳 | 𖻎 | Seri | /s/ |
| 𖺴 | 𖻏 | Shep | /ʃ/ |
| 𖺵 | 𖻐 | Tatasoue | /t/ |
| 𖺶 | 𖻑 | Ui | /ʊ/ |
| 𖺷 | 𖻒 | Wasse | /w/ |
| 𖺸 | 𖻓 | Ay | /j/ |

Diphthongs are written simply as a sequence of vowel letters. For example:

- 𖺡𖺾𖻌𖻂𖺻 /beria/ (Beria language)
- 𖺼𖺻𖺾𖻌𖻂 𖺻𖻁 /baɛɾɪ ah/ (alphabet)

The letter 𖺲/𖻍 (Erigo Tamura), which makes the sound /ɻ/, is mostly used in Chadian dialects of Beria (Kube, Tuba, and Dirong). Some places that are spelled with this letter include: 𖺦𖻂̄𖻍𖻂𖺼𖺻 (Iriba) a town in Chad, and 𖺢𖺻𖻌 𖺡𖻂̄𖻍𖻂𖺻 (Dar Bilia) a traditional sultanate and territory in northeastern Chad, centered around Amdjarass in the Ennedi Est. The /ɻ/ sound is not found in most neighboring languages, nor in the Sudanese dialect of Beria (Wegi).

The letter 𖺴/𖻏 (Shep) usually represents sounds from other languages.

=== Diacritics ===
| Diacritic | Description |
|---|---|
| ◌̄ | +ATR (Advanced Tongue Route). This diacritic is placed only on the first vowel in a word. |

Placing this diacritic on the following vowel-letters creates the indicated vowels:

- 𖺧̄/𖻂̄: /i/
- 𖺣̄/𖺾̄: /e/
- 𖺠̄/𖺻̄: /ә/
- 𖺯̄/𖻊̄: /o/
- 𖺶̄/𖻑̄: /u/

Example words that use the +ATR diacritic:

- 𖻂̄𖻎𖺾 /ise/: "food"
- 𖺾̄𖻇𖻂 /eni/: "riverbed"
- 𖻊̄𖻇𖻂 /oni/: "behind"
- 𖻎𖻑̄𖻌𖻑 /suru/: "shell"

== Unicode ==
The Zaghawa scripts was added to the Unicode Standard in September 2025 with the release of version 17.0.

The Unicode block for Zaghawa, called Beria Erfe, is U+16EA0–U+16EDF:

Beria Erfe^{[1]}^{[2]} Official Unicode Consortium code chart (PDF)
| | 0 | 1 | 2 | 3 | 4 | 5 | 6 | 7 | 8 | 9 | A | B | C | D | E | F |
| U+16EAx | 𖺠 | 𖺡 | 𖺢 | 𖺣 | 𖺤 | 𖺥 | 𖺦 | 𖺧 | 𖺨 | 𖺩 | 𖺪 | 𖺫 | 𖺬 | 𖺭 | 𖺮 | 𖺯 |
| U+16EBx | 𖺰 | 𖺱 | 𖺲 | 𖺳 | 𖺴 | 𖺵 | 𖺶 | 𖺷 | 𖺸 | | | 𖺻 | 𖺼 | 𖺽 | 𖺾 | 𖺿 |
| U+16ECx | 𖻀 | 𖻁 | 𖻂 | 𖻃 | 𖻄 | 𖻅 | 𖻆 | 𖻇 | 𖻈 | 𖻉 | 𖻊 | 𖻋 | 𖻌 | 𖻍 | 𖻎 | 𖻏 |
| U+16EDx | 𖻐 | 𖻑 | 𖻒 | 𖻓 | | | | | | | | | | | | |
Notes 1.As of Unicode version 18.0 2.Grey areas indicate non-assigned code points
