= Inscriptional Parthian =

Parthian language coin script from 250 BC

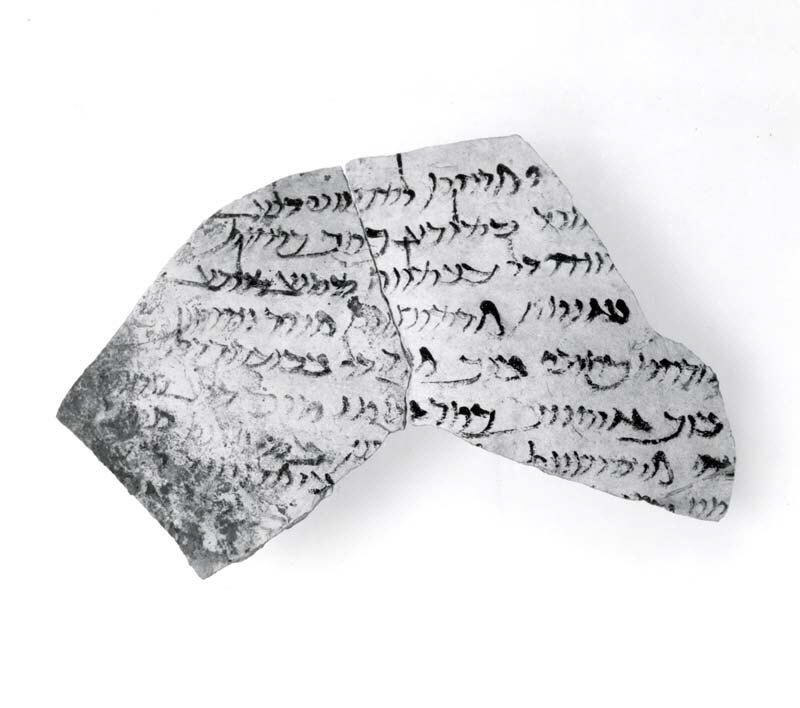
- Ostracon in Parthian script, from Nippur
- Script type: Abjad
- Period: c. 100 CE – c. 400 CE
- Direction: Right-to-left script
- Languages: Parthian language

Related scripts
- Parent systems: Aramaic alphabet: Pahlavi scripts; Inscriptional Parthian

ISO 15924
- ISO 15924: Prti (130), Inscriptional Parthian

Unicode
- Unicode alias: Inscriptional Parthian
- Unicode range: U+10B40–U+10B5F

Inscriptional Parthian was a script used to write the Parthian language; the majority of the text found has been from clay fragments. This script was used from the 2nd century CE to the 5th century CE or in the Parthian Empire to the early Sasanian Empire. During the Sasanian Empire, it was mostly used for official texts.

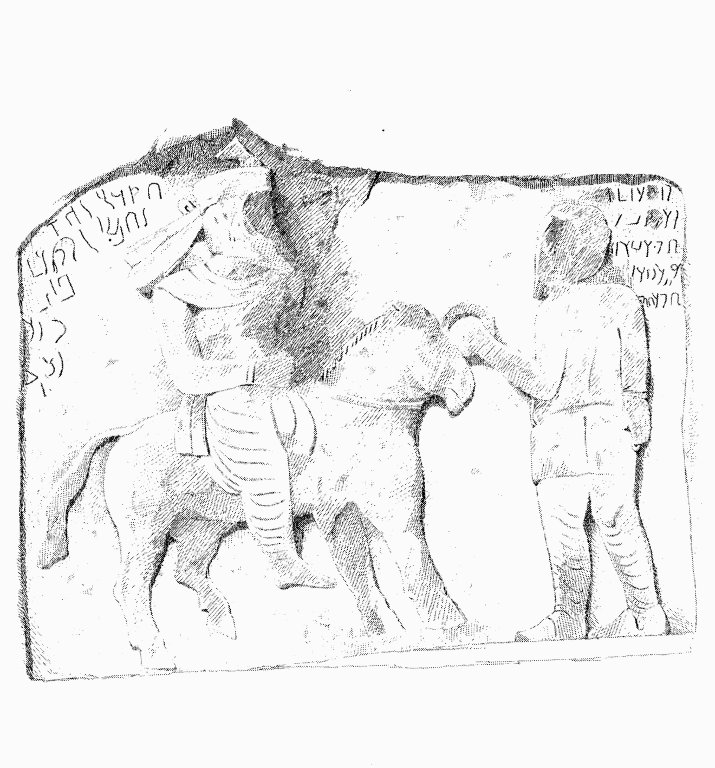
Drawing of a Parthian relief at Sarpol-e Zahab. What can be read of the inscription behind the rider reads: ptkr ZNH̱ NPSH̱ gwtrz MLKʾ (𐭐𐭕𐭊𐭓 𐭆𐭍𐭄 𐭍𐭐𐭎𐭄 𐭂𐭅𐭕𐭓𐭆 𐭌𐭋𐭊𐭀) 'This (is) the own image of Gōdarz, king'

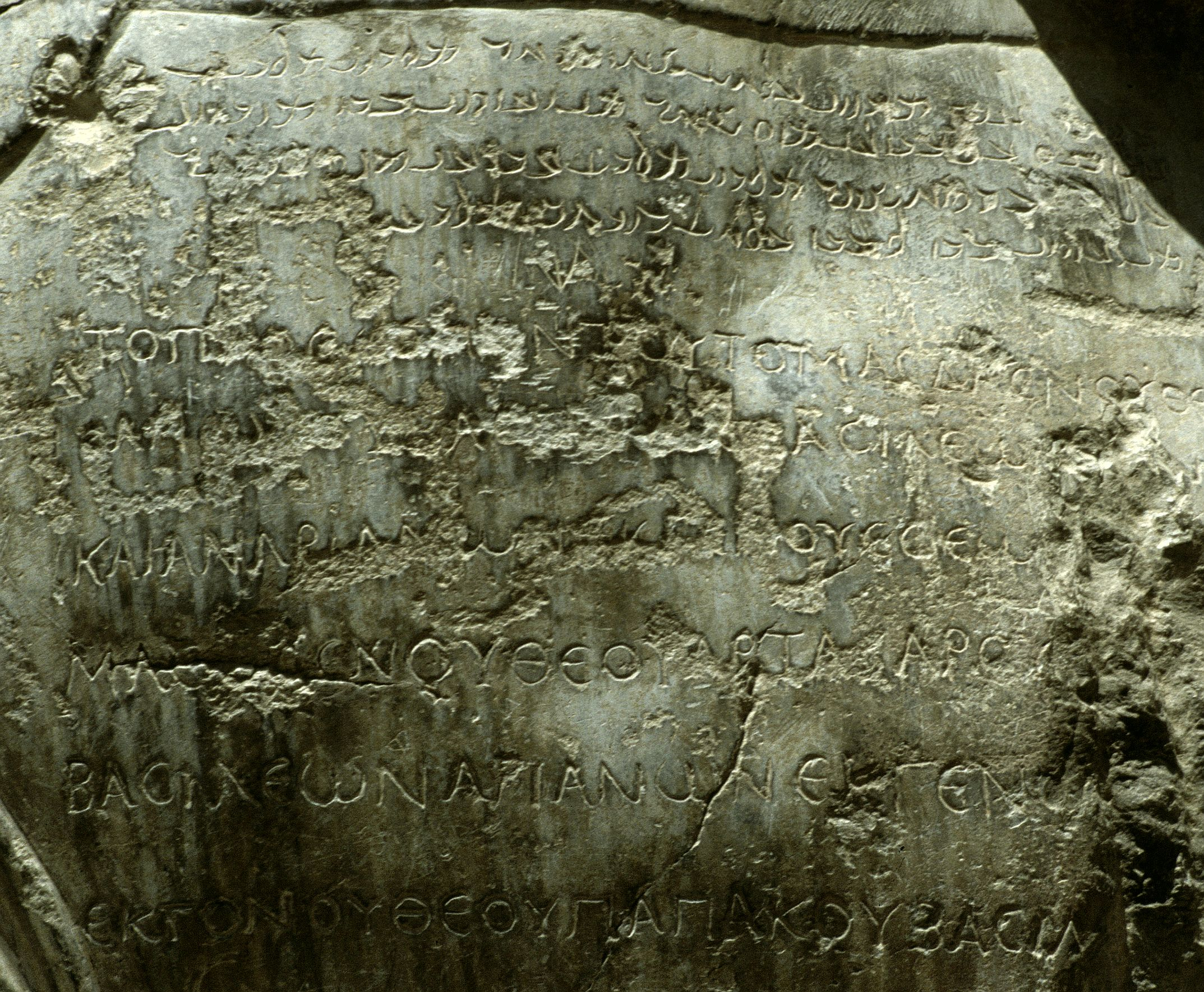
Parthian and Greek inscriptions on a relief of Shapur I.

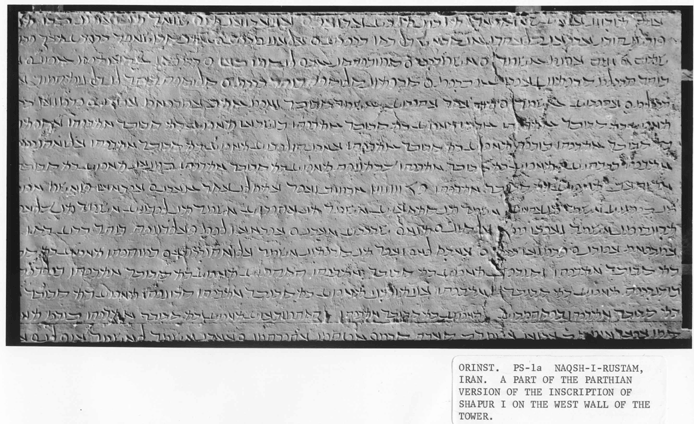
Parthian version of Shapur I's inscription at the Ka'ba-ye Zartosht

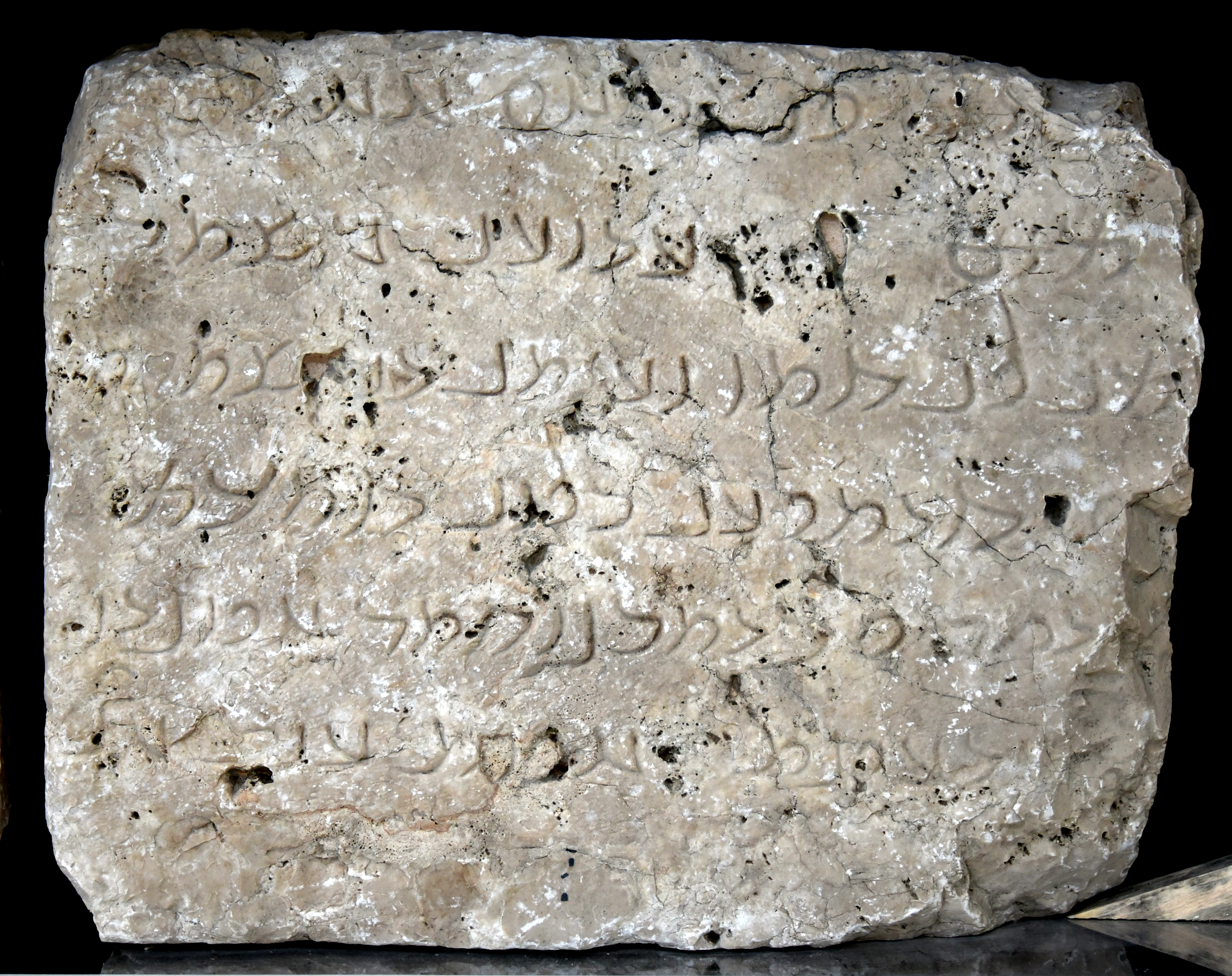
Inscribed stone block from the Paikuli inscription of Narseh, 293 CE

== Letters ==
Inscriptional Parthian uses 22 letters written from right to left, and usually with spaces between words:

Name	Image	Text	Principal phones (IPA; Parthian)	Transliteration
Aleph		𐭀	[a], [aː]	_{ʾ}/A
Beth		𐭁	[b], [w]	b
Gimel		𐭂	[ɡ], [ɣ]	g
Daleth		𐭃	[d], [ð]	d
He		𐭄	—	H
Waw		𐭅	[w], [o(ː)], [u(ː)]	w
Zayin		𐭆	[z], [ʒ]	z
Heth		𐭇	[h], [x]	h/Ḥ
Teth		𐭈	—	Ṭ
Yodh		𐭉	[j], [e(ː)], [i(ː)]	y
Kaph		𐭊	[k], [g]	k
Lamedh		𐭋	[l]	l
Mem		𐭌	[m]	m
Nun		𐭍	[n]	n
Samekh		𐭎	[s]	s
Ayin		𐭏	—	O
Pe		𐭐	[p], [b]	p
Sadhe		𐭑	[t͡ʃ]	ṣ
Qoph		𐭒	—	Q
Resh		𐭓	[r]	r
Shin		𐭔	[ʃ], [ʒ]	š
Taw		𐭕	[t], [d]	t

1. Letter names are based on the corresponding Imperial Aramaic characters

== Ligatures ==
Inscriptional Parthian uses seven standard ligatures:

Ligature		Sequence
Image	Text	Sequence
	𐭂𐭅	𐭂 (gimel) + 𐭅 (waw)
	𐭇𐭅	𐭇 (heth) + 𐭅 (waw)
	𐭉𐭅	𐭉 (yodh) + 𐭅 (waw)
	𐭍𐭅	𐭍 (nun) + 𐭅 (waw)
	𐭏𐭋	𐭏 (ayin) + 𐭋 (lamedh)
	𐭓𐭅	𐭓 (resh) + 𐭅 (waw)
	𐭕𐭅	𐭕 (taw) + 𐭅 (waw)

The letters sadhe (𐭑) and nun (𐭍) have swash tails which typically trail under the following letter.

Ligature		Sequence
Image	Text	Sequence
	𐭍𐭍	𐭍 (nun) + 𐭍 (nun)
	𐭍𐭃	𐭍 (nun) + 𐭃 (daleth)

== Numerals ==
Inscriptional Parthian uses its own numerals:

Value		1	2	3	4	10	20	100	1000
Sign	Image								
Sign	Text	𐭘	𐭙	𐭚	𐭛	𐭜	𐭝	𐭞	𐭟

Numerals are written right-to-left, the rightmost being the highest—with the exception of multiplication. Numerals add when the one to the left is lower or equal but multiply when it is larger.

Examples: 1580 is written as 𐭟𐭞𐭝𐭝𐭜𐭛𐭛 (1000 + 100 + 20 + 20 + 10 + 4 + 4) and 500 is written as 𐭚𐭙𐭞 ((2 + 3 ) × 100).

== Unicode ==
Inscriptional Parthian script was added to the Unicode Standard in October 2009, with the release of version 5.2.

The Unicode block for Inscriptional Parthian is U+10B40–U+10B5F:

Inscriptional Parthian^{[1]}^{[2]} Official Unicode Consortium code chart (PDF)
	0	1	2	3	4	5	6	7	8	9	A	B	C	D	E	F
U+10B4x	𐭀	𐭁	𐭂	𐭃	𐭄	𐭅	𐭆	𐭇	𐭈	𐭉	𐭊	𐭋	𐭌	𐭍	𐭎	𐭏
U+10B5x	𐭐	𐭑	𐭒	𐭓	𐭔	𐭕			𐭘	𐭙	𐭚	𐭛	𐭜	𐭝	𐭞	𐭟
Notes 1.As of Unicode version 18.0 2.Grey areas indicate non-assigned code points

== Gallery ==
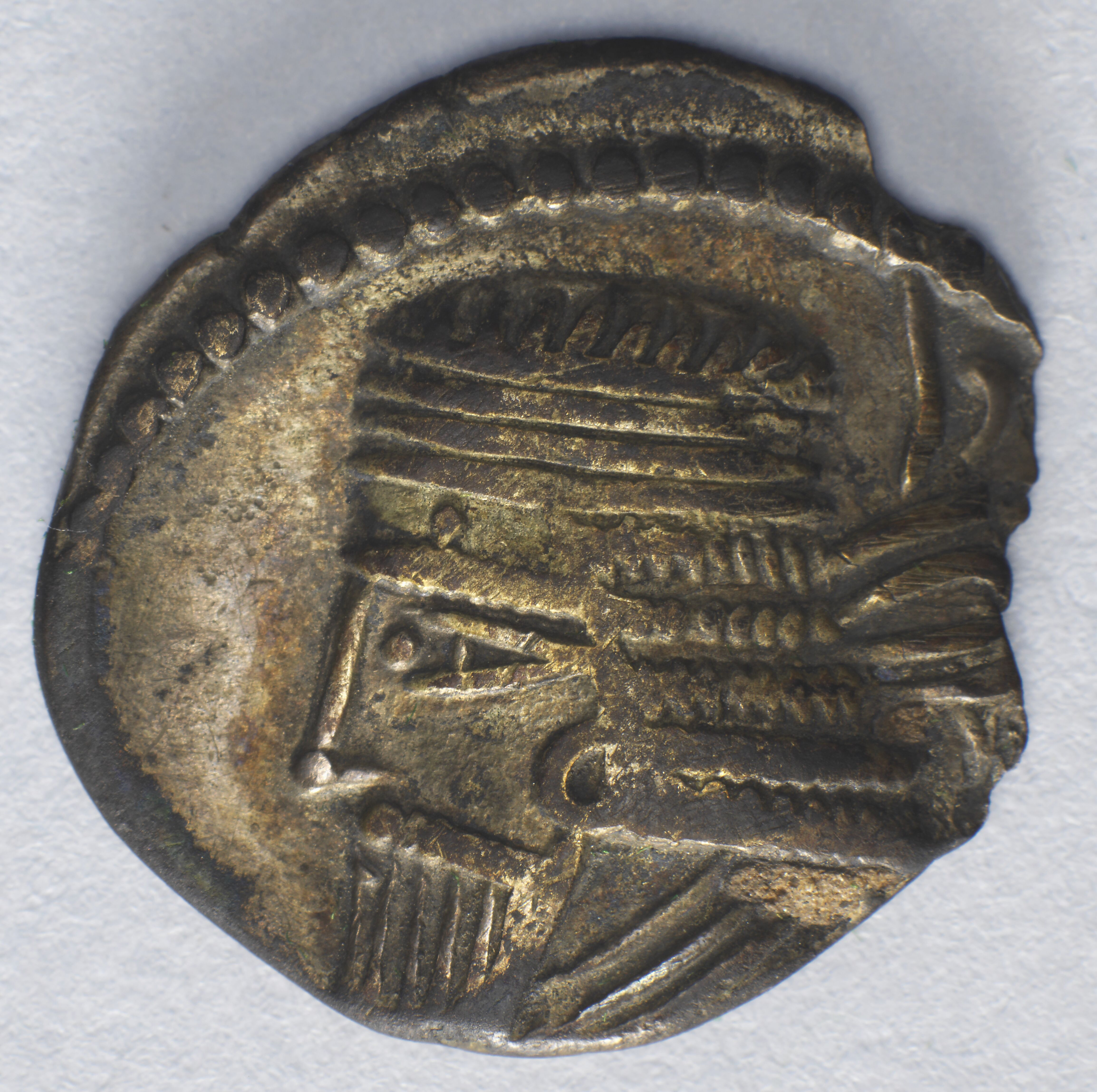
An abbreviation of the Parthian king's name was introduced on their coins by Vologases I. wl can be read behind the head on this coin's obverse side.

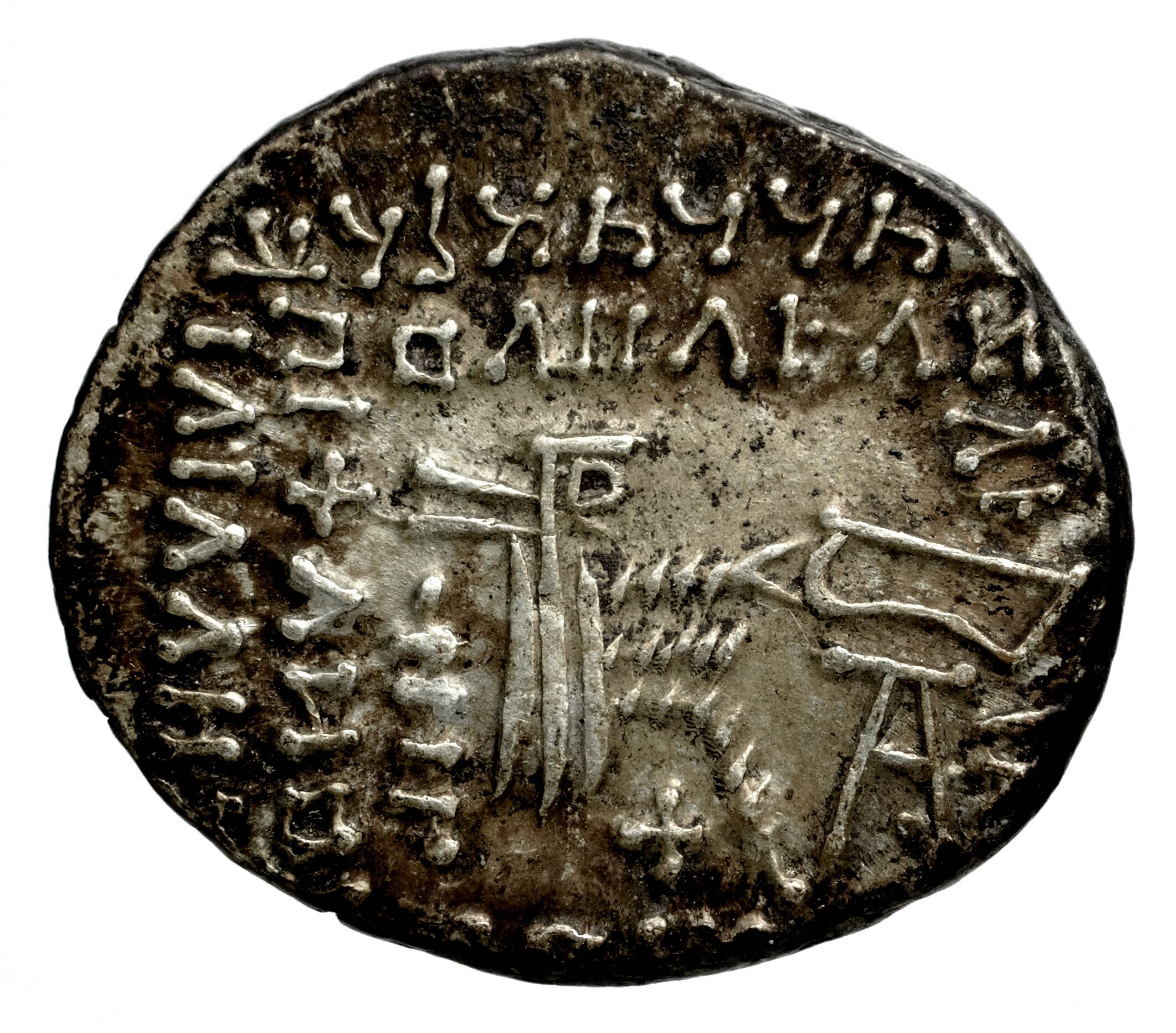
Reverse of a Parthian drahm. The legend at the top reads: [m]trdt MLKA (Note: 𐭌𐭕𐭓𐭃𐭕 𐭌𐭋𐭊𐭀). From Mithridates V on, the ruler's full name and title appeared in Parthian script on drahms, while also becoming increasingly stylized.

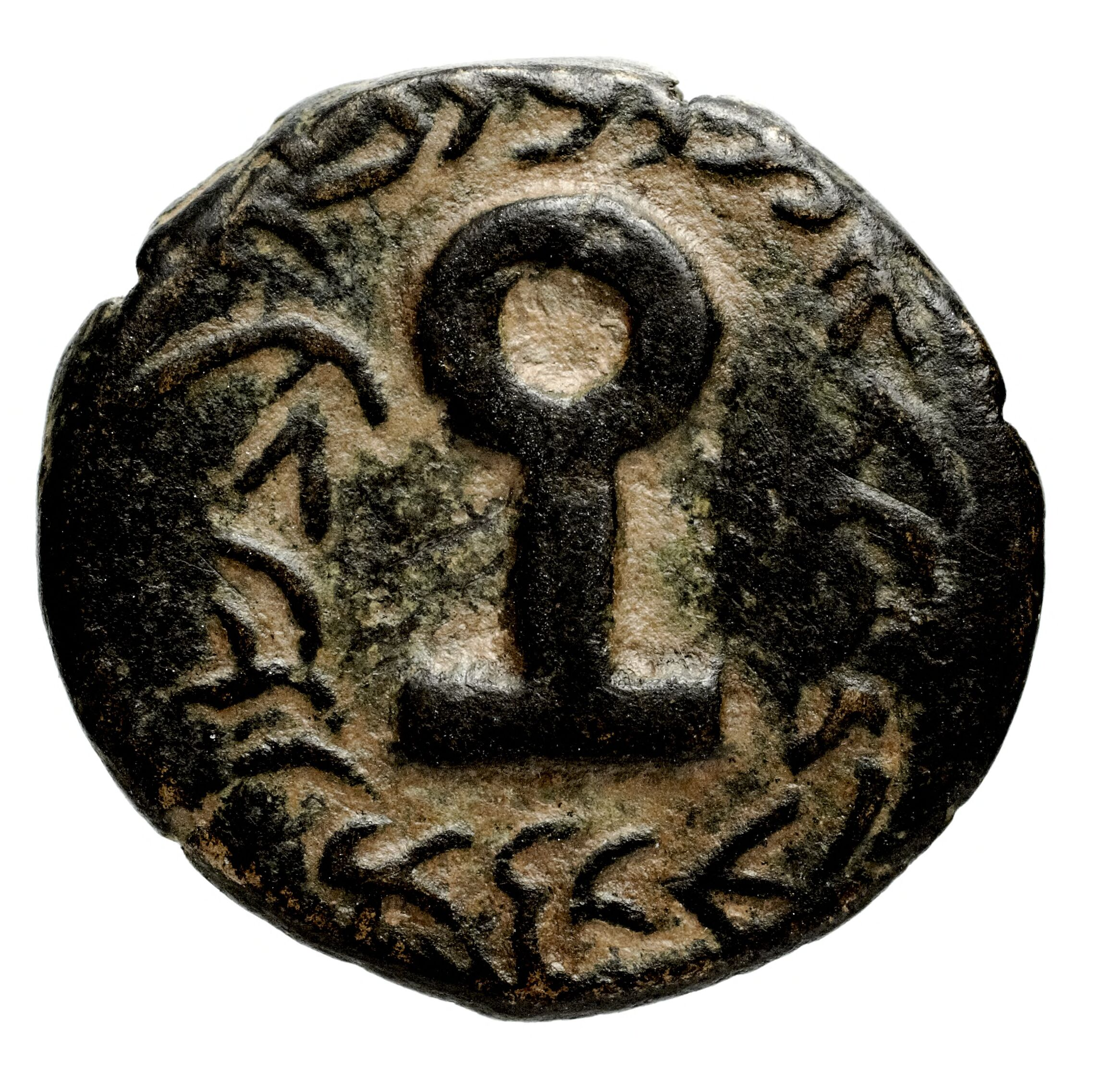
A probably commemorative bronze coin of Vologases IV (ca. 147–191 CE), with the legend ⤸ʾršk ⤹wlgšy ⤺MLKYN ⤻MLKA (Note: 𐭀𐭓𐭔𐭊 𐭅𐭋𐭂𐭔𐭉 𐭌𐭋𐭊𐭉𐭍 𐭌𐭋𐭊𐭀) 'Arsacid Vologases, king of kings'. Minted at Edessa.

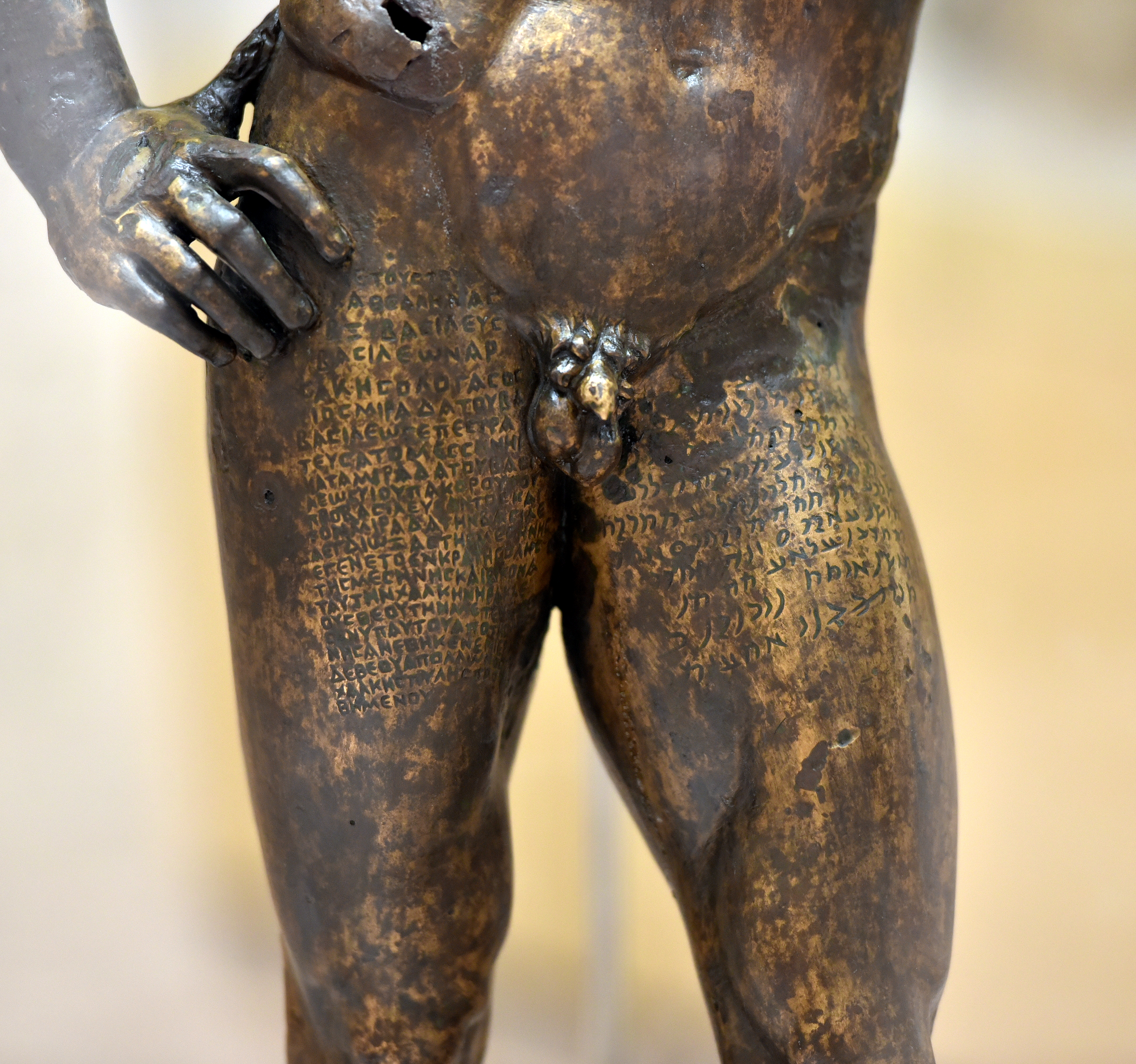
Greek and Parthian on a bronze statuette of Hercules from Seleucia on the Tigris. The inscription dates it to 151 CE. Housed in the Iraq Museum, Baghdad.

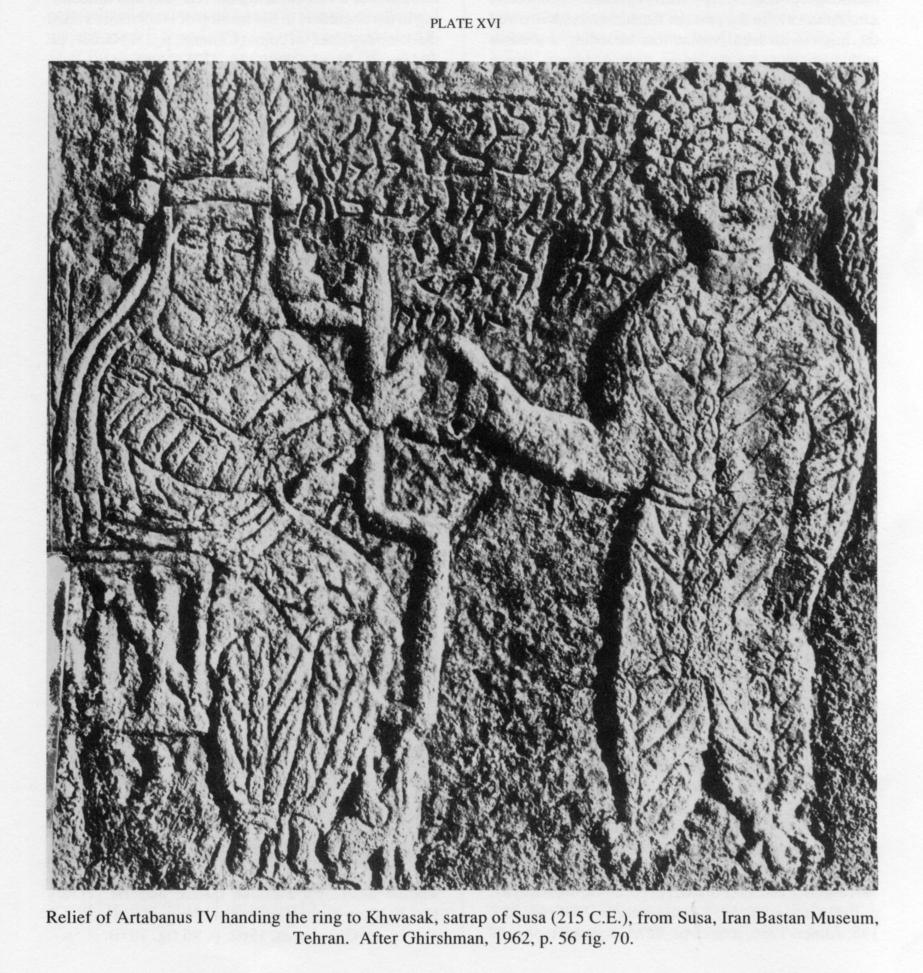
Relief of Artabanus IV handing the ring of power to Khwasak, satrap of Susa. From Susa, Iran Bastan Museum, Tehran, 215 CE

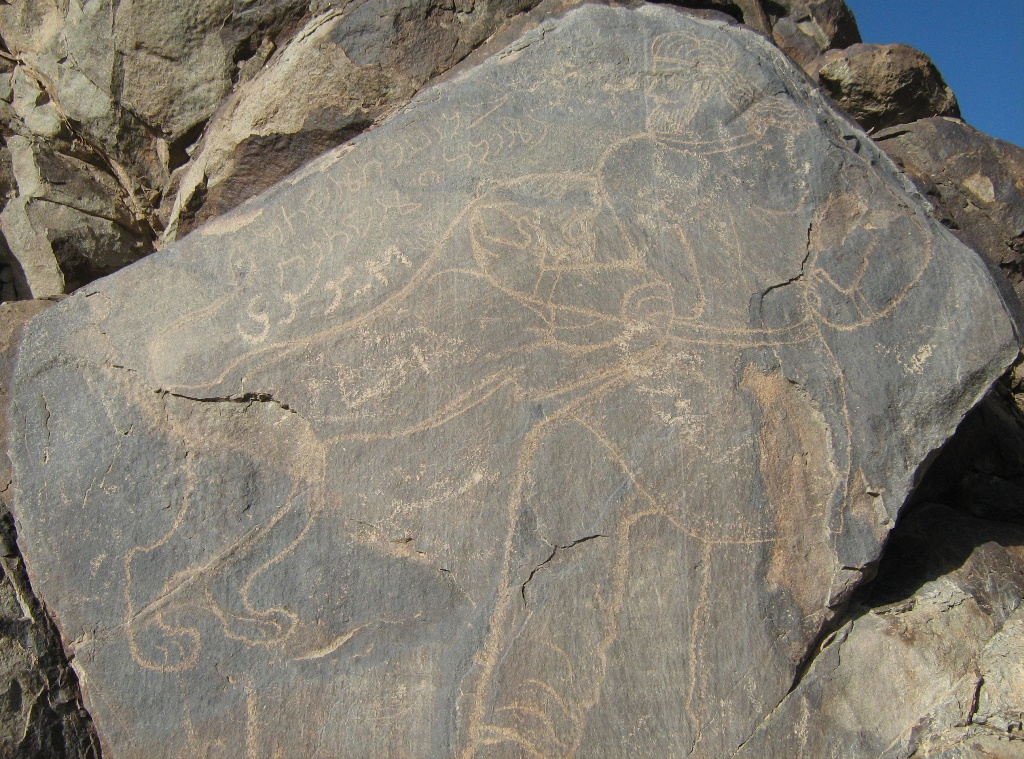
Inscription next to one of the petroglyphs of Kāl-i J̌angāl, a gorge near Birjand. (Note: 𐭂𐭓𐭉𐭀𐭓𐭕𐭇𐭔𐭕𐭓 \ 𐭍𐭇𐭅𐭃𐭓 𐭅 𐭇𐭔𐭕𐭓𐭐 [...] [...] gryʾrtḥštrn / ḥwdr W ḥštrp '[...] the prefect and satrap of Gryʾrtḥštr') Probably of early Sassanian date.

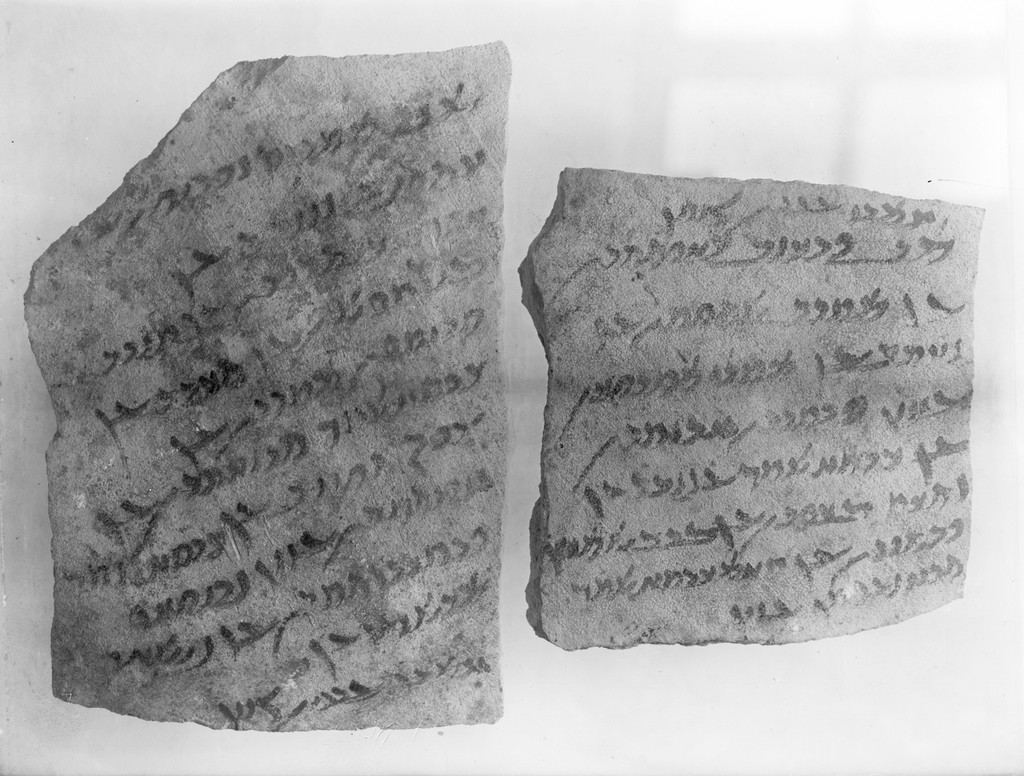
Ostraca from Dura-Europos
