= Zaghawa language =

Nilo-Saharan language spoken in Chad, Libya, and Sudan

Zaghawa
- Beṛia
- "Beria" written in the Beria Erfe script
- Native to: Chad, Sudan
- Region: northeastern Chad, northwestern Sudan
- Ethnicity: Zaghawa, Awlad Mana
- Native speakers: 450,000 (2019–2022)
- Language family: Nilo-Saharan?: Saharan; Eastern; Zaghawa
- Dialects: Bidayat (Tuba); Wagi (Twer); Kube; Dirong; Guruf; Brogat
- Writing system: Beria Erfe script Latin script (Zaghawa alphabet); Arabic script

Language codes
- ISO 639-3: zag
- Glottolog: zagh1240
- Linguasphere: 02-CAA-aa

Linguistic map of the non-Arab peoples of Darfur, showing the extent of the Zaghawa people in Sudan.

Zaghawa (Zaghawa: 𖺡𖺾𖻌𖻂𖺻) is a Nilo-Saharan language spoken by the Zaghawa people of east-central Chad (in the Sahel) and northwestern Sudan (Darfur). The people who speak this language call it Beria, from Beri, the endonym of the Zaghawa people, and a, Zaghawa for "mouth". It has been estimated that there are about 447,400 native speakers of the Zaghawa language, who primarily live in Chad and the Darfur region of Sudan. It is also spoken by a smaller number of people in Libya.

== Dialects ==
Zaghawa clans are:

- Beria (Arabic: Zaghawa)
- Tuba (Arabic: Bideyat): Biria, Brogat
- Kobe (Arabic: Zaghawa): Dirong, Guruf, Kobe, Kapka
- Wegi (Arabic: Twer)

Zaghawa dialects, which do not always correspond to clan divisions, are:

Dialect	Other names	Clans	Population	Major communities	Locations
Tuba	Bideyat (Arabic), Borogat	Biria, Brogat	15,000	Bahaï, Bao Bilia, Kalaït	Chad: canton Kobé-Nord-Est (Iriba s.p.); sub-prefectures Bao Bilia and Kalaït (Ennedi prefecture); Sudan: Northern Dar Fur
Dirong-Guruf	Durong, Gourouf	Dirong, Guruf	4,000	Ebiri, Mardébé, Tronga	Chad: cantons Dirong and Gourouf, and a few villages in Kapka canton (Iriba s.p.)
Kobe	Zaghawa (Arabic), Kobe	Kapka, Kige, Kuba	25,000	Bakaoré (Matadjana), Iriba, Kouba, Tina	Chad: cantons Kapka, Kobé-Nord-Est, Kobé-Nord-Ouest, and Kobé-Sud (Iriba s.p.); Sudan: Northern Dar Fur (near the Chadian border)
Wegi	Twer (Arabic), Artagh, Gala, Wagí	Wegi	100,000	Ambodu, Kornoye, Kutum	Sudan: Northern Dar Fur

== Phonology ==
=== Vowels ===
Zaghawa has a nine-vowel system with advanced-tongue-root vowel harmony. The vowels fall into two sets:

- /i e o u/
- /ɪ ɛ a ɔ ʊ/,

with the vowels of affixes depending on the set of vowels in the stem, and with /a/ functioning in both sets. There is some variation among dialects as to the presence of a tenth vowel, /ə/, which in some dialects functions as the +ATR counterpart of /a/. Diphthongs are /ei əu iə/ and /aɪ aʊ ɔɪ/.

=== Consonants ===
Consonants are simple:

		Labial	Alveolar	Postalveolar	Palatal	Velar	Pharyngeal	Glottal
Stop	voiceless	p	t			k		
Stop	voiced	b	d			g		
Fricative	voiceless	f	s	ʃ			(ħ)	h
Fricative	voiced			(ʒ)				
Nasal		m	n		ɲ	ŋ		
Approximant			l		j	w		
Trill			r					
Tap			ɾ					

Osman also includes /ʒ ħ/ in this list. /ʃ/ occurs primarily in the Sudanese dialect as a variant of /s/ appearing before /i/. The phonemic status of the rhotics are unclear: Osman states that [ɾ r] may be exchanged without any change in meaning, yet maintains that they are distinct phonemes. Of the obstruents, /p/ may not occur word-initially, and only /p t k s/ may occur word-finally, with /b/ in final position in some dialects. /r/ may not occur word-initially, and /f ɾ/ only appear in the middle of words, as in /tòrfù/ 'bird'.

=== Tone ===
There are five tones, high, mid, low, rising, falling, all of which may occur on simple vowels, for example in /ɪ́ɡɪ́/ I watered, /ɪ̌ɡɪ̂/ I said, /ɪ̀ɡɪ̀/ right (direction). Tone distinguishes words, but also has grammatical functions; for example, the plural of many nouns is formed by changing the tone of the final syllable from low to high, and the perfective aspect of many verbs is similarly formed by changing the tone of the final syllable from low to high.

=== Syllable structure ===
Words tend to be short, often CV and CVCV. The most complex syllables are CVC and CRV, where R is either of the two rhotics.

== Orthography ==
The Zaghawa Latin alphabet is as follows:

Zaghawa alphabet
A	B	D	E	F	G	H	I	J	K	L	M	N	Ɲ	Ŋ	O	P	R	S	Sh	T	U	W	Y
a	b	d	e	f	g	h	i	j	k	l	m	n	ɲ	ŋ	o	p	r	s	sh	t	u	w	y
Phonetic value
a	b	d	ɛ	f	g	h, ħ	ɪ	ʒ	k	l	m	n	ɲ	ŋ	ɔ	p	ɾ, r	s	ʃ	t	ʊ	w	j

A macron is used to distinguish the advanced tongue root vowels /i e ə o u/, and IPA tone diacritics are used.

In the 1950s, a Zaghawa schoolteacher named Adam Tajir created an alphabet for the Zaghawa language that was based on the clan identification marks (brands). Sometimes known as the camel alphabet, he based the phoneme choice on the Arabic language rather than on Zaghawa. Also, some of the marks were longer than others, which made it harder to use it as a computer font.

In 2000, a Beri veterinarian named Siddick Adam Issa prepared an improved version of the alphabet which is named Beria Giray Erfe (Beria Writing Marks). In 2007, this system of writing was turned into a computer font by Seonil Yun in cooperation with SIL International and the Mission Protestante Franco-Suisse au Tchad.

There is also an Arabic script alphabet under development, based on the Tijani system of writing African languages in the 13th century.
