= Kpelle syllabary =

Writing system

Kpelle
- Script type: syllabary
- Period: 1935–?
- Direction: Left-to-right
- Languages: Kpelle language

ISO 15924
- ISO 15924: Kpel (436), Kpelle

The Kpelle syllabary was invented c. 1935 by Chief Gbili of Sanoyie, Liberia. It was intended for writing the Kpelle language, a member of the Mande group of Niger-Congo languages spoken by about 490,000 people in Liberia and around 300,000 people in Guinea at that time.

According to Omniglot, the syllabary consists of 88 graphemes. The Unicode proposal consists of 106 non-numerical symbols. The script is written from left-to-right in horizontal rows. Many of the character have allographs.

The script has 10 known numerals, they go from one to ten, there is no known character for zero.

It was used to some extent by speakers of the Kpelle language in Liberia and Guinea during the 1930s and early 1940s but never achieved popular acceptance. It has been classed as a failed script.

Today Kpelle is written with a version of the Latin alphabet.
