= Sui script =

Logographic writing system

Sui script Shuishu
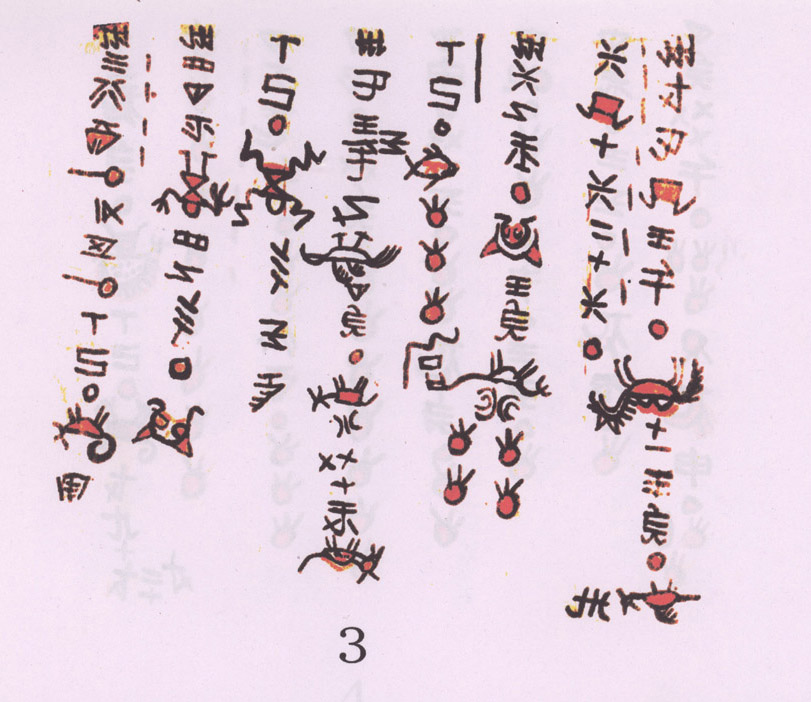
- Script type: Logographic
- Period: Unknown — present
- Direction: Top-to-bottom, columns right to left
- Languages: Sui language

ISO 15924
- ISO 15924: Shui (530), Shuishu

Unicode
- Unicode range: U+1B300 to U+1B4FF

The Sui script (Sui: le1 sui3, Simplified Chinese: 水书, Traditional Chinese: 水書, Pinyin: Shuǐshū) or Shuishu, is a logographic writing system with some pictographic characters that is used to write the Sui language (Wei 2003:xxix). However, traditionally only shamans were familiar with the writing system, and it is not utilized for everyday use by ordinary Sui people. This system is used for geomancy and divination purposes. There are at least 500 different Sui characters, known as le1 sui3 in the Sui language (Wei 2003:xxix). According to tradition, these characters were created by ljok8 to2 qong5 (Chinese: Lù Duógōng 陸鐸公). Some of these characters are pictorial representations, such as of a bird or a fish, and a few are schematic representations of a characteristic quality, such a snail represented by a drawing of an inward curving spiral. Many of these characters appear to be borrowings from Chinese characters and are written backwards, apparently for increased supernatural power.

== History ==
It has been proposed by some that the Sui script bear somewhat similarities to the Xia Tao symbols in the Erlitou site, Yanshi, Henan. The Sui script can be used to roughly interpret its meaning, which has attracted the attention of the archaeological community. Furthermore, the possibility has risen that the ancestors of the Sui people originally came from more to the north or that the Xia Tao symbols influenced the Sui script.

The Sui script is in acute danger of extinction, although the Chinese government is currently attempting to preserve it. In 2006, Shuishu was placed on the Chinese intangible cultural heritage list.

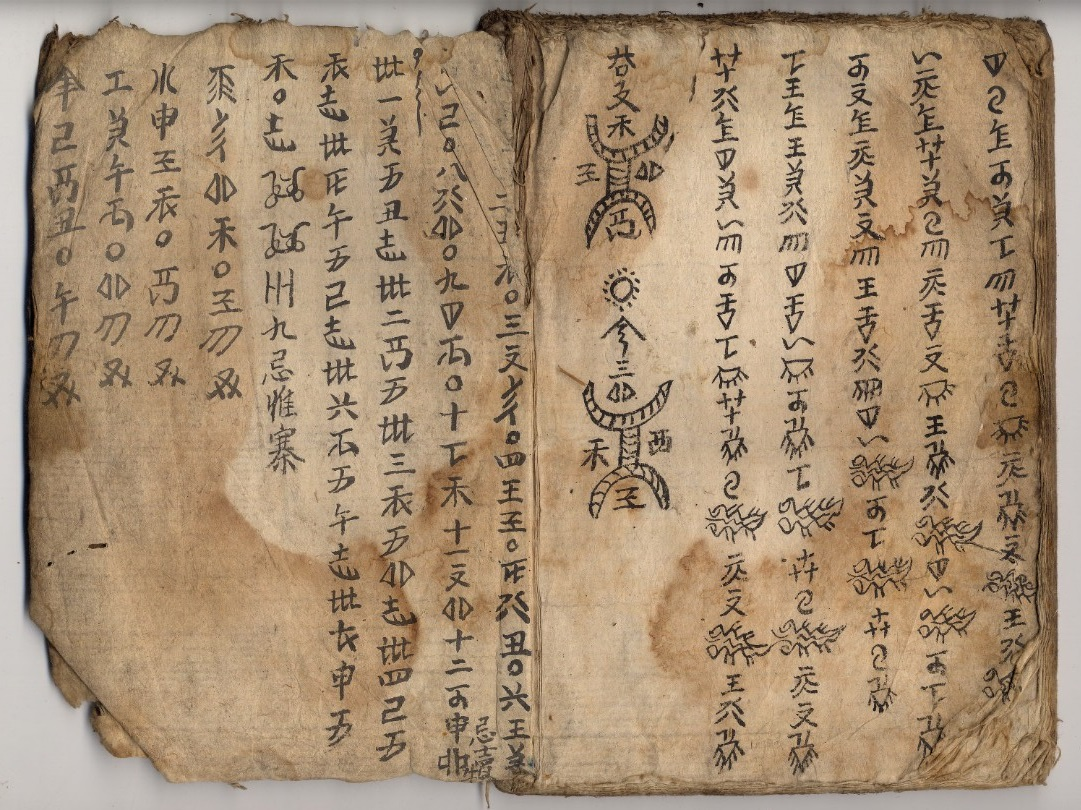
19th-century Shuishu manuscript from the Shui archives in Libo, Guizhou

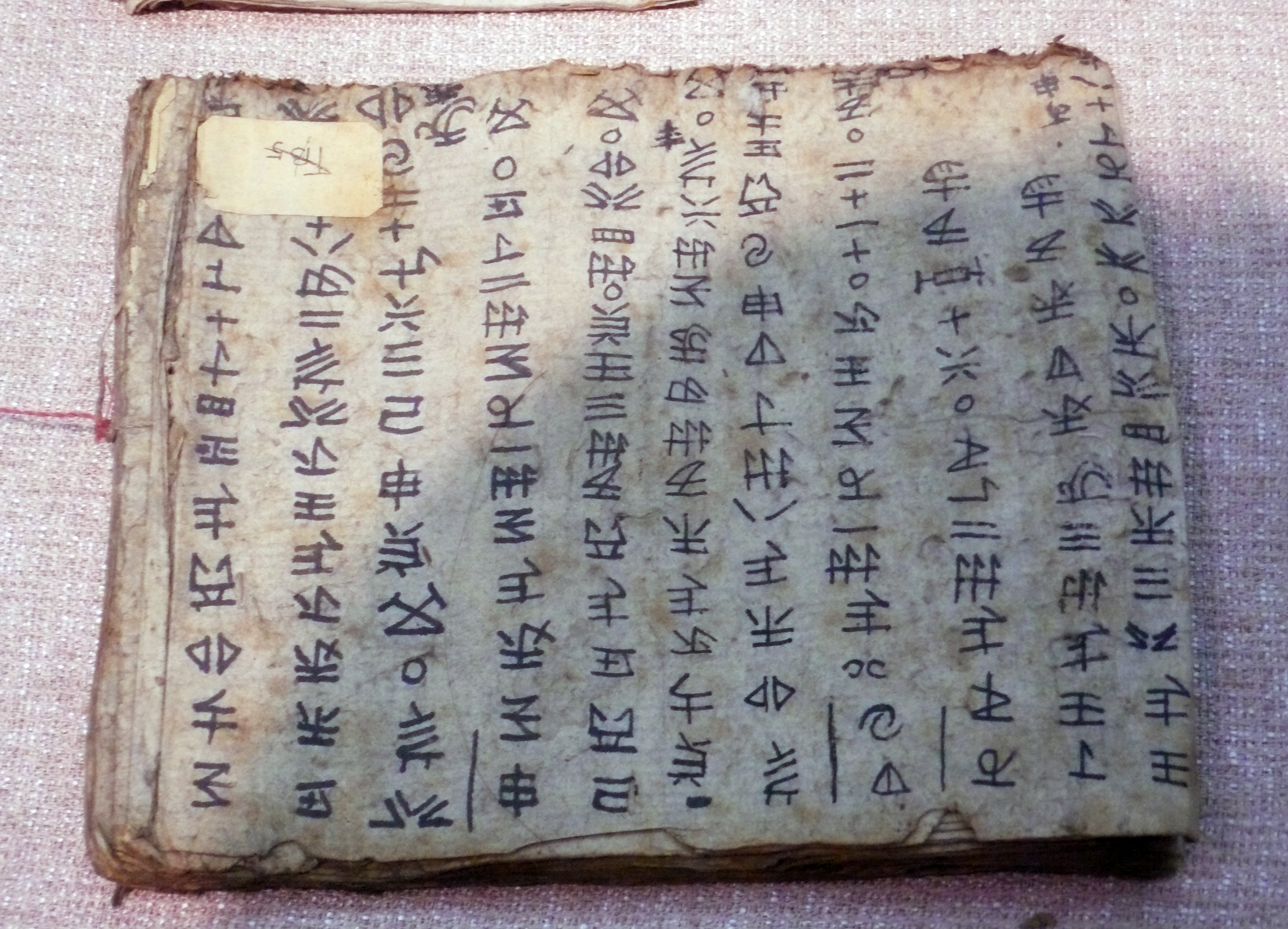
Manuscript in Sui script

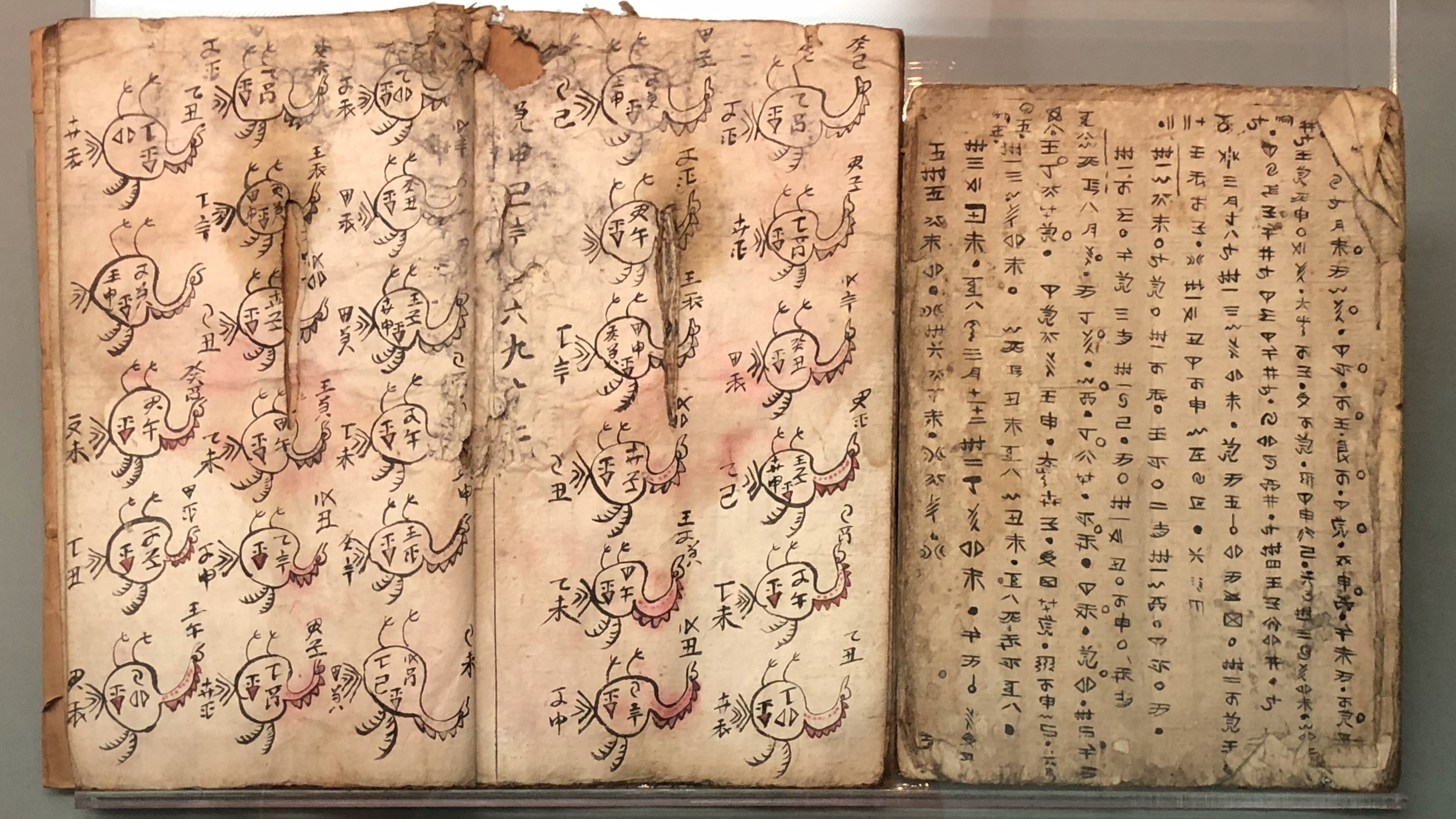
Manuscript in Sui script

== Characteristics ==
The Sui script was handed down from generation to generation, and its shape is similar to the Oracle bone script and the Bronze script. It is mainly used to record cultural information such as astronomy, geography, religion, folklore, ethics, philosophy and other cultural information. The Sui script is not phonetic and one needs special knowledge to interpret a text.

The script is written mostly vertically downward and from right to left, and does not employ punctuation. The script cannot fully represent the Sui language.

=== Characters ===
The Sui script contains three types of characters: Chinese variants, primitive pictographs and abstract symbols. Each character expresses a concept and stands for a syllable. The characters can be classified in three categories: logographs, dubbing characters and prompting characters. About half of the Sui characters are derived from mirrored, upside-down or slightly twisted Chinese characters. The other half of the characters are original creations and some are primitive pictographs. Lastly, dubbing characters supplement syllables in a sentence, while prompting characters indicate that the reader should read or sing the sentence aloud.

== Unicode ==
As of 2018, discussion on Sui script integration into Unicode were ongoing.
