= List of Sasanian inscriptions =

This is a list of Sasanian inscriptions, which include remaining official inscriptions on rocks, as well as minor ones written on bricks, metal, wood, hide, papyri, and gems. Their significance is in the areas of linguistics, history, and study of religion in Persia. Some of the inscriptions are lost and are known only through tradition.

== List of Sasanian inscriptions ==
Early royal Sasanian inscriptions were trilingual: Middle Persian (in Inscriptional Pahlavi), Parthian (in Inscriptional Parthian) and Greek. Since the rule of Narseh, Greek was omitted. Book Pahlavi script replaced Inscriptional Pahlavi in late Middle Persian inscriptions.

Sasanian inscriptions
Photo	Name	Dedicated/attributed to	Location	Language(s)	Notes	Source
Inscriptional Parthian, Greek, and Pahlavi	Investiture of Ardashir I (KNRm)	Ardashir I	Naqsh-e Rostam, Fars	Persian, Parthian, Greek		
	Nasrabad fire altar (ABD)	Shapur I	From Nasrabad, Fars	Persian?	Dating to after 243/4	
	Dura-Europos (scratched and ink 'dipinti') inscriptions	Shapur I	Dura-Europos, Syria	Persian, Parthian	211/212 (Parthian), 252–253 (Persian)	
	Shapur I's victory relief at Naqsh-e Rostam (BŠm)	Shapur I	Naqsh-e Rostam	Persian		
Inscriptional Parthian, Greek, and Pahlavi	Šābuhr I's inscription at the Kaʿba-ye Zardošt (ŠKZ, RGDS?)	Šābuhr I	Kaʿba-ye Zardošt, Naqš-e Rostam	Persian?, Parthian?, Greek?	Dating to 260–262	
	Shapur I's inscription at Naqsh-e Rostam	Shapur I	Naqsh-e Rostam	Persian, Parthian, Greek	Only part of the Greek inscriptions remains	
	Shapur I inscription in Hajiabad	Shapur I	Hajiabad, near Istakhr	Persian, Parthian		
	Shapur I inscription in Naqsh-e Rajab (ŠNRb)	Shapur I	Naqsh-e Rajab	Persian, Parthian, Greek		
	Kartir's inscription at Sar Mashhad (KSM)	Kartir	Sar Mashhad	Persian		
Inscriptional Pahlavi and Parthian	Inscription of Apasa the Scribe? (ŠVŠ)	Šābuhr I	Bīšāpūr	Persian?, Parthian?		
	Kartir's inscription at Naghsh-e Rajab (KNRb)	Kartir	Naqsh-e Rajab	Persian		
Inscriptional Pahlavi Inscriptional Parthian	Paikuli inscription (NPi)	Narseh	Barkal village, Sulaymaniyah Governorate, Iraq	Persian, Parthian		
Inscriptional Pahlavi	Inscription of Narseh at Bishapur	Narseh (formerly Bahram I)				
	Inscription of Shapur Sakanshah	Shapur Sakanshah	Tachara Palace, Persepolis, Fars	Persian		
	Sasanian inscription in Meshginshahr (ŠMŠ, MeSh)	Shapur II	Near Meshginshahr	Persian		
Inscriptional Pahlavi	Inscription of Shapur II and Shapur III at Taq-e Bostan (ŠTBn-I & II)	Shapur II	Taq-e Bostan	Persian		
Inscriptional Pahlavi	Inscription of Shapur II and Shapur III at Taq-e Bostan (ŠTBn-I & II)	Shapur III	Taq-e Bostan	Persian		
	Inscription in the fire-temple of Abruwan	Mihr-Narseh	Abruwan		Lost; attested in al-Istakhri's work	
	Inscription on Gor's bridge (MNFd)	Mihr-Narseh	Gor, Fars	Persian		
	Bandian complex inscriptions	Peroz I /Kavad I	Bandian complex	Persian?		
	Darband fortification inscriptions	Ḵosrow I; Dariuš (āmārgar); Mōšīg, Ādurgušnasp, and Rašn (architects); unknowns	Darband	Persian	Mid-6th century	
	Darab Inscription		Zarindasht, Darab	Persian	Discovered in 2020	
	Sasanian relief discovered in England			None	Early 3rd century?	

== See also ==
- Sasanian rock reliefs
