= Behnam =

- Pronunciation: Bih'nɑ:m
- Gender: masculine

Origin
- Origin: Persian
- Meaning: Honorable, distinguished, reputable, acclaimed
- Region of origin: Persia

Behnam (Persian: بهنام) is an Iranian / Persian masculine given name or family name, which translates as "distinguished, honorable, reputable, or acclaimed".

The name is composed of two parts: bih (به, meaning "good" or "best") and nâm (نام, meaning "name or reputation").

The given name and surname is also found with Assyrian people, from the name of the Christian martyr Mar Behnam. There exists a famous monastery of Saint Behnam in north Iraq. It is also a Hebrew translation of "Shem Tov" meaning "noble" in Hebrew.

== Given name ==
- Behnam (saint), a 4th century Christian martyr
- Behnam Abolghasempour (born 1973), Iranian football player
- Behnam Abu Alsoof (1931–2012), Iraqi Assyriologist, anthropologist, historian and writer
- Behnam Afas (born 1934), Iraqi-New Zealander author and researcher
- Behnam Afsheh (born 1983), Iranian footballer
- Behnam Asbaghi (born 1986), Iranian taekwondo practitioner
- Behnam Barzay (born 1993), Iranian footballer
- Behnam Behzadi (born 1972), Iranian director, screenwriter, editor and producer
- Behnam Beyranvand, Iranian footballer
- Behnam Ehsanpour (born 1992), Iranian wrestler
- Behnam Khosroshahi (born 1989), Iranian cyclist
- Behnam Mahmoudi (born 1980), Iranian volleyball player
- Behnam Malakooti, American professor
- Behnam Maleki (born 1992), Iranian cyclist
- Behnam Sadeghi (born 1969), scholar of Islamic law and history
- Behnam Seraj (born 1971), Iranian football player and manager
- Behnam Taebi (born 1977), Dutch-Iranian ethicist and academician
- Behnam Tashakkor (born 1977), Iraqi actor
- Behnam Tayyebi (born 1975), Iranian wrestler
- Behnam Yakhchali (born 1995), Iranian basketball player

== Surname ==
- Farjam Behnam (born 1966), Iranian editor and researcher
- Jamshid Behnam (1928–2021), Iranian sociologist, writer and translator
- Mariam Behnam (1921–2014), Iranian-born Emirati writer, diplomat and activist
- Rostin Behnam, American lawyer and government official

== See also ==
- Behnam House, a historical building in Tabriz, Iran
