= Inscriptional Pahlavi =

Earliest attested form of Pahlavi scripts

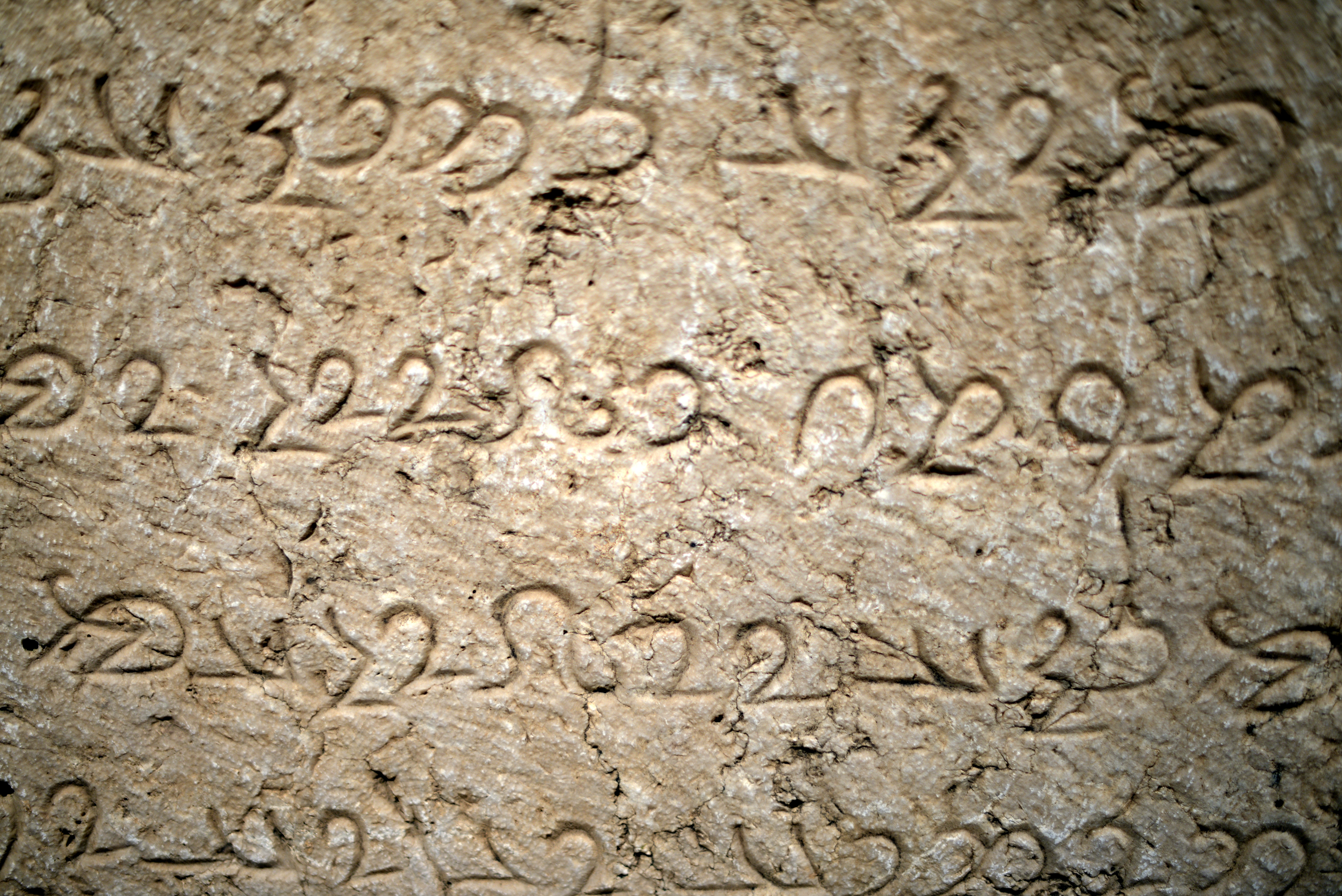
- Inscribed stone block from the c. 293 CE Paikuli inscription
- Script type: Abjad
- Period: 2nd century BC — 6th century AD
- Direction: Right-to-left script
- Languages: Middle Iranian languages

Related scripts
- Parent systems: Aramaic alphabet: Pahlavi scripts; Inscriptional Pahlavi

ISO 15924
- ISO 15924: Phli (131), Inscriptional Pahlavi

Unicode
- Unicode alias: Inscriptional Pahlavi
- Unicode range: U+10B60–U+10B7F

Inscriptional Pahlavi is the earliest attested form of Pahlavi scripts, and is evident in clay fragments that have been dated to the reign of Mithridates I (r. 171–138 BC). Other early evidence includes the Pahlavi inscriptions of Parthian coins and the rock inscriptions of Sasanian emperors and other notables, such as Kartir the High Priest.

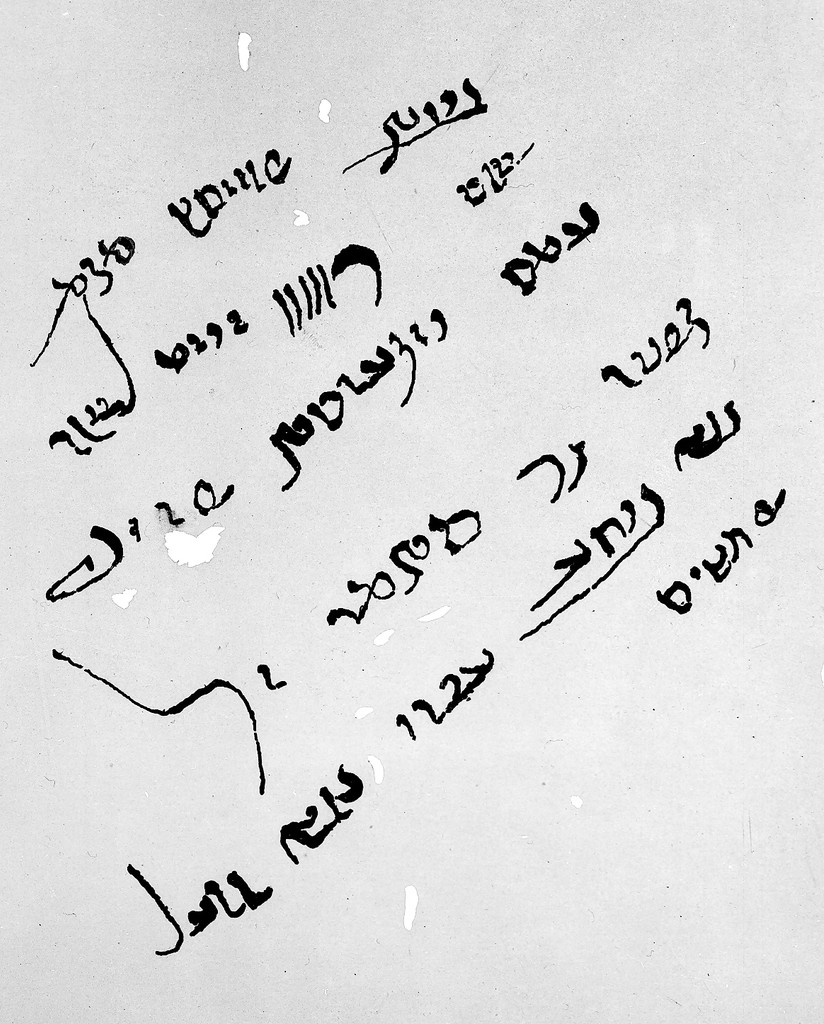
Reproduction of one of the painted inscriptions (no. 42) from the walls of the Dura-Europos synagogue, presumed to date to the 15th regnal year of the unnamed Šāpūr I (240–70 CE):
1. 𐭡𐭩𐭥𐭧 𐭯𐭥𐭥𐭥𐭲𐭩𐭭 𐭬𐭣𐭬
  BYRḤ prwrtyn QDM
2. 𐭱𐭭𐭲 𐭼𐭺𐭹 𐭥𐭩𐭥𐭬 𐭫𐭱𐭭𐭩
  ŠNT X III II WYWM lšny
3. 𐭠𐭬𐭲 𐭩𐭦𐭣𐭠𐭭𐭲𐭧𐭬𐭯𐭥𐭭𐭡𐭢𐭢
  ʾMT yzdʾntḥ[m]pr[n]b(g)
4. 𐭣𐭯𐭩𐭥𐭥 𐭦𐭩 𐭲𐭧𐭬𐭩 𐭥𐭫
  dpywr ZY tḥmy ʿL
5. 𐭦𐭭𐭤 𐭡𐭩𐭲𐭠 𐭩𐭠𐭲𐭥𐭭𐭲 𐭠𐭯𐭱 𐭦𐭭𐭤 𐭭𐭪𐭠𐭫
  ZNH BYTʾ [YʾTWNt] ʾPš ZNH nkʾl
6. 𐭯𐭮𐭭𐭣𐭩𐭲
  ps(nd)yt
"(It was the 1st) month of Frawardīn in the year 15 and the (18th) day Rashn when the scribe Yazdān-tahm-farrbay, the strong, [came] to this house, and he liked this picture."

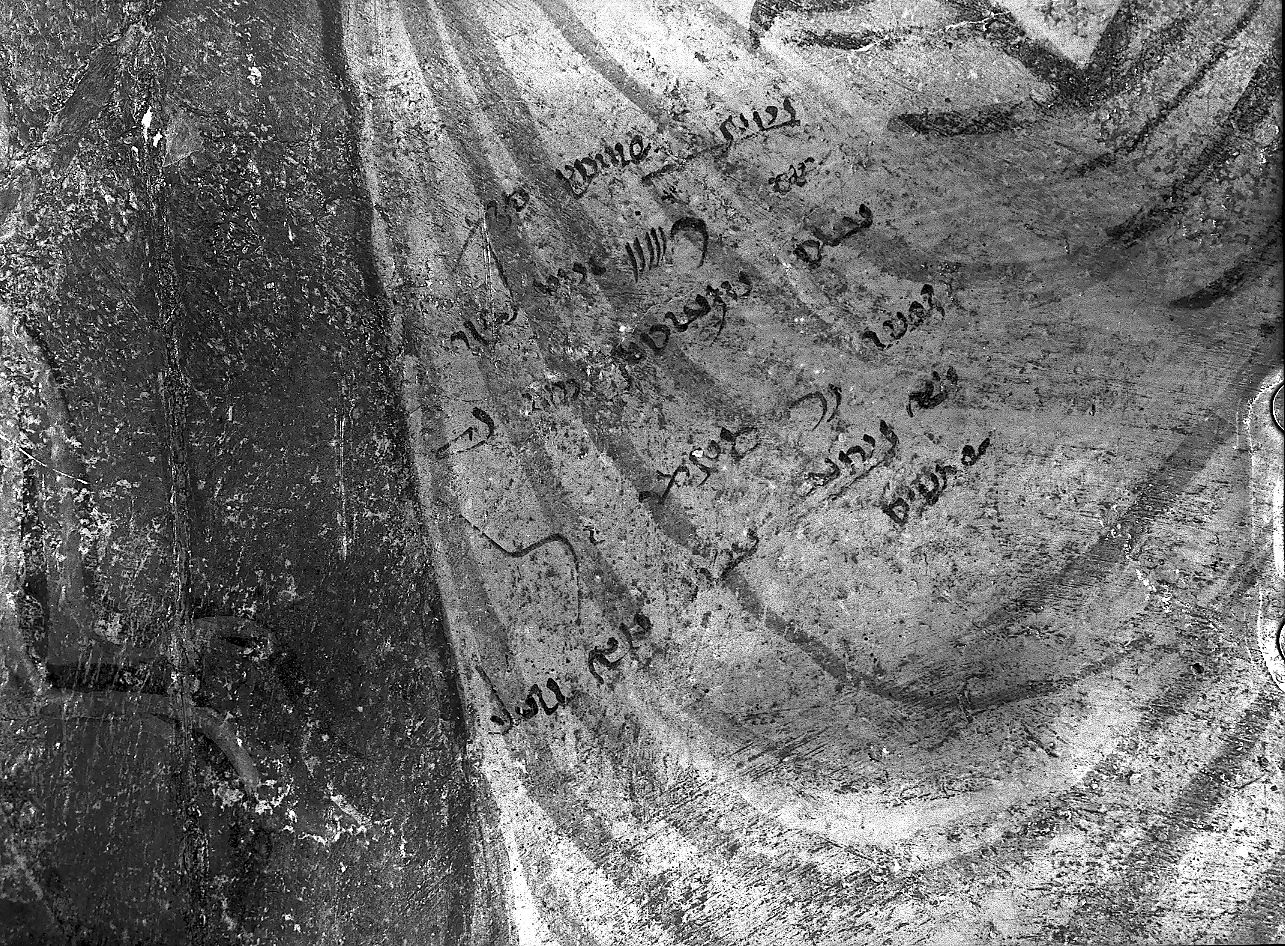
Photo showing the writing in context, written over a figure's himation

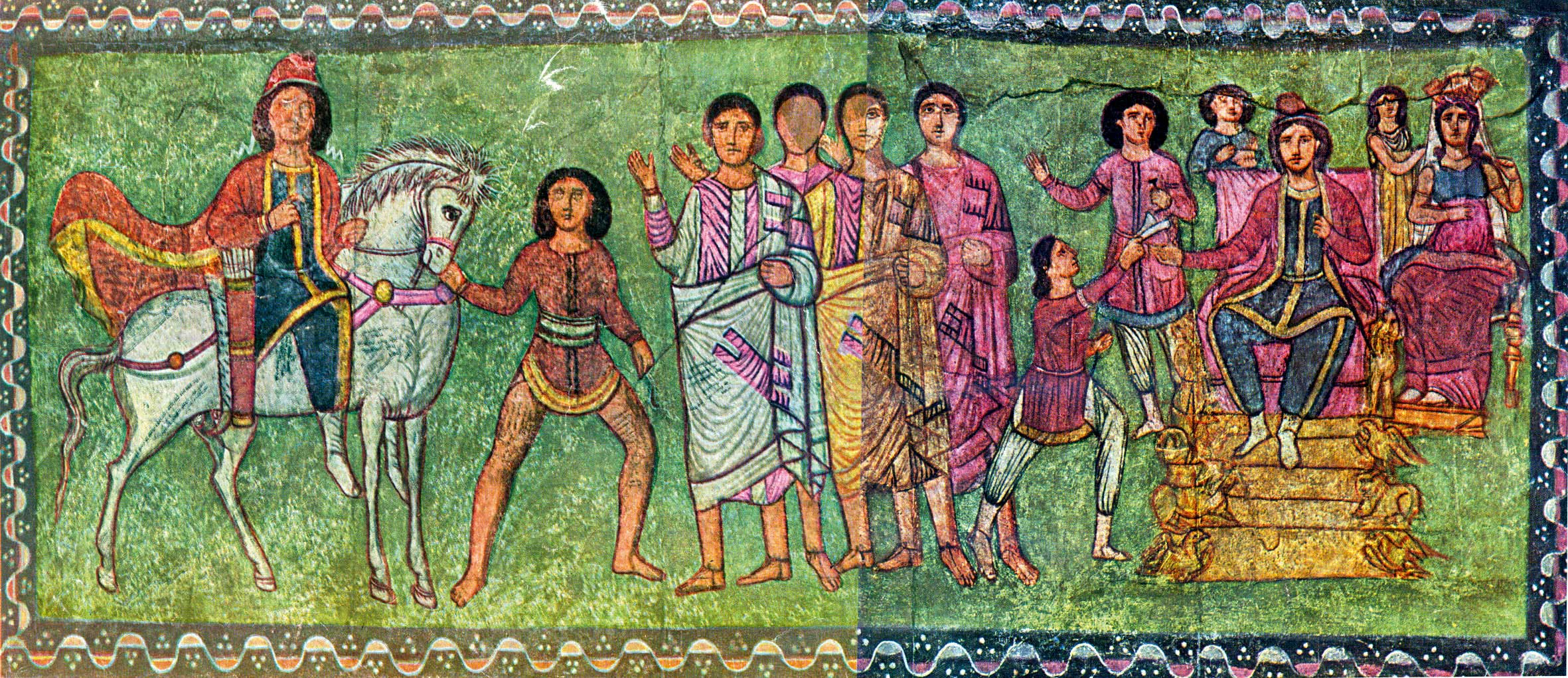
Full panel with additional inscriptions

== Letters ==
Inscriptional Pahlavi used 19 non-joining letters written from right to left, and usually with spaces between words:

Name	Image	Text	Principal phones (IPA; Middle Persian)	Transliteration	
Name	Image	Text	Principal phones (IPA; Middle Persian)	Iranian	Semitic (Aramaic)
Aleph		𐭠	[a], [aː]	ʼ or ʾ	A
Beth		𐭡	[b], [w]	b	B
Gimel		𐭢	[ɡ], [j]	g	G
Daleth		𐭣	[d], [j]	d	D
He		𐭤	—		-H, E
Waw-		𐭥	[w], [o(ː)], [u(ː)]	w	W
-Ayin-		𐭥	[∅]		O
-Resh		𐭥	[r]	r	R
Zayin		𐭦	[z]	z	Z
Heth		𐭧	[h], [x]	h	Ḥ
Teth		𐭨	—		Ṭ
Yodh		𐭩	[j], [e(ː)], [i(ː)], [d̠͡ʒ]	y, j-	Y
Kaph		𐭪	[k], [ɡ]	k	K
Lamedh		𐭫	[l], [r]	l	L
Mem-		𐭬	[m]	m	M
-Qoph		𐭬	—		Q
Nun		𐭭	[n]	n	N
Samekh		𐭮	[s], [h]	s	S
Pe		𐭯	[p], [b], [f]	p	P
Sadhe		𐭰	[t̠͡ʃ], [d̠͡ʒ], [z]	ṣ	Ṣ
Shin		𐭱	[ʃ]	š	Š
Taw		𐭲	[t], [d]	t	T

1. Letter names are based on the corresponding Imperial Aramaic characters.
2. 𐭫 is used for [r] more often than 𐭥.

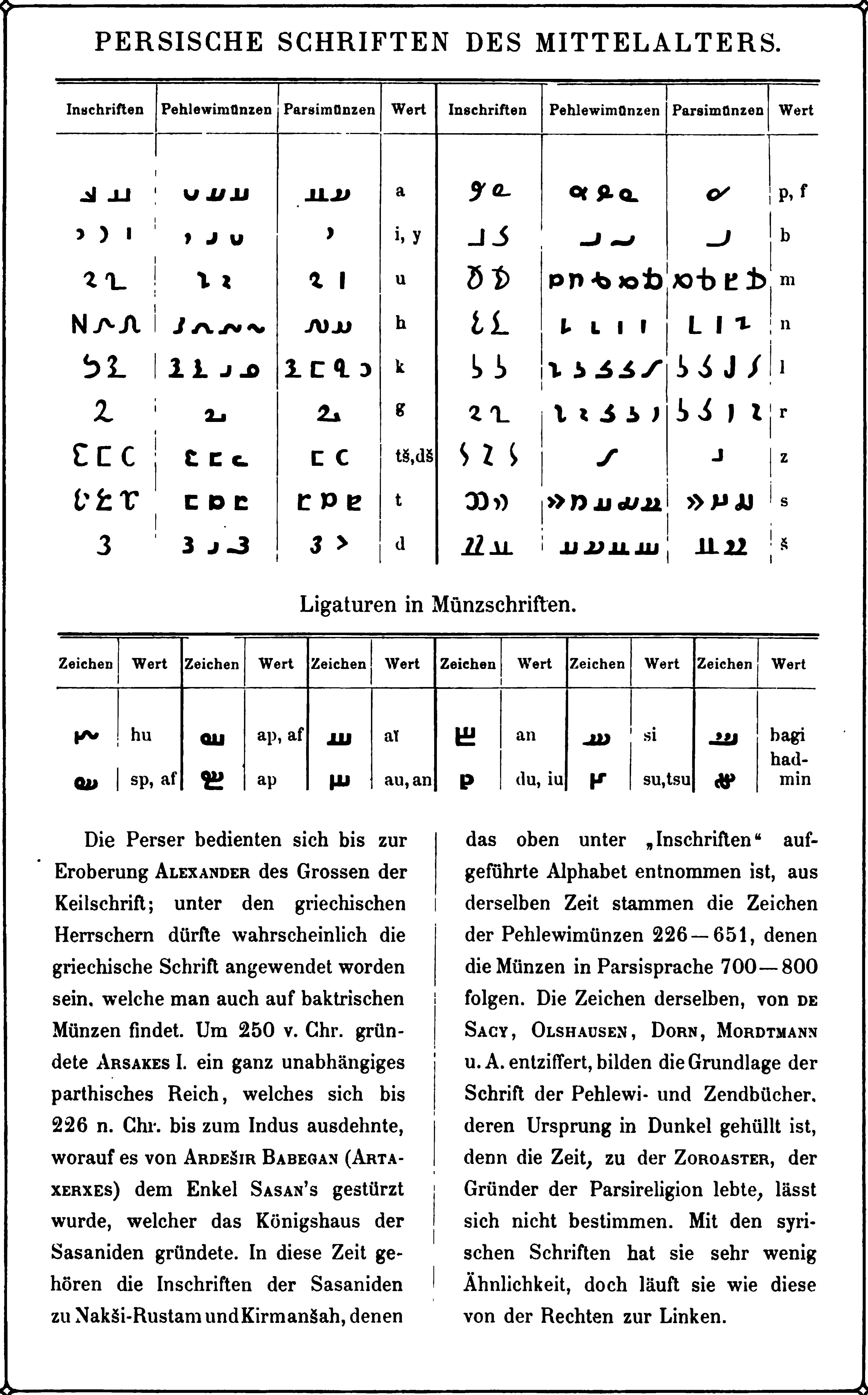
Different letterforms from inscriptions and coins (Sasanian, later coins, and coin ligatures)

== Numbers ==
Inscriptional Pahlavi had its own numerals:

Value		1	2	3	4	10	20	100	1000
Sign	Image								
Sign	Text	𐭸	𐭹	𐭺	𐭻	𐭼	𐭽	𐭾	𐭿

Numerals are written right-to-left, the rightmost being the highest—with the exception of multiplication. Numerals add when the one to the left is lower or equal but multiply when it is larger.

Example: 6798 is written as 𐭺𐭺𐭿𐭻𐭺𐭾𐭽𐭽𐭽𐭽𐭼𐭻𐭻 ((3 + 3) × 1000 + (4 + 3) × 100 + 20 + 20 + 20 + 20 +10 + 4 + 4).

== Unicode ==
Inscriptional Pahlavi script was added to the Unicode Standard in October, 2009 with the release of version 5.2.

The Unicode block for Inscriptional Pahlavi is U+10B60–U+10B7F:

Inscriptional Pahlavi^{[1]}^{[2]} Official Unicode Consortium code chart (PDF)
	0	1	2	3	4	5	6	7	8	9	A	B	C	D	E	F
U+10B6x	𐭠	𐭡	𐭢	𐭣	𐭤	𐭥	𐭦	𐭧	𐭨	𐭩	𐭪	𐭫	𐭬	𐭭	𐭮	𐭯
U+10B7x	𐭰	𐭱	𐭲						𐭸	𐭹	𐭺	𐭻	𐭼	𐭽	𐭾	𐭿
Notes 1.As of Unicode version 18.0 2.Grey areas indicate non-assigned code points

== Gallery ==
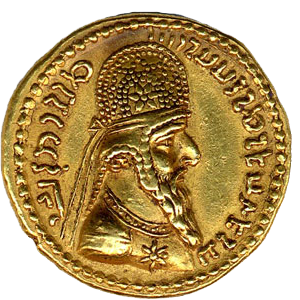
Sasanian coin (dinar) of Ardashir I (r. 224–42) inscribed: ⤹ 𐭬𐭦𐭣𐭩𐭮𐭭 𐭡𐭢𐭩 \ 𐭠𐭥𐭲𐭧𐭱𐭲𐭥 𐭬𐭫𐭪𐭠 mzdysn bgy ʼrthštr MLKA {...}.

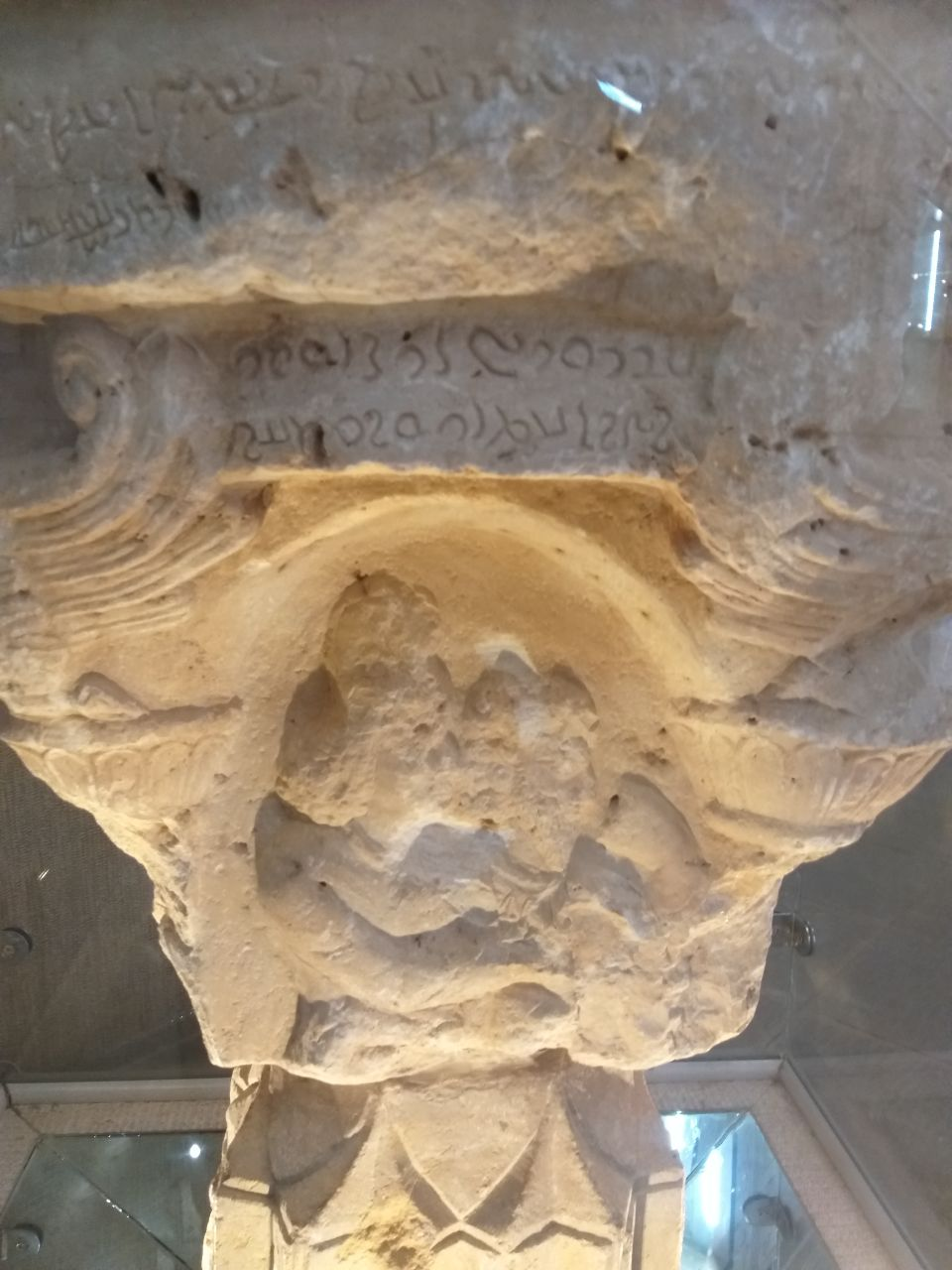
One side of the Nasrabad fire altar dedicated to Shapur I for his 243/4 victory over the Romans.

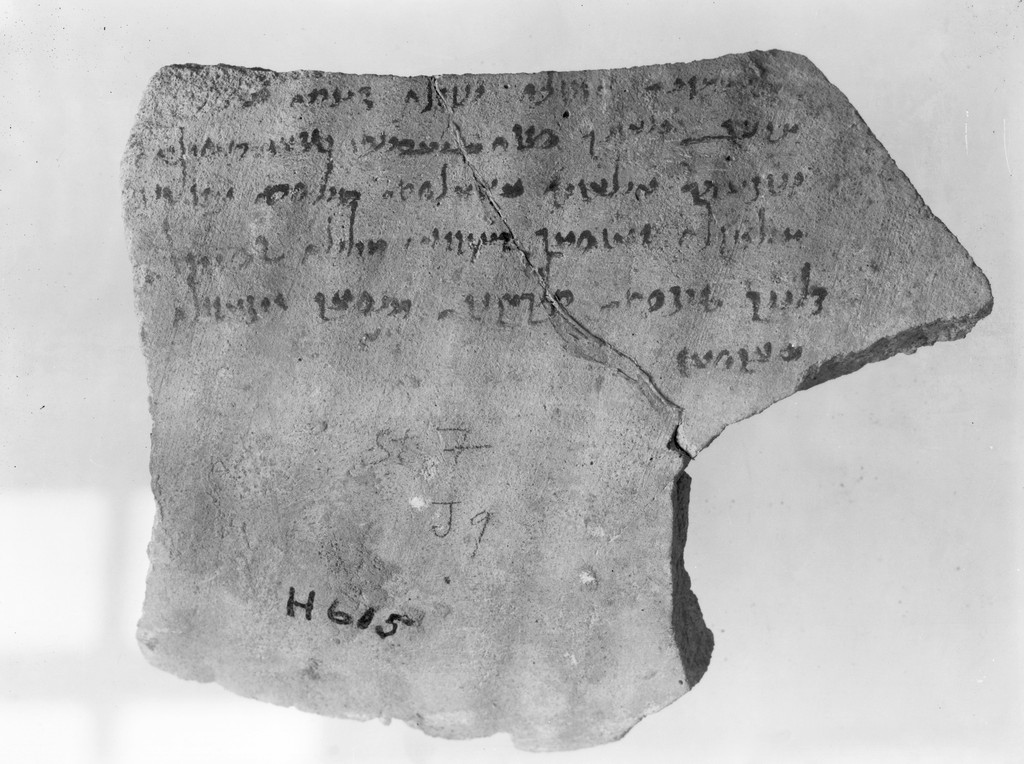
The one Middle Persian ostracon from Dura-Europos listing twenty-seven professions. (Note: Examples of listed professions: 𐭭𐭠𐭭𐭯𐭠𐭪 nʾnpʾk 'baker', 𐭪𐭯𐭱𐭪𐭫𐭩 kpškly 'shoemaker', 𐭪𐭱𐭲𐭪𐭫𐭩 kštkly 'plowman', 𐭦𐭩𐭭𐭣𐭠𐭭𐭩𐭪 zyndʾnyk 'jailer', 𐭣𐭯𐭩𐭫𐭯𐭲𐭩 dpylpty 'chief scribe', and 𐭮𐭠𐭯𐭮𐭲𐭭 šʾpstn 'harem keeper')

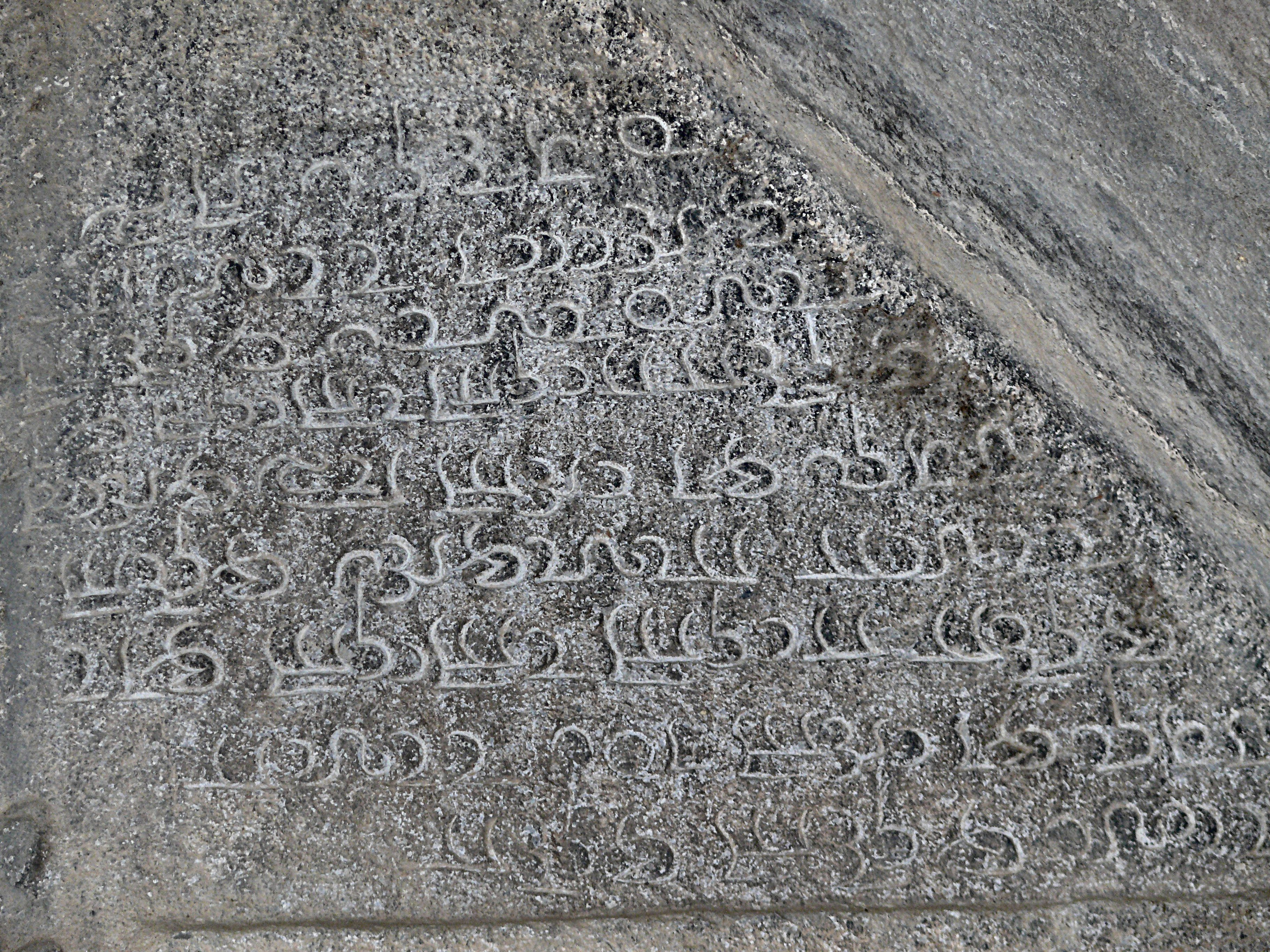
Inscription of Shapur II at Taq-e Bostan, including some rudimentary ligatures (letters joined on the baseline).

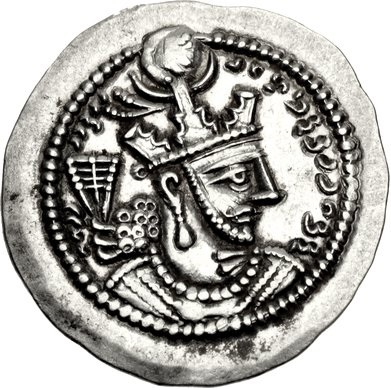
Drachm of Yazdegerd II (struck ca. 439-447) inscribed: ⤹ 𐭬𐭦𐭣𐭩𐭮𐭭 𐭡𐭢𐭩 \ 𐭪𐭣𐭩 𐭩𐭦𐭣𐭪𐭫𐭲𐭩 mzdysn bgy kdy yzdklty /Mazdesn bay Kay Yazdgard/.

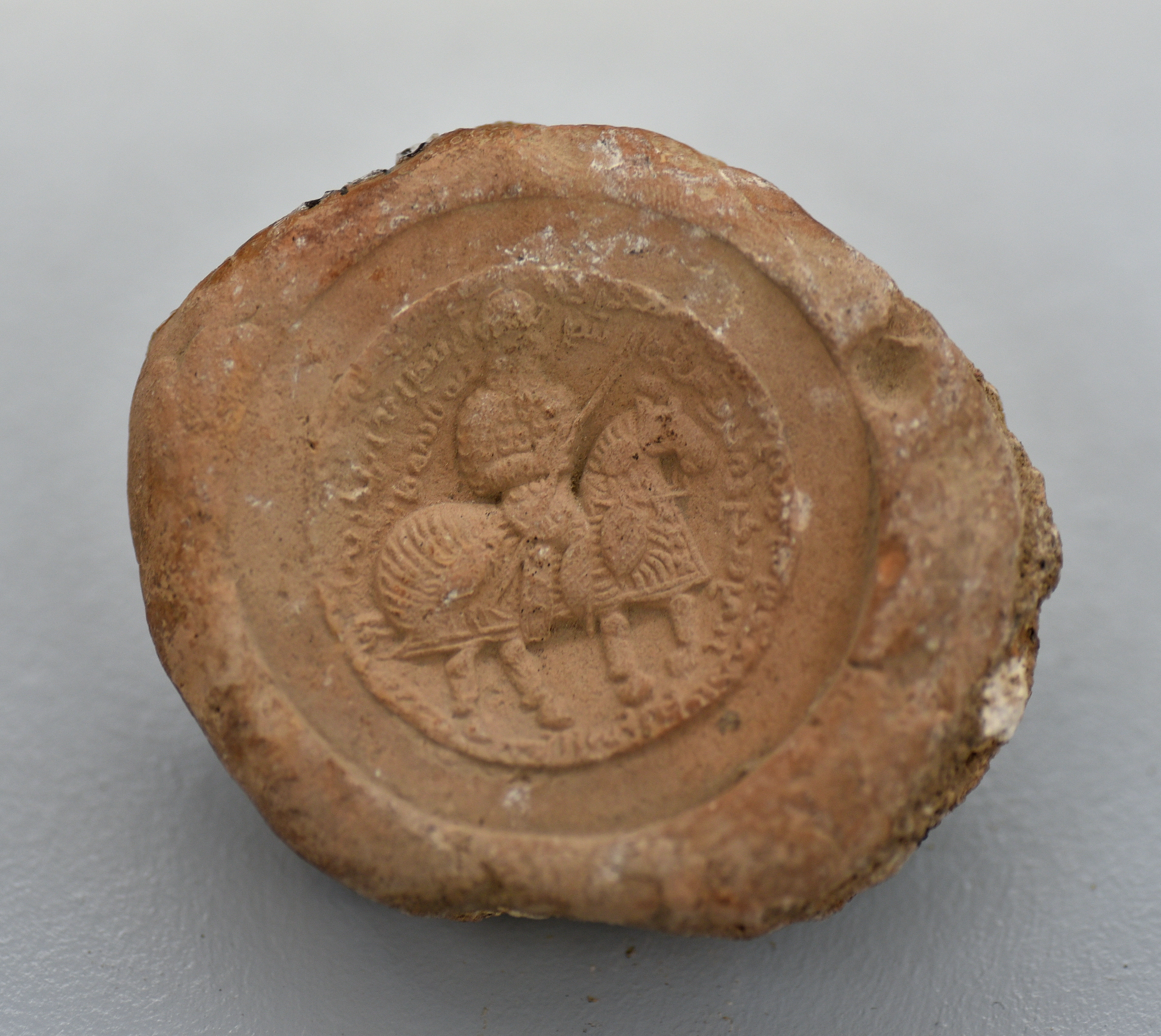
A bulla (seal) of Wahrām, an Ērān-spāhbed. It mentions either Husraw I (r. 531–579) or II (591–626).

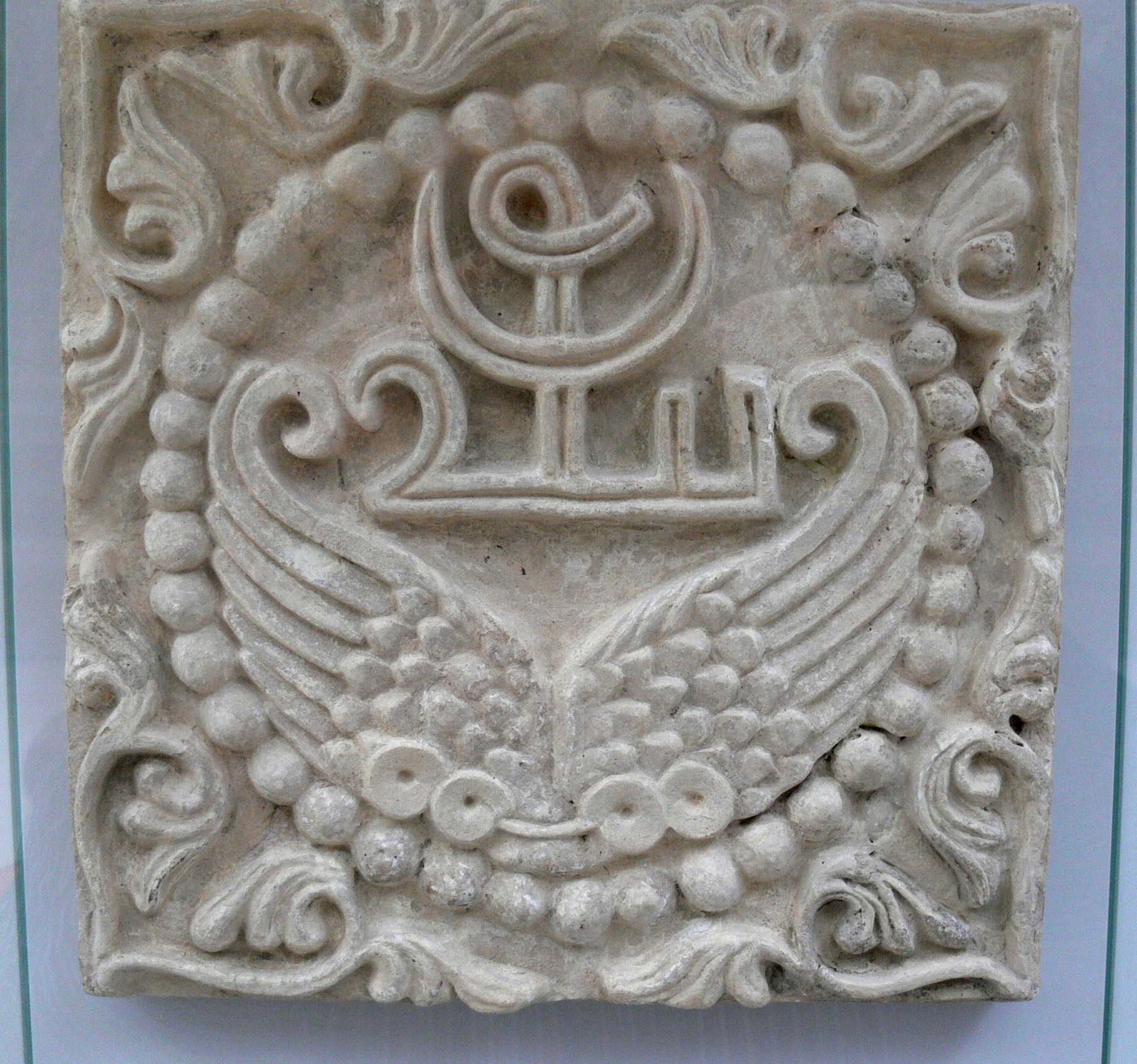
6th/7th century relief with the monogram ʼpr, (Note: 𐭠𐭯𐭥) which stands for afzūn farr (See Khvarenah).
