= Adel Yazdi Gallery =

Gallery House in Shiraz, Iran

Adel Yazdi Gallery House
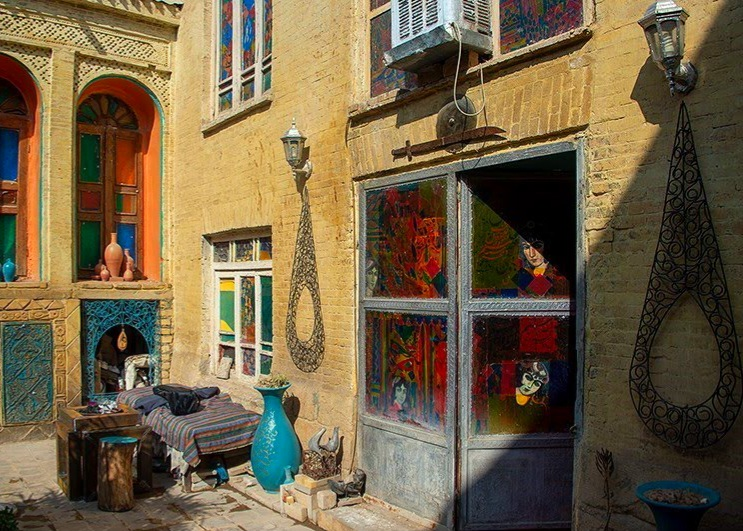
- A view of the gallery

- Location of Adel Yazdi Gallery House in Iran
- Established: 2019
- Location: Shiraz, Fars province, Iran
- Coordinates: 29.6089050°N 52.5533852°E
- Type: Art gallery
- Founder: Adel Yazdi

Adel Yazdi Gallery House (Persian: خانه گالری عادل یزدی) is located in the historic district of Shiraz, in the Qavam House neighborhood. This gallery house was founded by Adel Yazdi, an Iranian artist and sculptor, with the aim of transforming the city's old texture into a cultural center and promoting art. Utilizing multiple rooms and artistic designs, this space provides visitors with an insight into the artistic lifestyle and the process of creating artworks.

== Features ==
Adel Yazdi Gallery House consists of multiple rooms, each decorated with unique artworks and designs. It is recognized as the third registered gallery house in the National Heritage of Iran list, following the Nader Khalili Gallery House on Hormuz Island and the Vaziri Moghaddam Cave Gallery in Tehran.

Furthermore, inspired by the Centre Pompidou in Paris, Yazdi aims to transform the alleys of Shiraz into a dynamic cultural hub. His works, which have gained attention on social media, have become an attraction for tourists, showcasing a unique aspect of Iran’s artistic heritage.

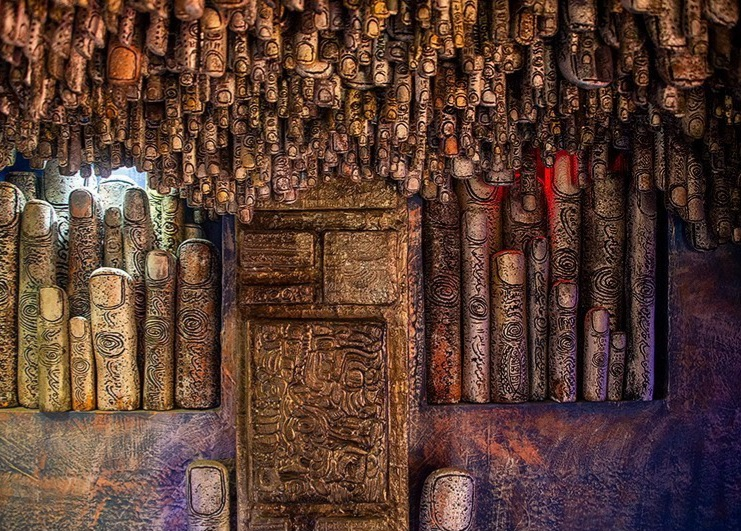
The "Finger Room," housing approximately 14,000 sculptures.

One of his most notable works is the "Finger Room," where around 14,000 finger sculptures are attached to the ceiling, pointing downward. This artwork is inspired by the legend of an angel who counts raindrops with thousands of fingers, symbolizing the importance of living in the present moment.

== Activities ==
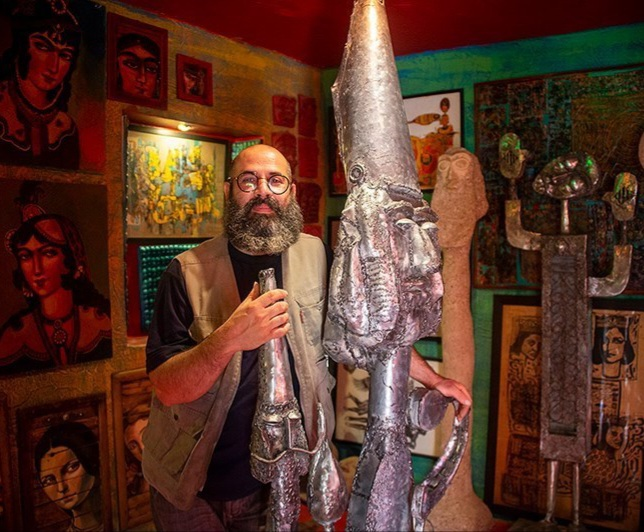
Adel Yazdi in his gallery, November 2021

In addition to showcasing artworks, this gallery house serves as a cultural center by hosting workshops and artistic events, attracting tourists and art enthusiasts. Adel Yazdi has also created murals and prominent sculptures in the alleys of the neighborhood, transforming the historic fabric of Shiraz into an artistic and cultural space.

== Cultural significance ==
Adel Yazdi Gallery House plays a crucial role in revitalizing the historic district of Shiraz and promoting art in the region. By attracting tourists and art lovers, it has significantly contributed to the cultural and economic development of the Narenjestan Qavam neighborhood.
