= Sasanian royal court =

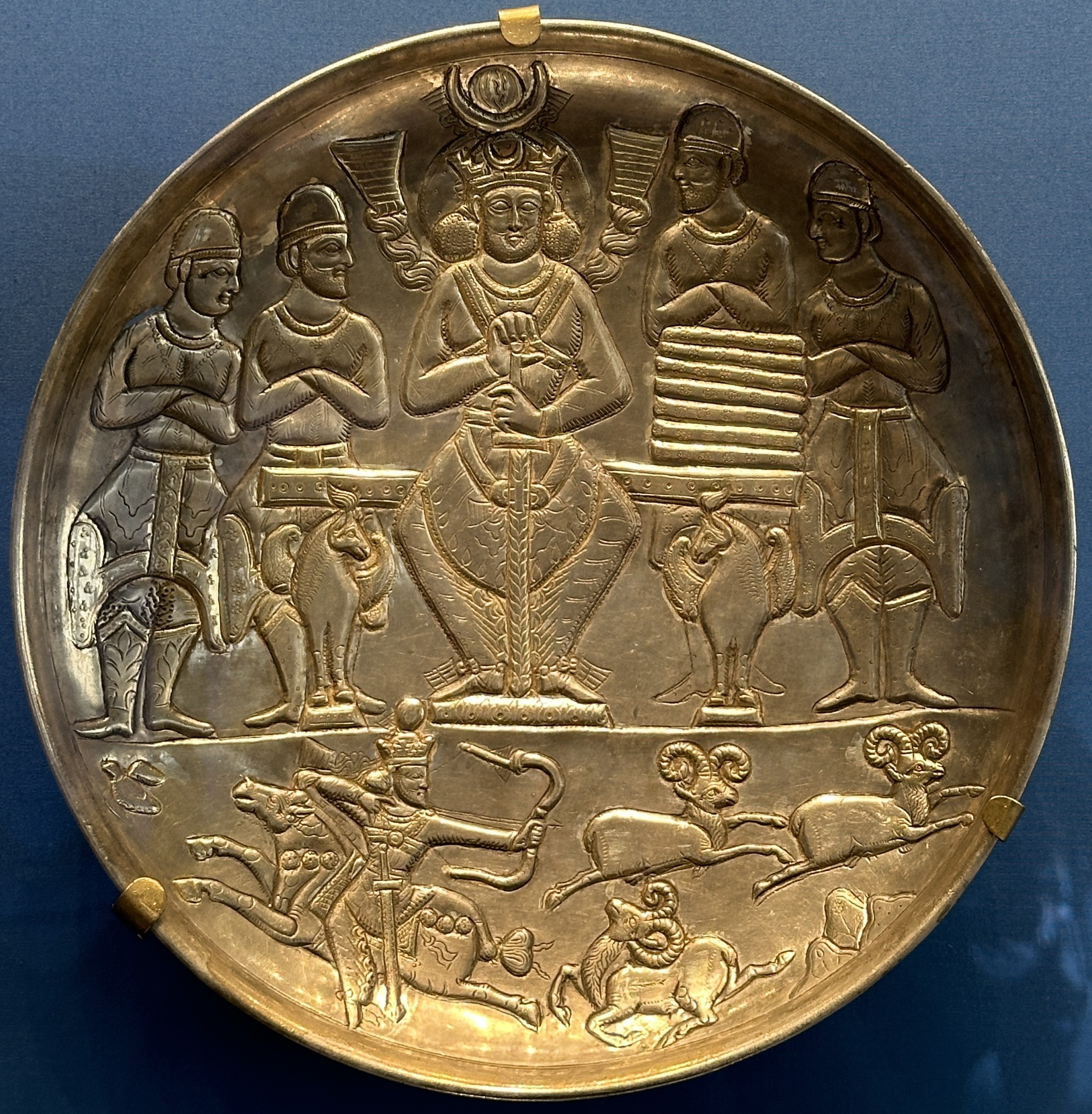
Plate depicting Khosrow II and nobles, Hermitage Museum

The Sasanian royal court was an extended royal household of the Sasanian shahanshah (King of Kings), including all those who would regularly attend.

== Historiography ==
Reconstructing Sasanian court life fully is impossible due to the lack of written documents. Information is limited to a several inscriptions, secondary accounts from contemporary Greek, Latin, Armenian, and Syriac writers, as well as later Arabic and New Persian texts.

== Court ranks and roles ==
The pasagriw sat directly beside the shahanshah. While the precise definition of this position is still unclear, the crown prince or designated heir likely held it. The duties of pasagriw was possibly restricted to the administration of Mesopotamia. This role appears to have replaced the Parthian office of bidaxsh, who was either the royal heir or a viceroy representing the king at various courts.

The darigan salar (majordomo), held authority over all members of the court. Counselors, known as andarzbad, were also present at court. A seal located in the Hermitage Museum in Saint Petersburg features the name of one specific court counselor, a eunuch named Mahan. According to Armenian records, a eunuch could occupy powerful positions. Examples include acting as the guardian of the queens in the harem or serving as the palace steward, which mirrored practices in Armenia. Similar to the system of the Byzantine Empire, they could also serve as the head of the imperial advisors.

Shapur I's inscription at the Ka'ba-ye Zartosht mentions the counselor of the queens. A seal discovered at Qasr-e Abunasr close to Shiraz and the Middle Persian document Mādayān ī Hazār Dādestān record the counselor of the Zoroastrian priests. Provincial counselors existed as well. The Persepolis inscription of Shapur II documents an advisor in Sakastan, and Armenian texts contain further references. Both high-ranking bureaucrats and religious authorities belonged to the royal court. Examples of these court members include the hazarbed, the wuzurg framadar, and the 3rd-century high priest Kartir.

Discussions regarding imperial policy occurred during Sasanian banquets and feasts, which also functioned as events for giving away gifts like silver bowls, a practice preceding the Sasanians. To show their rank during court visits, noblemen wore a tiara and a belt decorated with jewels. Anyone arriving without a tiara was barred from sitting at the royal table and could not give advice to the shahanshah. A golden throne was reserved for the shahanshah, while vassal rulers and courtiers sat on shorter chairs to show their social standing based on the chairs material or location. If any of them lost their approval, the shahanshah would order that person's seat to be taken out of the throne room.

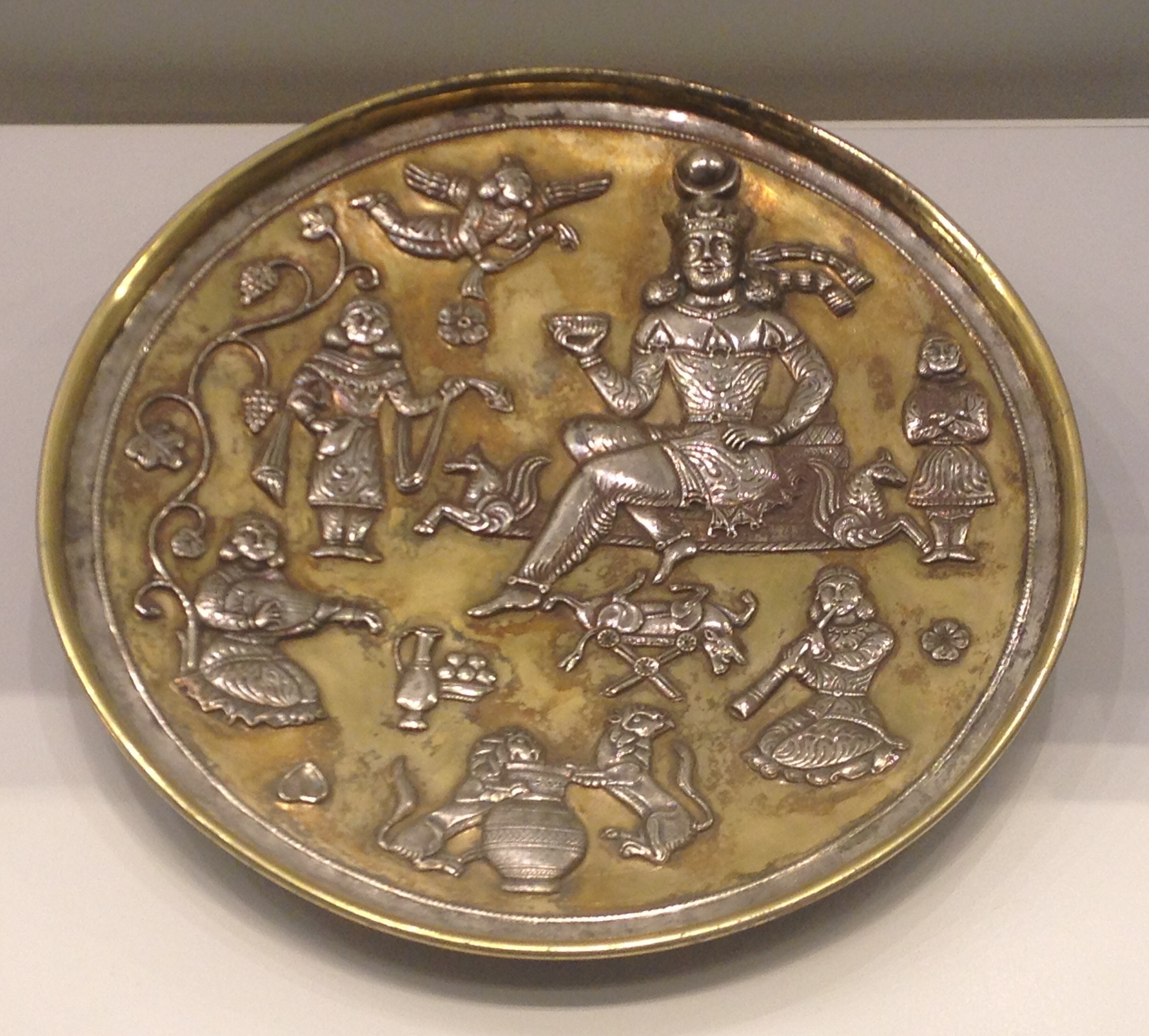
7th–8th century plate depicting a drinking party in Sasanian style, Rabenou Gallery of Islamic Art

The shahanshah had a curtain that isolated him from the assembly hall. It was seemingly drawn aside for major public events attended by not only court officials, but also many from outside the court, including commoners. Otherwise, the shahanshah was often hidden by his curtain and ate his meals alone. When it was time for amusement, he broke his isolation by instructing the curtain administrator (khurram-bash) to call for particular songs or jokes. Silence was mandatory while such a conversation was taking place. The shahanshah then consumed wine and reviewed court petitions during the entertainment. Punishment would be imposed to those who tried to exploit the shahanshah while he was under the influence of alcohol.

Because happiness, laughter and festivity was cherished in Zoroastrianism, entertainers like jesters and musicians were highly esteemed. They maintained a central role in daily court assemblies. Stability and prosperity in the empire was reflected in the activities of jesters, clowns and musicians.

== Diplomatic protocol ==
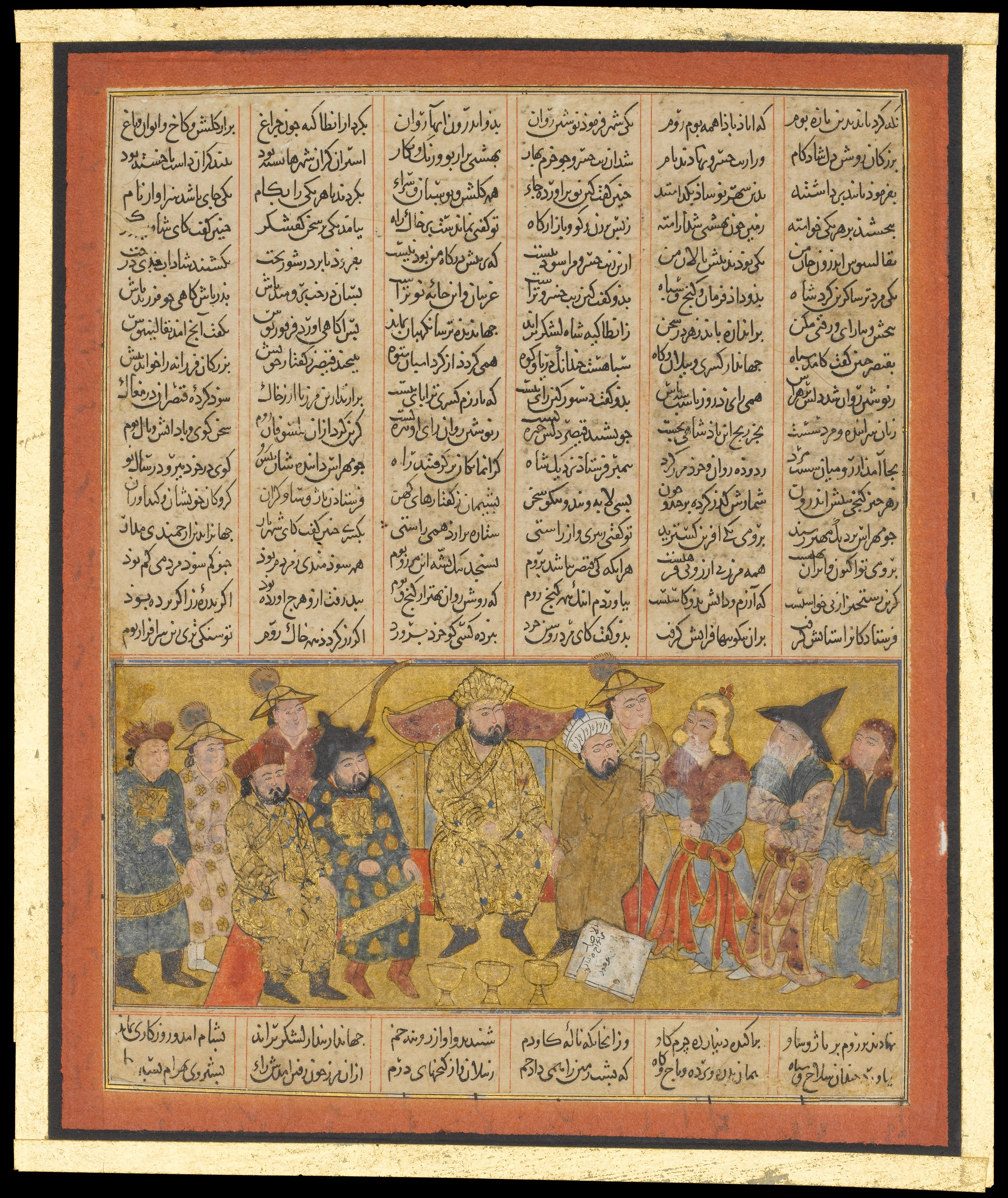
"Nushirvan receives Mihras, envoy of Caesar", folio from a 14th century copy of the Shahnameh

The diplomatic protocol of the Sasanian court developed from native practices that incorporated Roman customs through a process of mutual exchange between the two powers. A romanticized version of the court during the late Sasanian period is depicted by the 11th century Persian national epic Shahnameh, which stated that the Roman emissaries witnessed incredible and frightening displays upon entering the palace.

On their path to the audience chamber, the emissaries walked past wild animals, such as lions or elephants, which served as royal symbols and were tied up with golden chains. Within the palace complex, the royal bodyguard and court officials stood arranged by rank, giving their ovation while showcasing their weapons and insignia. The Shahnameh mentions that the clothing of the courtiers denoted their status, mirroring Roman practices.

== Throne room layout ==
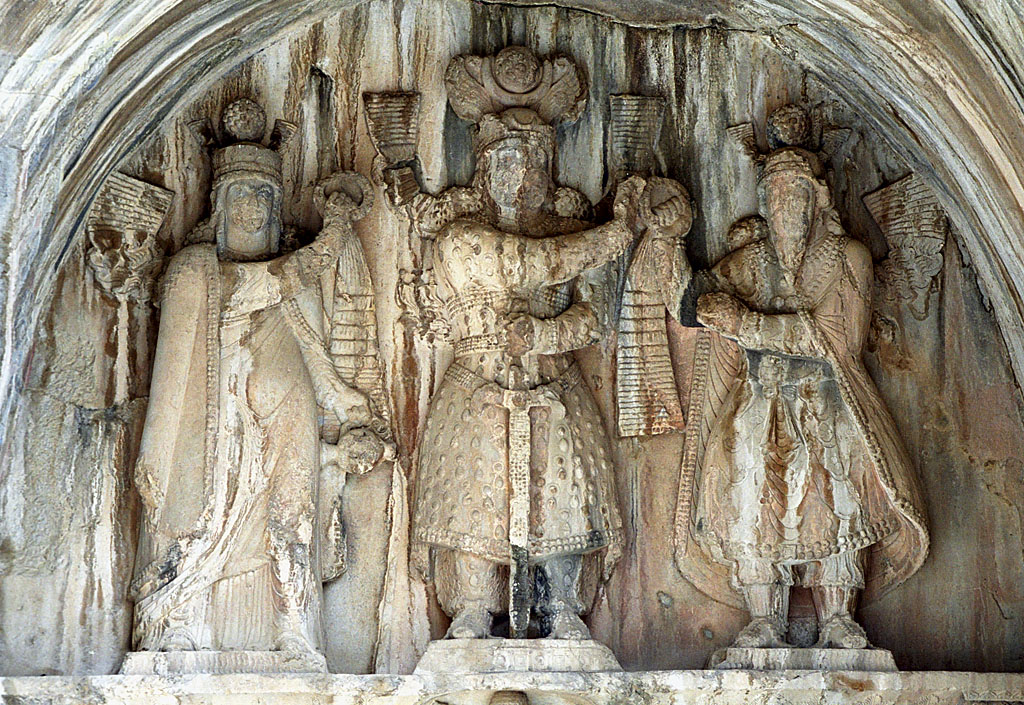
Sasanian relief at Taq-e Bostan depicting Khosrow II being given diadems by the Zoroastrian gods Anahita (left) and Ahura Mazda.

The closest available eyewitness description of the inside of the Ctesiphon throne room is recorded by the medieval Muslim polymath al-Tabari, who recounts the experiences of the Muslim forces who captured the city. Along with detailing the vast amount of wealth that was plundered, he wrote;

When Sa'd entered al-Mada'in [Ctesiphon], he saw that it was vacated. Finally, he came to the Great Hall of the king's palace. . . . He adopted the Great Hall as site for the prayer ritual. There were plaster statues there, of men and horses, but that did not prevent Sa'd, nor the other Muslims, (from praying there) and they were left as they were."

According to the American historian Matthew Canepa, the throne room could have included aspects similar to Khosrow II's rock relief at Taq-e Bostan. The shahanshah expanded a native custom to project Sasanian royal ideology by having golden chairs symbolically placed around his throne. This setup was a physical representation of their ideal global order;

In the collection of customs of the reception hall of [Khosrow I] Anoshervan was [one that dictated that], inside [the throne room], a golden chair was placed to the right of his throne [takht], and in this manner golden chairs were placed too to the left and to the rear, thus three chairs. One of the chairs was for the king of China, another was for the king of Rome, and the third was that of the Khazar [var. "Hephthalite"] king, so that when they came to his reception hall they could sit on the chairs. Year in and year out these three chairs stood, and they were not removed, and, but for these three, no other was allowed to sit on them. And in front of the throne there was a golden throne on which Bozorgmehr [Wuzurgmihr i Boxtagan, the wuzurg framadar or "vizier"] sat, and lower than that [chair] there was a chair of the chief Mobed and below that was a number of chairs for all the governors and nobles of the realm, and the place of each one was fixed so that no one would be able to make a dispute with another. And when Khosrow became angry with one, his chair was moved from the Ayvan.

While the Muslim forces were plundering the Sasanian royal palace at Ctesiphon, they discovered armor and swords in the treasury. They identified these items as the gear of "subject" rulers, which included the Byzantine emperor Heraclius, the "Khagan", and Dahir (an Indian monarch). Weapons from various failed usurpers were also part of the collection. According to Canepa; "It is possible that these were displayed, again for an internal audience, to define the king of kings as a universal monarch, even if in reality the last remaining Sasanian sovereigns were deferential to Heraclius."

== Sources ==
- Canepa, Matthew P. (2009). The Two Eyes of the Earth: Art and Ritual of Kingship Between Rome and Sasanian Iran. University of California Press. ISBN 978-0520257276.
- Gignoux, Philippe (1993). "Courts and Courtiers ii. In the Parthian and Sasanian periods". In Yarshater, Ehsan (ed.). Encyclopædia Iranica (Online ed.). Encyclopædia Iranica Foundation. ISBN 978-1568590073.
- de Jong, Albert (2003). "Sub specie maiestatis: Reflections on Sasanian Court Rituals". In Stausberg, Michael (ed.). Zoroastrian Rituals in Context. Brill Publishers. pp. 345–365. ISBN 978-9004131316.
