= Inscriptional Pahlavi (Unicode block) =

- Range: U+10B60..U+10B7F (32 code points)
- Plane: SMP
- Scripts: Inscriptional Pahlavi
- Major alphabets: Middle Persian monumental
- Assigned: 27 code points
- Unused: 5 reserved code points

Unicode version history
- 5.2 (2009): 27 (+27)

Unicode documentation
- Code chart ∣ Web page

Inscriptional Pahlavi is a Unicode block containing monumental inscription characters for writing Middle Persian.

Inscriptional Pahlavi^{[1]}^{[2]} Official Unicode Consortium code chart (PDF)
	0	1	2	3	4	5	6	7	8	9	A	B	C	D	E	F
U+10B6x	𐭠	𐭡	𐭢	𐭣	𐭤	𐭥	𐭦	𐭧	𐭨	𐭩	𐭪	𐭫	𐭬	𐭭	𐭮	𐭯
U+10B7x	𐭰	𐭱	𐭲						𐭸	𐭹	𐭺	𐭻	𐭼	𐭽	𐭾	𐭿
Notes: 1. As of Unicode version 16.0; 2. Grey areas indicate non-assigned code points

== History ==
The following Unicode-related documents record the purpose and process of defining specific characters in the Inscriptional Pahlavi block:

Version	Final code points (Note: Proposed code points and characters names may differ from final code points and names)	Count	L2 ID	WG2 ID	Document
5.2	U+10B60..10B72, 10B78..10B7F	27	L2/00-128		Bunz, Carl-Martin (2000-03-01), Scripts from the Past in Future Versions of Unicode
5.2	U+10B60..10B72, 10B78..10B7F	27	L2/01-007		Bunz, Carl-Martin (2000-12-21), "Inscriptional Alphabets (Middle Persian, Parthian) and Sogdian vs. Aramaic", Iranianist Meeting Report: Symposium on Encoding Iranian Scripts in Unicode
5.2	U+10B60..10B72, 10B78..10B7F	27	L2/02-009		Bunz, Carl-Martin (2001-11-23), "Avestan and Pahlavi scripts", 2nd Iranian Meeting Report
5.2	U+10B60..10B72, 10B78..10B7F	27	L2/02-449	N2556	Everson, Michael (2002-12-04), Revised proposal to encode the Avestan and Pahlavi script in the UCS
5.2	U+10B60..10B72, 10B78..10B7F	27	L2/07-102	N3241	Everson, Michael (2007-04-12), Proposal for encoding the Parthian, Inscriptional Pahlavi, and Psalter Pahlavi scripts in the BMP of the UCS
5.2	U+10B60..10B72, 10B78..10B7F	27		N3353 (pdf, doc)	Umamaheswaran, V. S. (2007-10-10), "M51.16", Unconfirmed minutes of WG 2 meeting 51 Hanzhou, China; 2007-04-24/27
5.2	U+10B60..10B72, 10B78..10B7F	27	L2/07-268	N3253 (pdf, doc)	Umamaheswaran, V. S. (2007-07-26), "8.17", Unconfirmed minutes of WG 2 meeting 50, Frankfurt-am-Main, Germany; 2007-04-24/27
5.2	U+10B60..10B72, 10B78..10B7F	27	L2/07-225		Moore, Lisa (2007-08-21), "C.8", UTC #112 Minutes
5.2	U+10B60..10B72, 10B78..10B7F	27	L2/07-207R	N3286R	Everson, Michael; Pournader, Roozbeh (2007-08-24), Proposal for encoding the Inscriptional Parthian, Inscriptional Pahlavi, and Psalter Pahlavi scripts in the SMP of the UCS
