= Bandian complex =

Archaeological site in Dargaz County, Iran

Coordinates: 37.4575°N 59.1058°E

Bandian complex

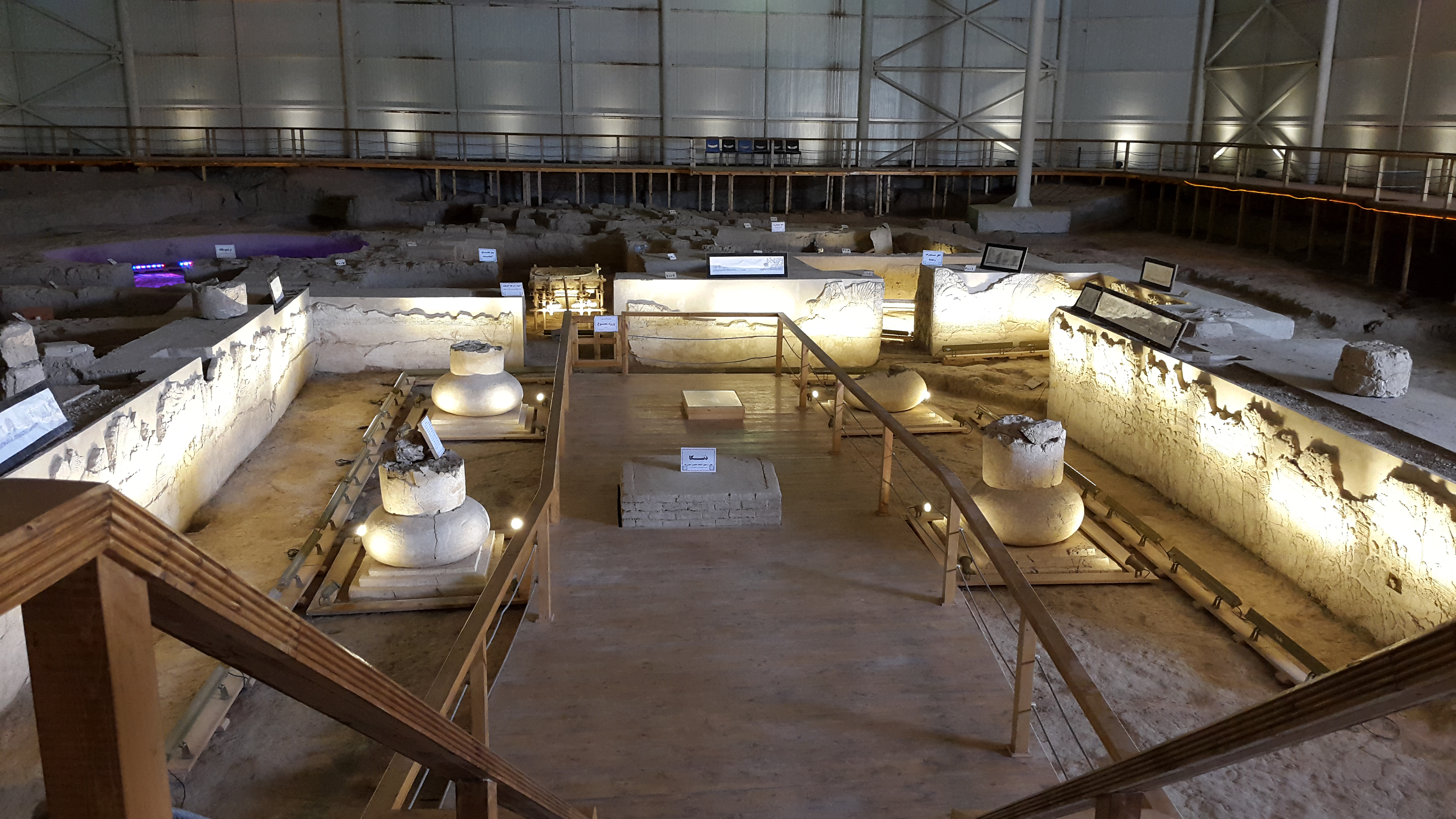
Bandian hallway

Location of the Bandian complex
Bandian (Iran)

The Bandian Fire Temple (Persian: محوطه باستانی بندیان) is an archaeological site in Dargaz County, Razavi Khorasan Province, Iran, near the medieval city Abiward. The primary excavations were carried out to reveal precious remains of art and architecture of pre-Islamic Iran, dating from the Sasanian era (224–651 AD), when the archaeological significance of Bandian was recognized.

Found at the site, near the town of Dargaz were a stucco-decorated hall with columns, Sasanian Pahlavi inscriptions, and, lastly, some remains of brick architecture, which are considered to be one of the most invaluable finds of that period. Additionally, the excavations yielded a Zoroastrian sanctuary, with a substantial amount of its decoration and design features undamaged. While the upper parts of the stucco reliefs were not preserved, but a good deal had remained in place (info from Bandian of Daregaz).

Throughout six seasons of the site's excavations, the building's central part was found; its main hall, measuring 10.25x8.45 m, as well as a number of rooms and corridors, were unearthed. The hall had four lime columns that supported the flat ceiling of the structure. The columns' strengthening structure is quite interesting. Another outstanding facet of the building is its mihrab (arched niche) measuring about 2.80 x 1.70 m.

The large hall features extensive stucco reliefs, depicting scenes of a hunt, battle, triumph, ritual, investiture, and banquet. It contains depictions of Persian victories in the Hephthalite–Sasanian Wars.

The complex has been dated to the reign of Peroz (459–484 CE) or his son Kavad I (488–497 CE).

The excavated area has been turned into a site-museum.

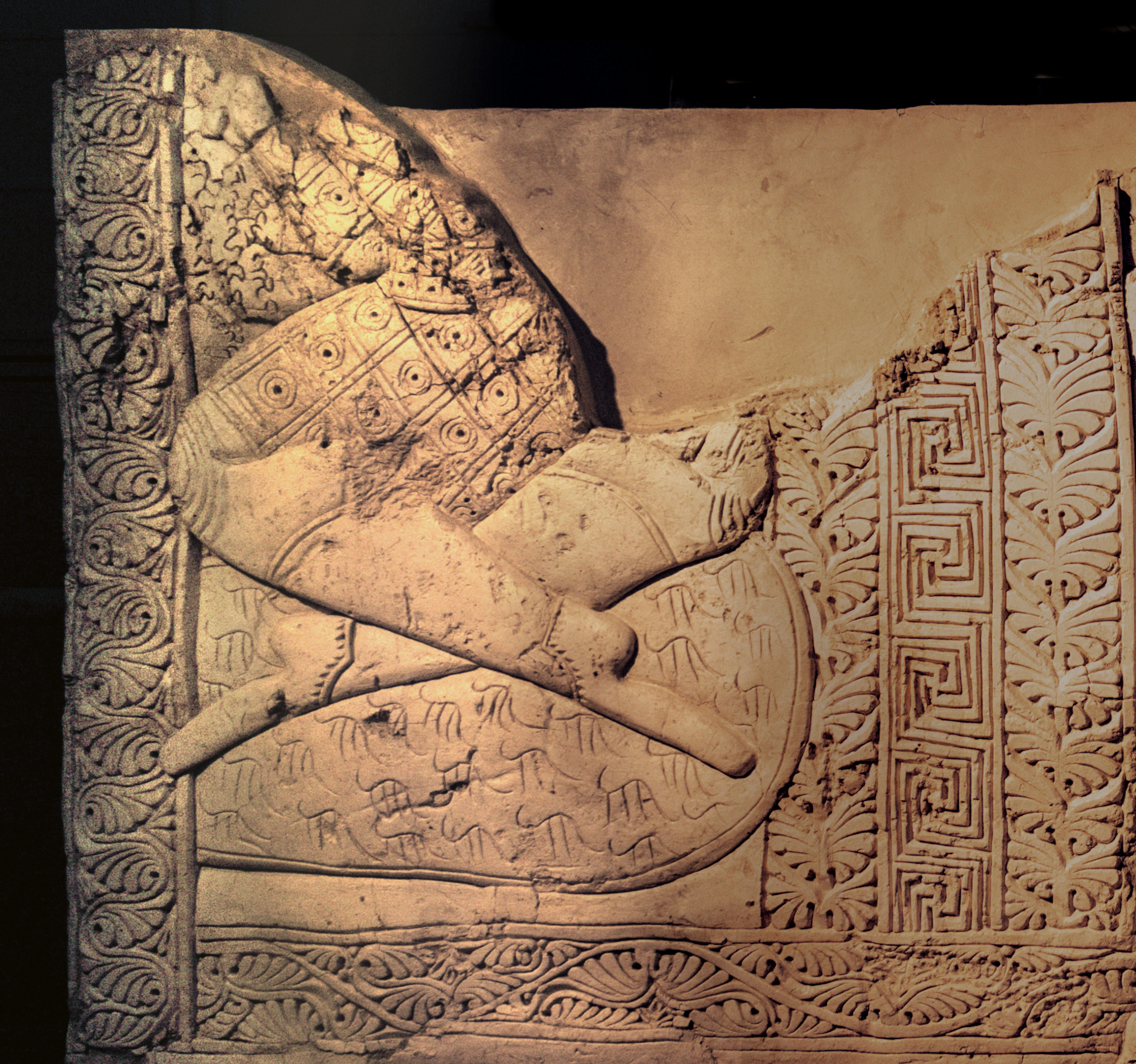
A probable Hephthalite ruler among the reliefs. The inscription reads: "I am Hephthalite, son … the Hephthalite is trustworthy".

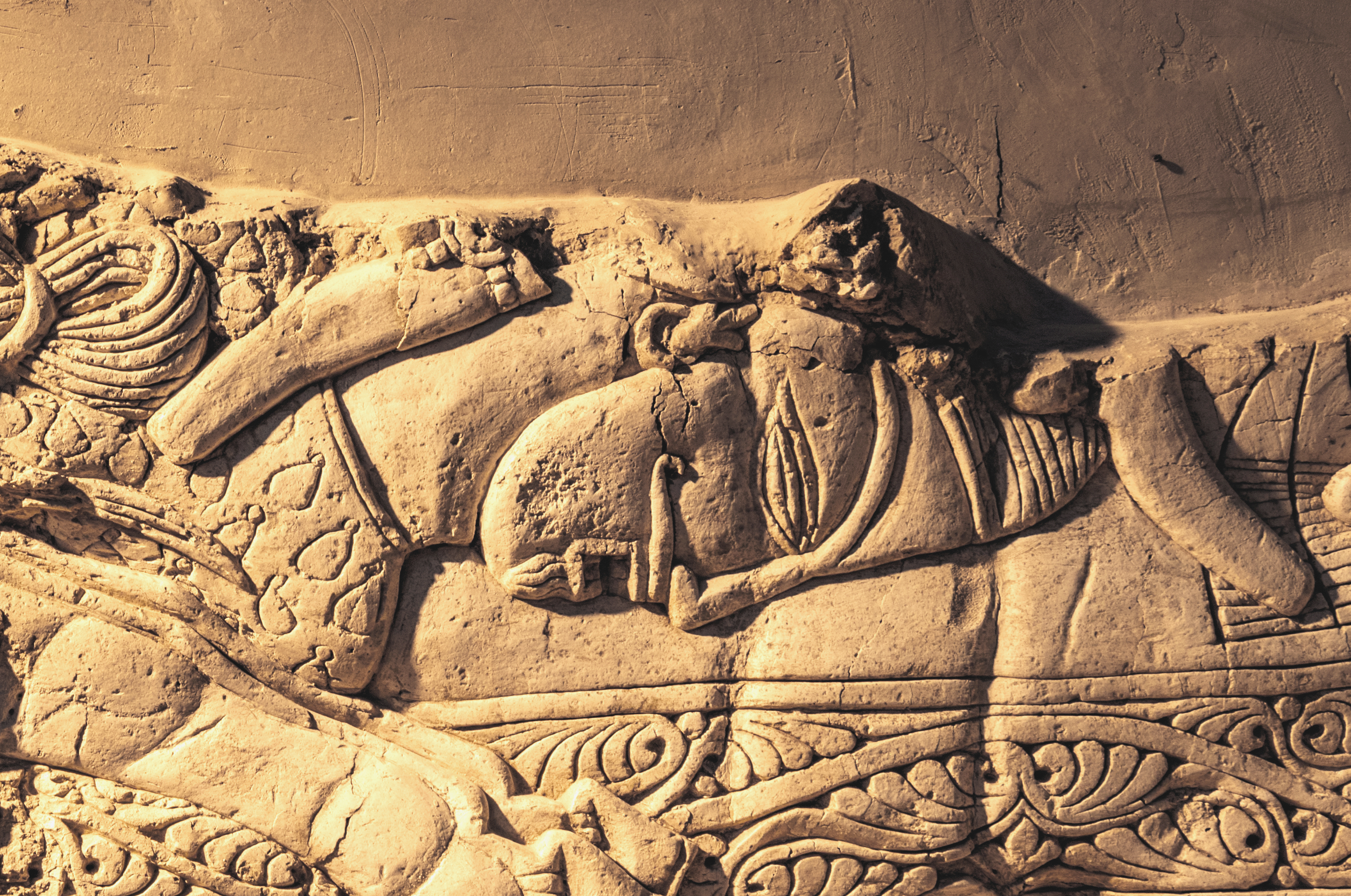
Vanquished Hephthalite.

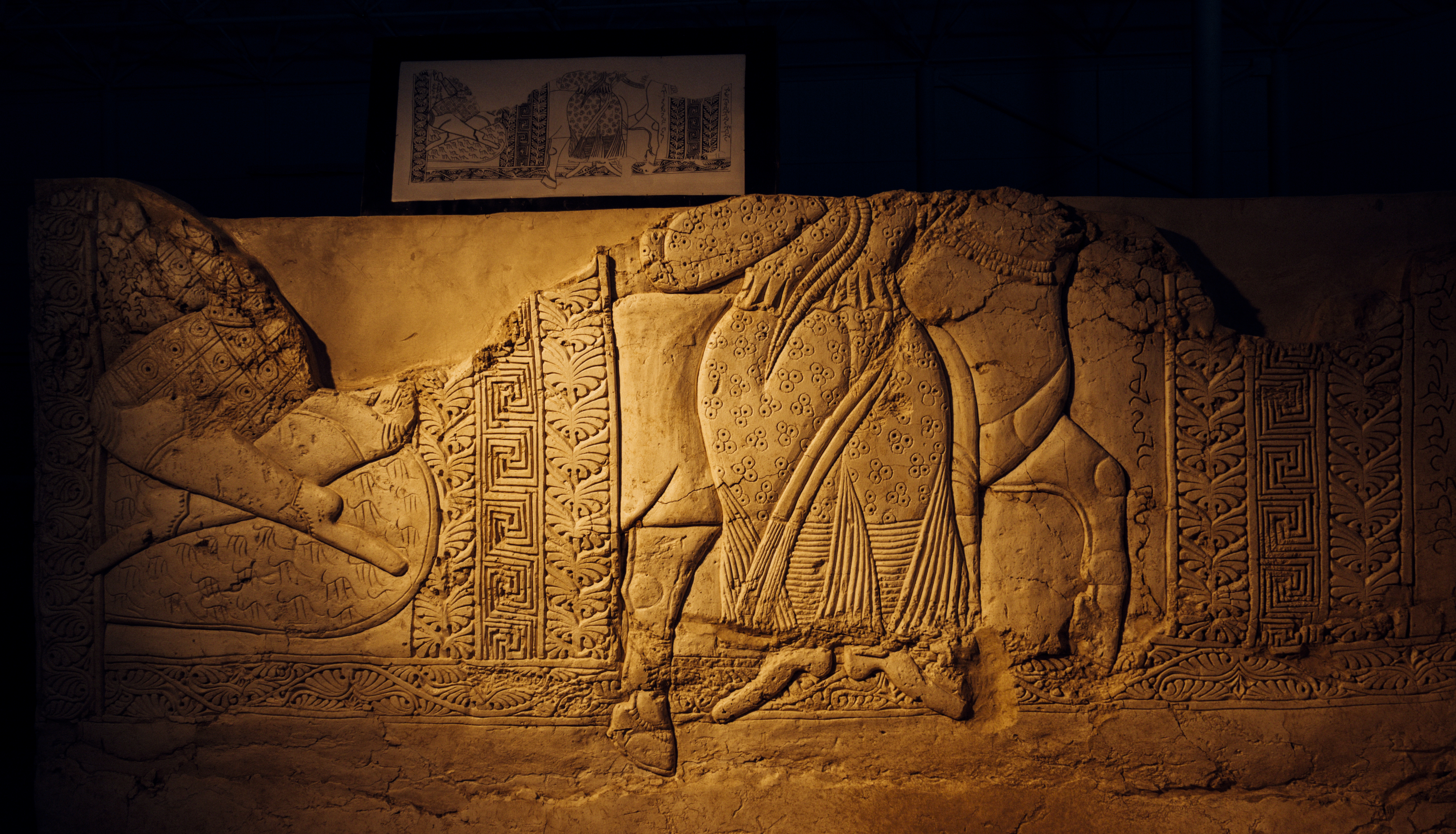
Courtly scenes

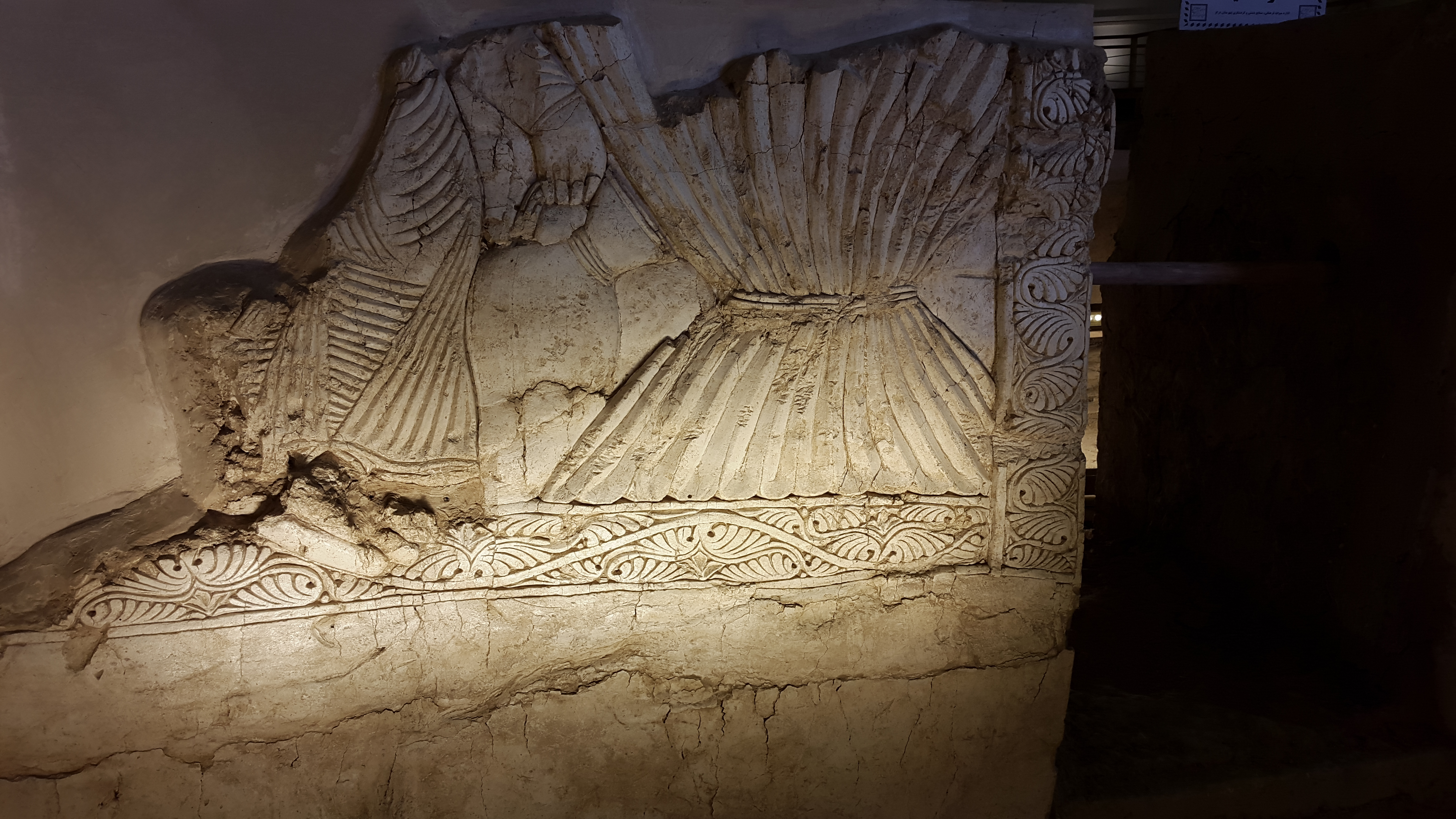
Bandian lady

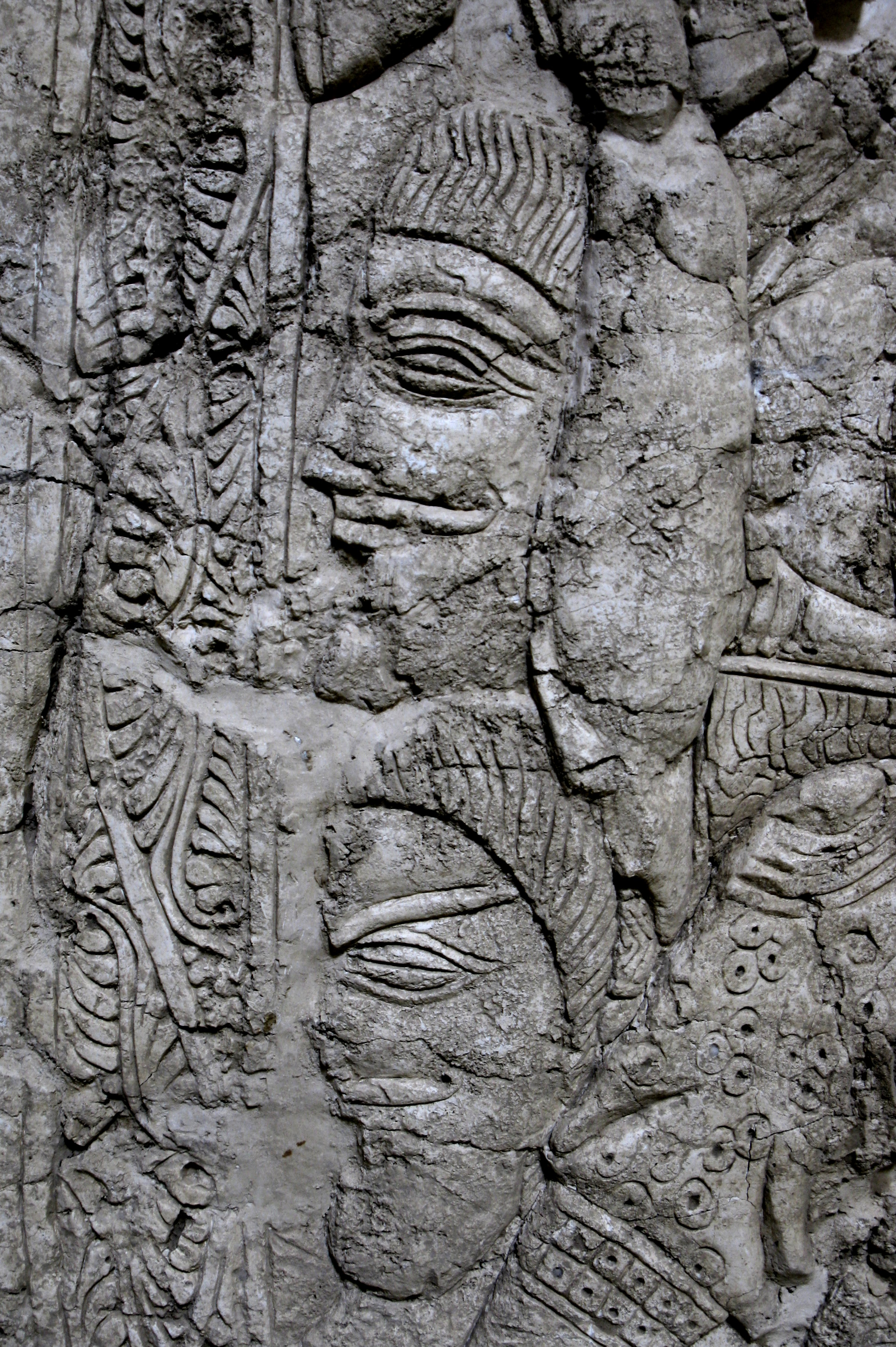
Vanquished Hephthalites
