= Farjam Behnam =

Iranian editor

Farjam Behnam (born in 1966 in Tehran, Iran) is an editor, researcher and founder of Iran Almanac.

He joined The Echo of Iran in 1998 and started his work as an editor and translator. In 2000 he started his own company and website, which is still online.

Selected to be a delegate for the UNHCR Refugee Congress in Washington D.C. As a delegate, Mr. Behnam represents resettled refugees in the state of Virginia.

== Publications ==
- Editor of Iran Almanac and The book of facts 2003 & 2007 - 2008.
- Editor and translator of Iran Who's Who 2000, 2003, 2006 & 2008.
- Translator and one of the contributors in The Echo of Iran Monthly published Political Bulletin, published in Iran and U.K.
- Editor and publisher of Iran Almanac monthly published political bulletin on Iran.
- Reports news for Iran-e Farda TV, news based in the UK
- Refugee Congress Delegate of Virginia, USA (UNHCR)

== Sources ==
- adinebook.com
- npec-web.org
- Getting Ready for Nuclear-Ready Iran. ISBN 1428916342.
- http://www.unicef.org/Iran/IRN_resources_Printed_E-library_eng.xls
- http://www.theisraelproject.org/atf/cf/...741E.../POLICYFOCUS84.PDF%5B%5D
- http://www.ketab.ir/DesktopDefault.aspx?TabID=3567%5B%5D
- http://www.zanschool.org/English/spip.php?article107&debut...15%5B%5D
- http://www.ir/glossaries/instance.php?id=345625&gid=4%5B%5D
- http://www.njscvva.org/.../2008%2006%2015%20-%20Consequences%20of%20Preventive%20Military%20Action%20
- http://www.worldcat.org/oclc/1039995
- http://www.ir/profile.aspx?id=4064%5B%5D
- Article title
- http://www.ketab.ir/DesktopDefault.aspx?TabID=3564%5B%5D
- http://www.isbn.ir/DesktopDefault.aspx?TabID=3564&Site...fa%5B%5D
- http://www.alimama.com/alexa/iranalmanac.com/
- Article title
- http://www.adinebook.com/gp/product/9649383360
