= Qavam House =

Historic site in Shiraz, Iran

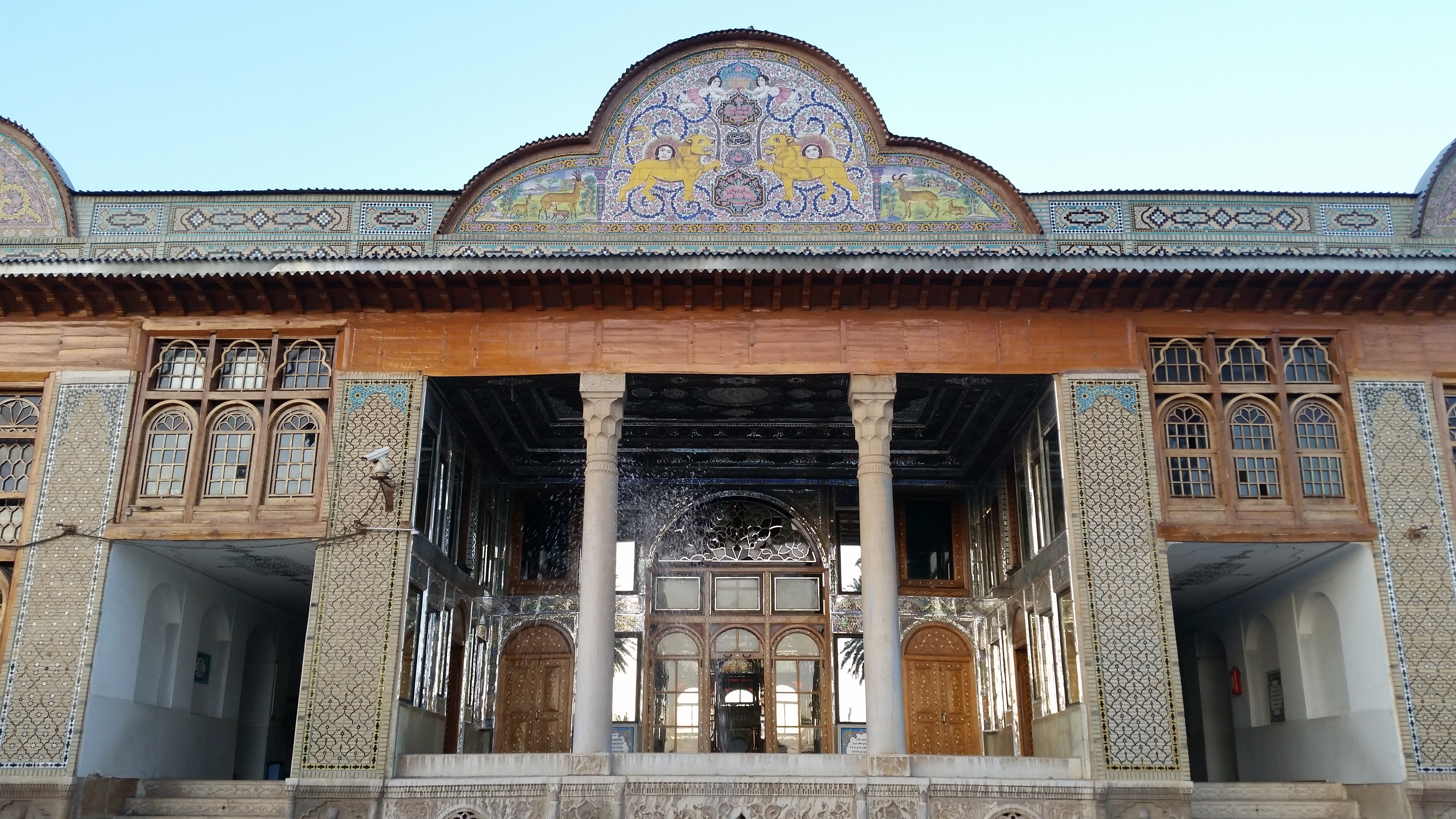
- Front facade with the image of the "Lion and Sun" (Qajar royal emblem) on the pediment.
- Alternative names: Narenjestan-e Ghavam, Ghavam House, Qavam Pavilion, House of Ghavam

General information
- Architectural style: Qajar style
- Location: Lotf Ali Khan Zand St, Shiraz, Fars province, Iran
- Coordinates: 29°36′28.24″N 52°33′9.25″E

Qavam House (Persian: خانه قوام), also known as Narenjestan-e Qavam (Persian: نارنجستان قوام), is a Qajar era house and garden in Shiraz, Iran, built between 1879 and 1886 commissioned by the Qavam family.

During the reign of Mohammad Reza Pahlavi, the house became the headquarters of Pahlavi University's Asia Institute, directed by Arthur Upham Pope, and later Richard Nelson Frye. As per 1979 the house and gardens are a museum and open to the public.

== Architecture ==
The house was built between 1879 and 1886 by Mirza Ibrahim Khan. The building stands two meters above the garden and is mainly made of bricks.

The Narenjestan garden is an example of the Persian gardens of Iran.

== Narenjestan Museum ==
The basement of the main building houses a museum displaying coin collections, Persian handicrafts and the Abnun Fire Pot.

=== Abnun Fire Pot ===
The Abnun Fire Pot or Abnūn Inscription or Nasrabad Fire Altar is a Sasanid-era stone fire altar discovered in Barm-e Delak, 10 km east of Shiraz. Built in the third year (243–244 CE) of the reign of Shapur I, it features a circular Inscriptional Pahlavi inscription, carved in three lines around the altar.

The subject of the inscription is the construction of a fire pit commissioned by Abnun, the master of court ceremonies, to commemorate the victory of Shapur I in 243 CE over the Roman army of Gordian III. Four faces are depicted on each side of the fire pot:

- Ardashir I, the legendary founder of the Sasanian dynasty and grandfather of the ruling king.
- Shapur I, the ruling king at the time the altar was made.
- The Behnams Aspez and Wahnam.
- Abnun, the master of ceremonies who commissioned the monument.

== Gallery ==
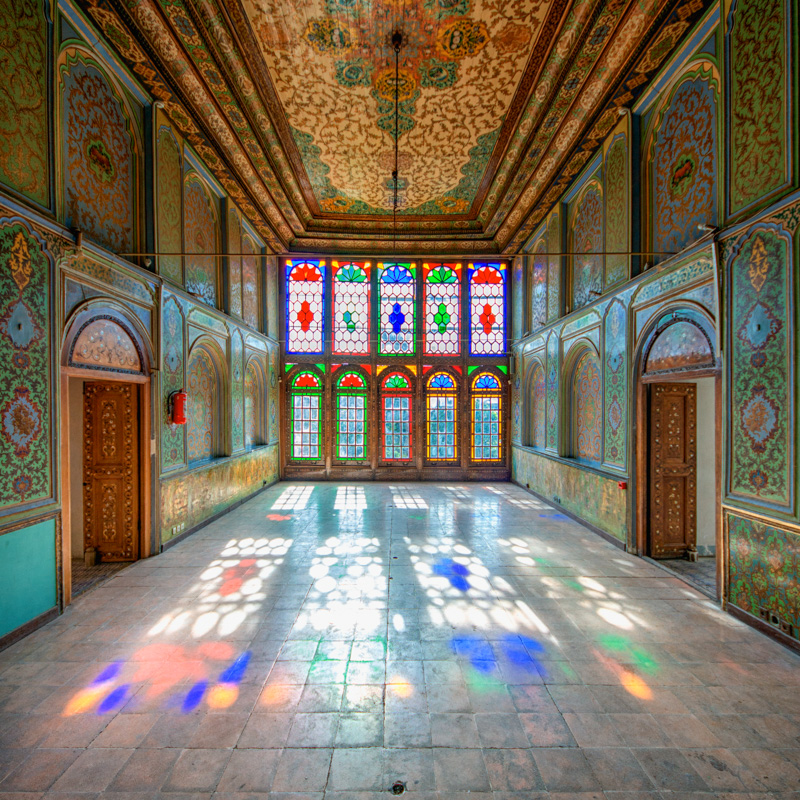
Interior of the house

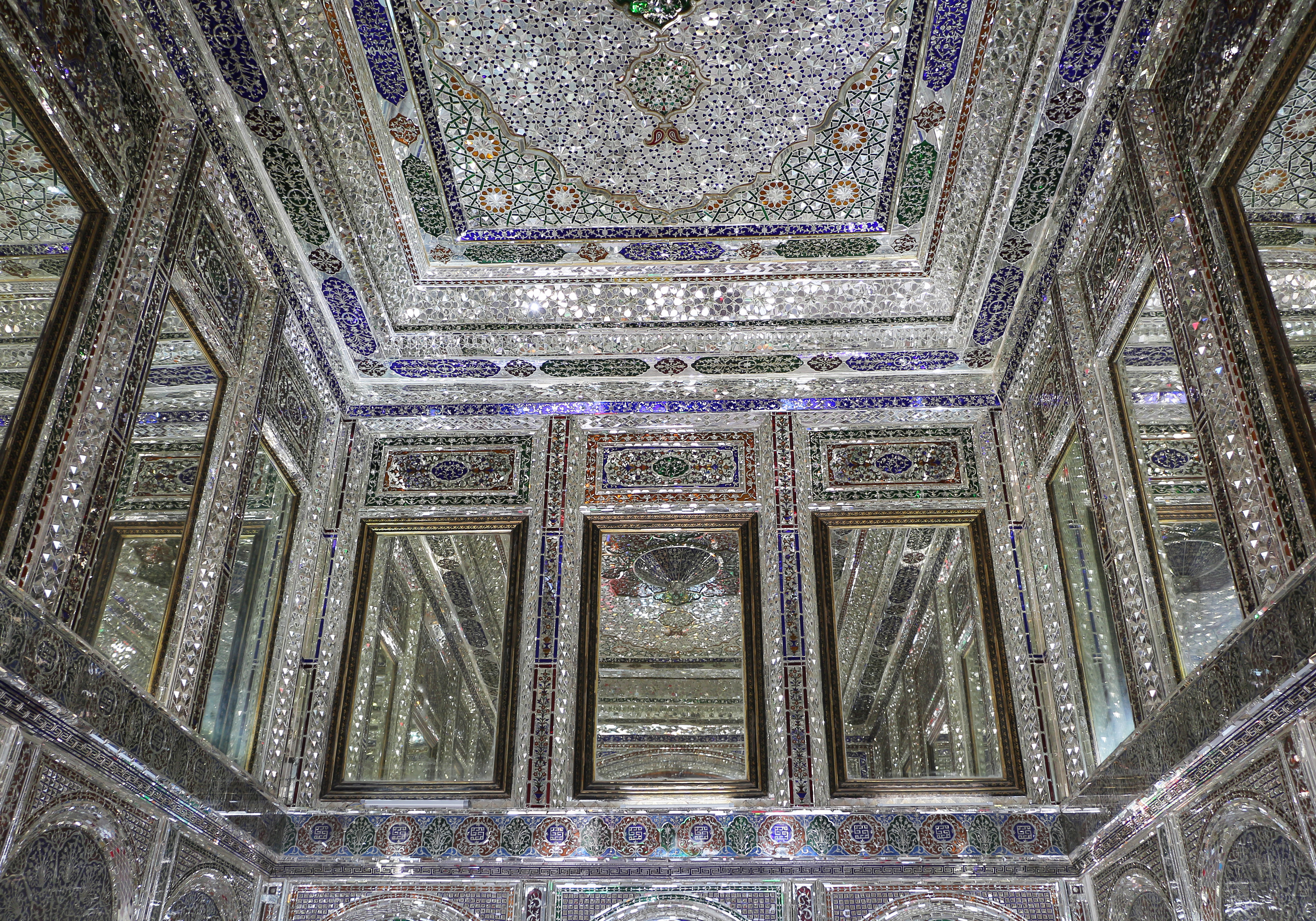
Interior of the house

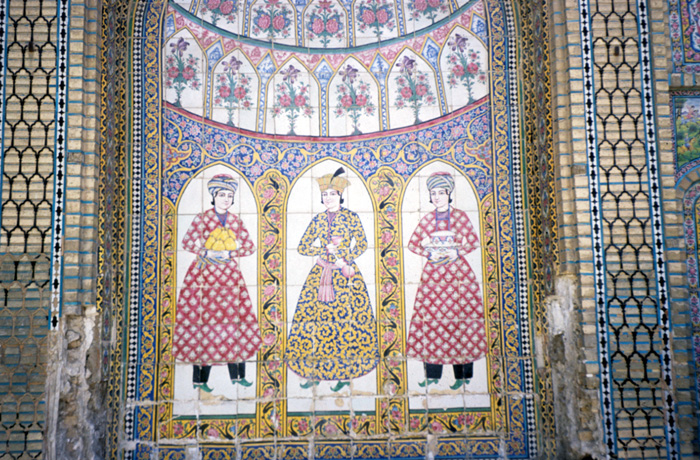
Wall painting depicting three Qajar figures.

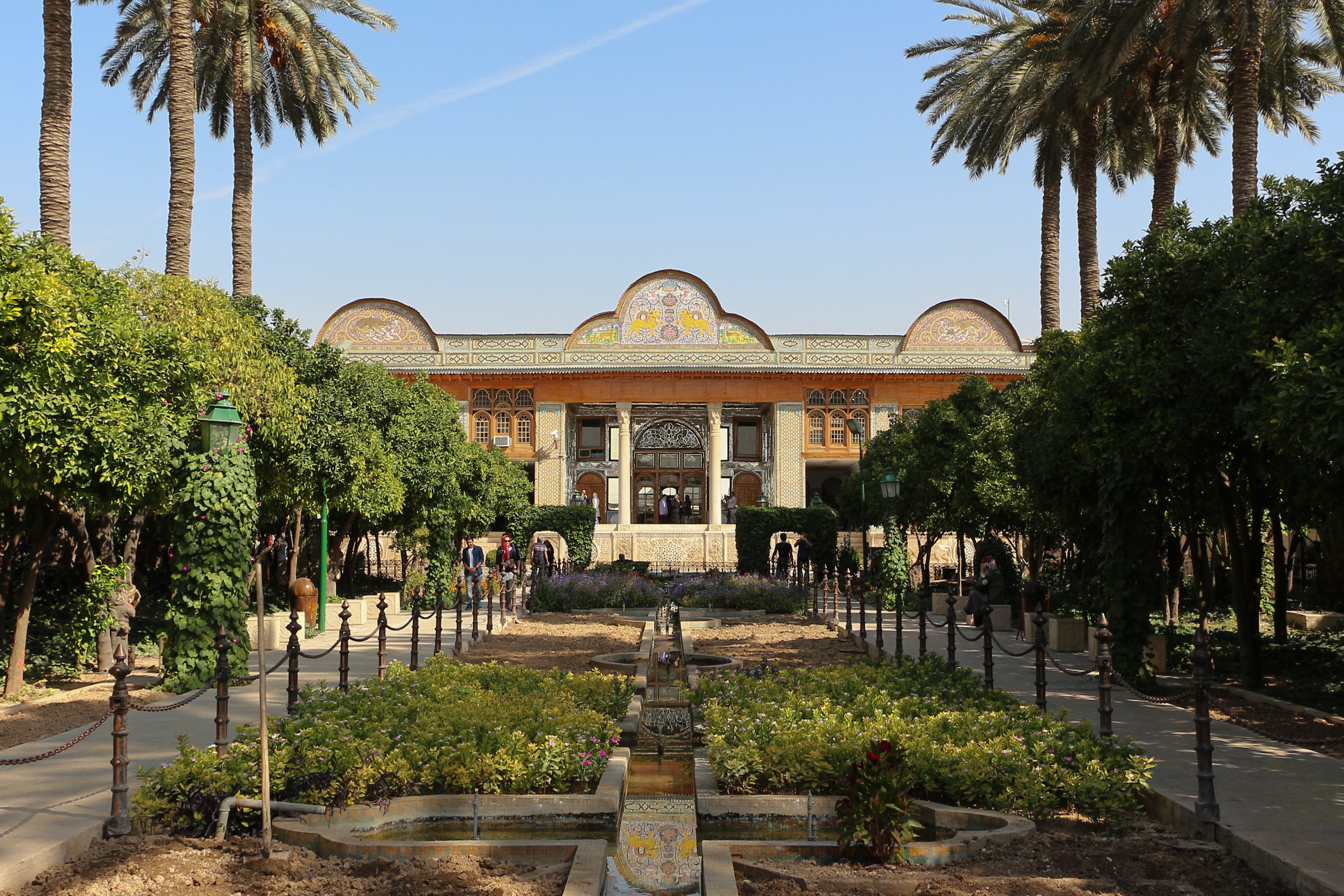
Garden and the building in Spring.

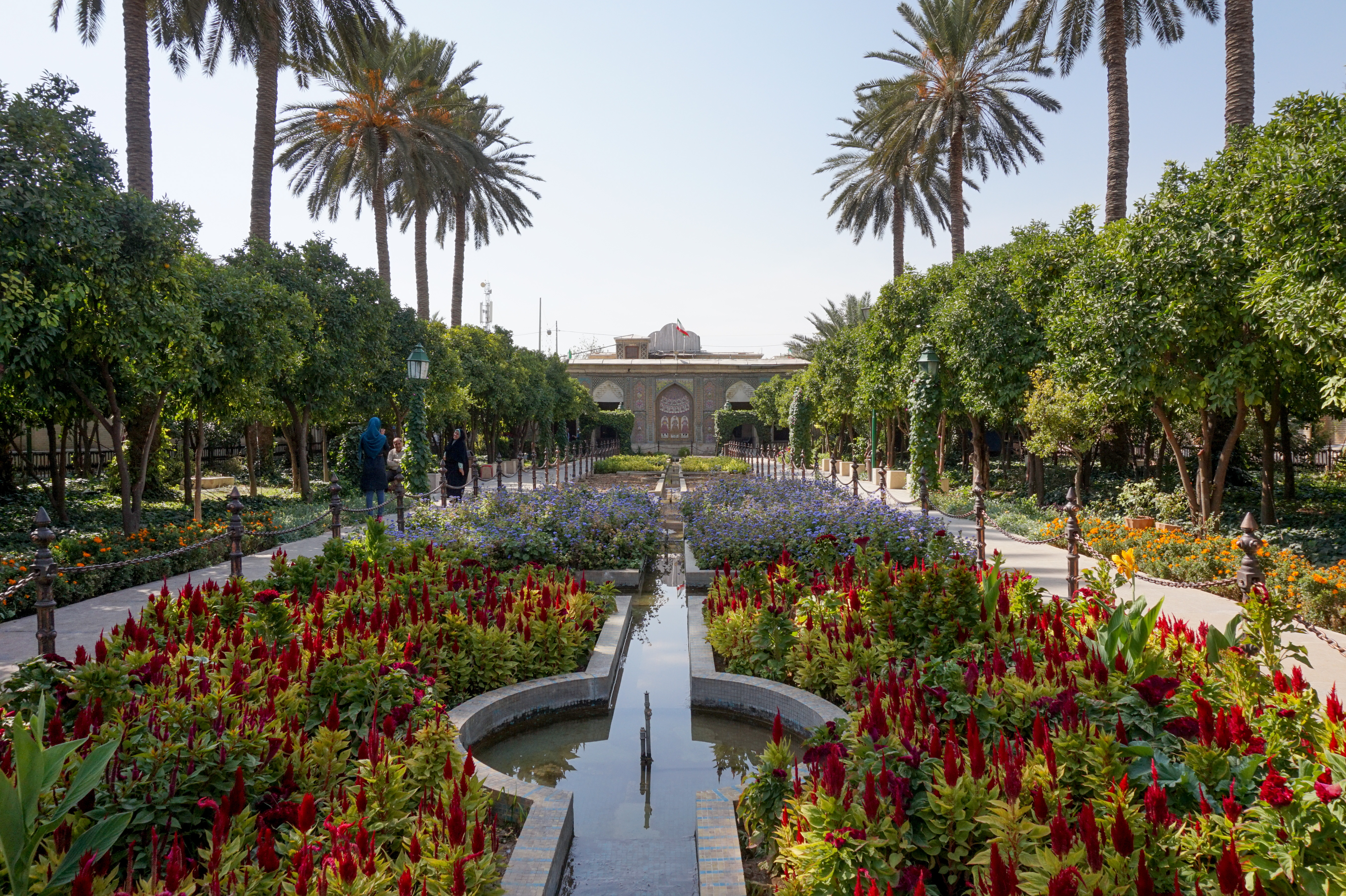
View of the garden from the house.

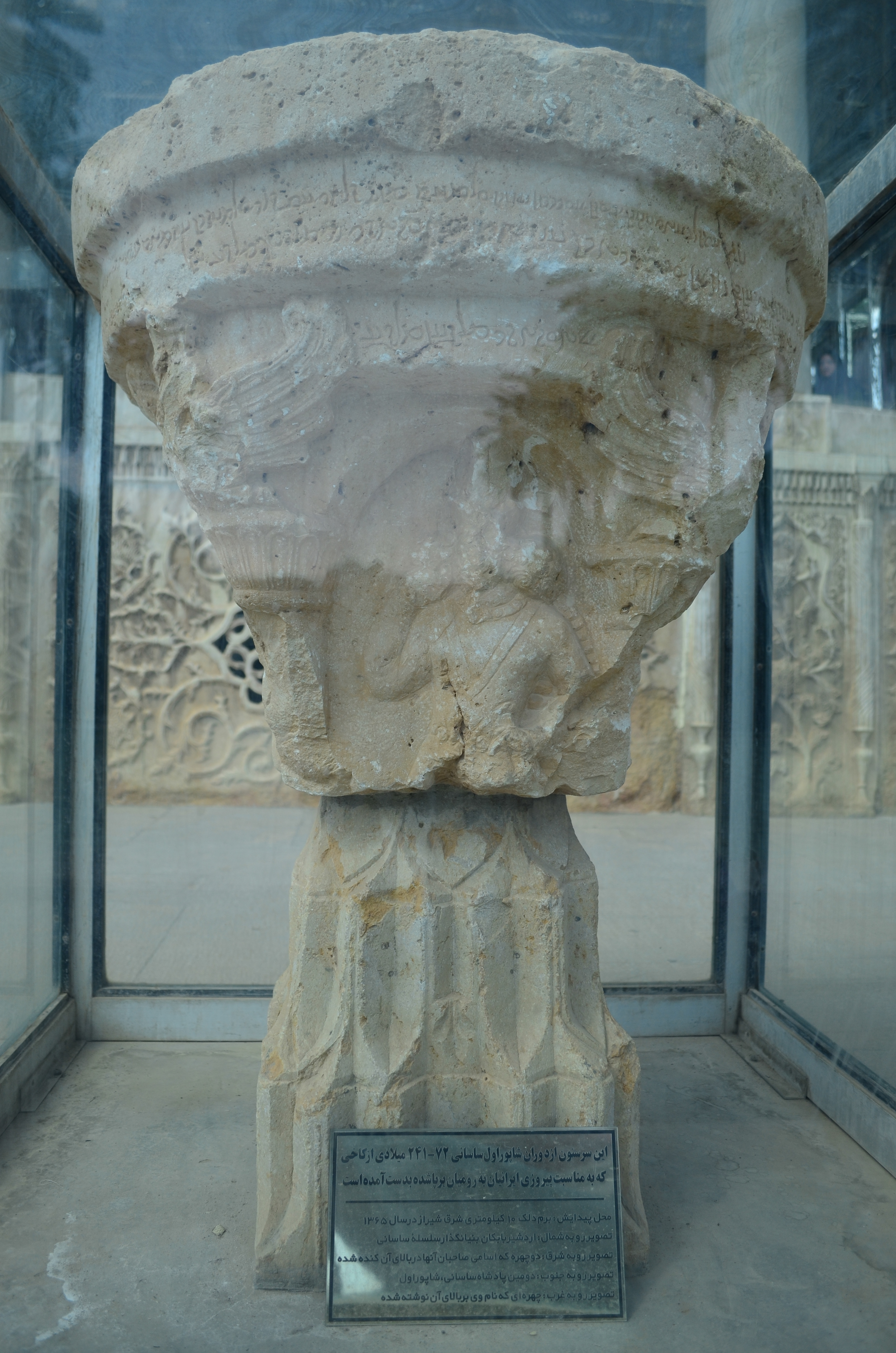
Abnun Fire Pit

== See also ==
- Architecture of Iran
- Eram garden
- Traditional Persian residential architecture
