= Behnam Taebi =

Dutch ethicist and academician

- بهنام تائبی
- Born: Behnam Taebi; 1977 (age 48–49)
- Citizenship: Dutch
- Board member of: Young Academy at Royal Netherlands Academy of Arts and Sciences
- Awards: Netherlands Organization for Scientific Research award

Academic background
- Education: TU Delft

Academic work
- Discipline: Ethycist
- Sub-discipline: Ethics and Technology; Ethics and Nuclear Energy
- Institutions: TU Delft, Harvard University
- Notable works: Ethics and governance of multinational nuclear waste repositories

Behnam Taebi is a Dutch-Iranian ethicist and academician who is known for his research at the interface of Ethics and Nuclear Energy. He is currently an Associate Professor in ethics of technology at Delft University of Technology, and Associate with the Kennedy School's Belfer Center for Science and International Affairs at Harvard University. In 2016, Taebi has been appointed to the Young Academy at the Royal Netherlands Academy of Arts and Sciences.

== Background ==
Taebi studied Material Science and Engineering (2006) and received his Ph.D. in Philosophy of Technology (2010) at TU Delft in the Netherlands. He went to Harvard University in the US to perform his post-doctorate research where he established a firm tie with American research institute in ethical technology. His research interests are in energy ethics, nuclear ethics, responsible research and innovation (RRI) and engineering ethics. Taebi has finished a Veni project (2014-2018) and he is currently working on a joint RRI project on understanding controversies in energy technologies (both projects awarded by the Netherlands Organization for Scientific Research).

== Academic career and coverage ==
His work around the safety and ethical aspects of nuclear energy technology and systems or his contribution in critical nuclear debates have been extensively covered by media outlet in the USA such as New York Times, Huffington Post, Newsweek, Reuters, and academic media such as National Interest and Thomson Reuters Foundation and Carnegie Council and also in the Netherlands media.

== Publication ==
In addition to scholarly articles Taebi published within the ethics and technology, he authored the book 'The Ethics of Nuclear Energy Risk, Justice, and Democracy in the Post-Fukushima Era' published by Cambridge University Press, later became known as a standard text within the field. Taebi is also the author of 'The Morally Desirable Option for Nuclear Power Production (2011)' and the editor of several volumes, including 'The Socio-Technical Challenges of Nuclear Power Production and Waste Management (2015)' and also a co-author for 'Responsible Innovation in Energy Projects: Values in the Design of Technologies, Institutions and Stakeholder Interactions (2015)'.

== See also ==
- Ethics of technology
- Digital ethics
- Engineering ethics
- Philosophy of technology
