= Jamshid Behnam =

Iranian sociologist (1928–2021)

Jamshid Behnam (1928 – 9 November 2021) was an Iranian sociologist, writer, and translator. He is known for his work in the development of sociology and modernization in 20th century–Iran. He was a published author of books on Demographics, Sociology of Iran, Family Structure, and Modernity.

As a sociologist, throughout his career, Behnam collaborated in the work of international sociological and scientific associations. He was a member, holding senior executive positions in the United Nations Educational, Scientific and Cultural Organization (UNESCO), working with the International Social Science Council.

== Personal background ==
Jamshid Behnam was born in 1928 in Tehran, Imperial State of Iran. In 1958, he received his Ph.D. degree in sociology from the Sorbonne (Université René Descartes, Paris-V), where he worked under the supervision of Georges Balandier.

== Professional background ==
Behnam was the founding President and Chancellor of the Farabi Institute of Higher Education affiliated with the International University of Iran and licensed under the Ministry of Science, Research and Technology.

In 1957, Behnam, along with Gholam Hossein Sadiqi, Ehsan Naraghi, Shapour Rasekh formed the first group of French-trained Iranian sociologists. In 1958, they established the Institute for Social Studies and Research (ISSR), initially located at the summer palace of Fat′h-Ali Shah, the King of Qajar dynasty. Attached to the faculty of Social Sciences of Tehran University, the institute was the first research center in Iran.

From 1959 to 1974, Behnam served as the Professor of Demography and Vice President of Tehran University. He was the founder and first head of the Faculty of Social Sciences at Tehran University. He has also worked as the Deputy Secretary General of the World Council of Social Sciences in Paris, and Professor of Sociology at the Paris Descartes University. Jamshid Behnam was the first Secretary-General of the Supreme Council of Culture and Art (SCCA) established in 1967. Behnam was also a member of Ali Mansur's Progressive Circle until it transformed into the Iran Novin Party.

Behnam is known for his critique of Western literary culture and persona, stating that it represents the moral bankruptcy of the Western civilization. He has clarified his understanding of West, stating that it includes "[a]ll countries that have based their economic, social, and political system upon a European civilization that had inherited Greek philosophy, Roman statecraft, and Christian ecclesiasticism." He has further stated that "none of the four mythical characters of Western civilization, that is, Faust, Hamlet, Don Juan, or Don Quixote represent the material spirit of that civilization. Instead, each one of them in wandering in pursuit of a utopian end, totally alien from the economic principles of the West." For the most part, as a result of the writings of Behnam, critique of the West has remained representative of Iranian ethical integrity.

== Published works ==
- Jamshid, Behnam; Jasleen, Dhamija (1978). Living Tradition of Iran's Crafts. ISBN 978-0-706-90728-5.
- Behnam, Jamshid. Tahavolat-e khanevadeh, 2004.
- Behnam, Jamshid (2004). Iranian Va Andisheye Tadjaddod. p. 218. (Farsi Edition)
- Behnam, Jamshid (2000). The Fall of the Shah.
- Behnam, Jamshid (2000). The Berliners (Berlaniha). (Persian/Farsi Edition)
- Behnam, J; Pirani, S (2006). "Iranians and Modern Thought". National Studies Journal. 7 (25): 135–140.
- Behnam, Jamshid. Contemporary Discourse on Modernity in Iran.
- Behnam, Jamshid. Nation-State, Identity and Modernity.
- Behnam, Jamshid. Iranian Society: Modernity and Globalization.
- Behnam, Jamshid. Iranians and Modernism, Tehran: Farzan. Rouz Press, 1996.
- Behnam, Jamshid. Family Events.
- Behnam, Jamshid. Introduction to Sociology.
- Behnam, Jamshid. Bahre Bardiry-e Keshevarzi dar Deh-haye Iran (Agricultural Production in Iranian villages) co-authored with Shapour Rasekh, 1963
- Behnam, Jamshid. An Introduction to Urban Sociology of Iran, 1969
- Behnam, Jamshid. Nazari be Ezdevaj dar Iran (A view of Marriage in Iran), 1960

== See also ==
- Intellectual movements in Iran
