= Pahlavi inscription of Darva =

Sasanian inscription in Fars province, Iran

The Pahlavi inscription of Darva is a Sasanian "Pahlavi" (Middle Persian) inscription located in the hills adjacent to the village of Darva, a district of Zarrin Dasht County in Fars province, Iran.

The inscription was first reported in 2020 by Mirza Mohamad Hassani and Reza Kalani. In 2021, it was registered by Ministry of Cultural Heritage, Tourism and Handicrafts under number 33403.

The inscription has three lines. The three-line inscription is 2.30cm high from the ground, its length is 1.10cm, and its height is 50cm.
