= Sasanian relief =

Looted artefact discovered in England

- Material: Calcareous limestone
- Height: 102 cm (40 in)
- Weight: 81 kg (179 lb)
- Created: early Sasanian period (3rd century AD)
- Period/culture: Sasanian
- Discovered: 1988 or earlier Iran
- Present location: National Museum of Iran
- Culture: Iran (Persia)

A smuggled rock-cut bas-relief of a man from the Sasanian era in Iran was exposed in the UK in 2016. Sharing similarities to other royal Sasanian rock reliefs, it likely depicts a noble man and was probably part of a temple or ossuary in southern Fars dating back to the 3rd century AD.

The relief, before being documented, was smuggled out of Iran in 1988 and was recovered in the United Kingdom in 2016. It is now held in the National Museum of Iran.

== Smuggling and discovery ==
The artifact was gouged from a rock in Iran using an angle grinder and smuggled in 1988 via southern water routes to Sharjah, the United Arab Emirates and then to the United Kingdom. The artifact was intended to be sold in a "well-known" UK internet auction site with the estimated worth of £30,000,000 (equivalent to £31,346,785 in 2025) (equivalent to $37m in 2023) It was accidentally discovered in 2016 by British Border Force in Stansted airport, who seized the artifact and transferred it to the British Museum. Due to poor packaging, the relief was broken in two in shipment from the UAE to the UK. It went under restoration at the British Museum by Tracey Sweek, funded by a private donor. In April 2023, it went on display in the British Museum before being sent to the National Museum of Iran in Tehran on 28 June 2023. It was put on display in Tehran in July 2023.

The case was investigated by Interpol and the National Crime Agency, who worked closely with the Iranian Embassy and the British Museum, though no arrests are reported. According to Simpson, it was the first instance of an antiquity being hacked out of a living rock to be smuggled.

== Description and analysis ==
The artifact and the events leading to its discovery was first described by St John Simpson, the archaeologist at the British Museum. Initial analysis by Simpson's team as well as subsequent XRD and XRF analyses by the National Museum of Iran ruled out rumors regarding it being a modern forgery.

The stone has a height of 102 centimetres (40 in) and weighs 81 kilograms (179 lb).

The artifact is cut from a calcareous limestone (predominantly calcium carbonate) and contains microfossils and aerated pockets. The stone is common throughout Iran, but further analysis of the microfossils can pinpoint the location of origin. Nevertheless, most of the Sasanian reliefs are from the Sasanian homeland of Fars, and a very similar relief can be found in Guyim, Shiraz, belonging to Bahram II. According to Hozhabri et al. (2025), the area of origin may have been the Jereh area.

There are indications that the relief had been exposed to the elements for considerable time. Nevertheless, the fact that it had been unrecorded before smuggling suggests that it might have been buried by colluvial activity and accidentally discovered, e.g. through stone quarrying or construction, when the relief was carefully cut.

The relief was carved using a tooth or claw chisel. There is no trace of stucco underlay for pigments.

The relief depicts a man, probably a high-ranking courtier or prince, in a respectful posture (showing respect to a sacred fire, the emperor, or the remains of someone). The depiction is somewhat unique in that the figure is standing under an arch supported by two columns; the only other known Sasanian depiction of people with architectural elements is that of Taq-e Bostan. Comparison with other Sasanian reliefs suggest it probably dates back to 3rd century AD, and possibly carved during the reign of Bahram II. The relief was apparently part of a cubical structure (rather than being embedded in a mountain, as typical of similar Sasanian reliefs). The relief was probably part of a fire temple or an astōdān. Due to the posture, there should have been another relief opposite this relief, possibly a Zoroastrian divinity, a Sasanian emperor, or a Zoroastrian symbol (such as atar).

Another unique feature is that the perspective is deliberately foreshortened, making it disproportionate when looked at eye height, but compensated when looked from below.

== See also ==
- Sassanid Archaeological Landscape of Fars Region
