= Inscription of Shapur II and Shapur III at Taq-e Bostan =

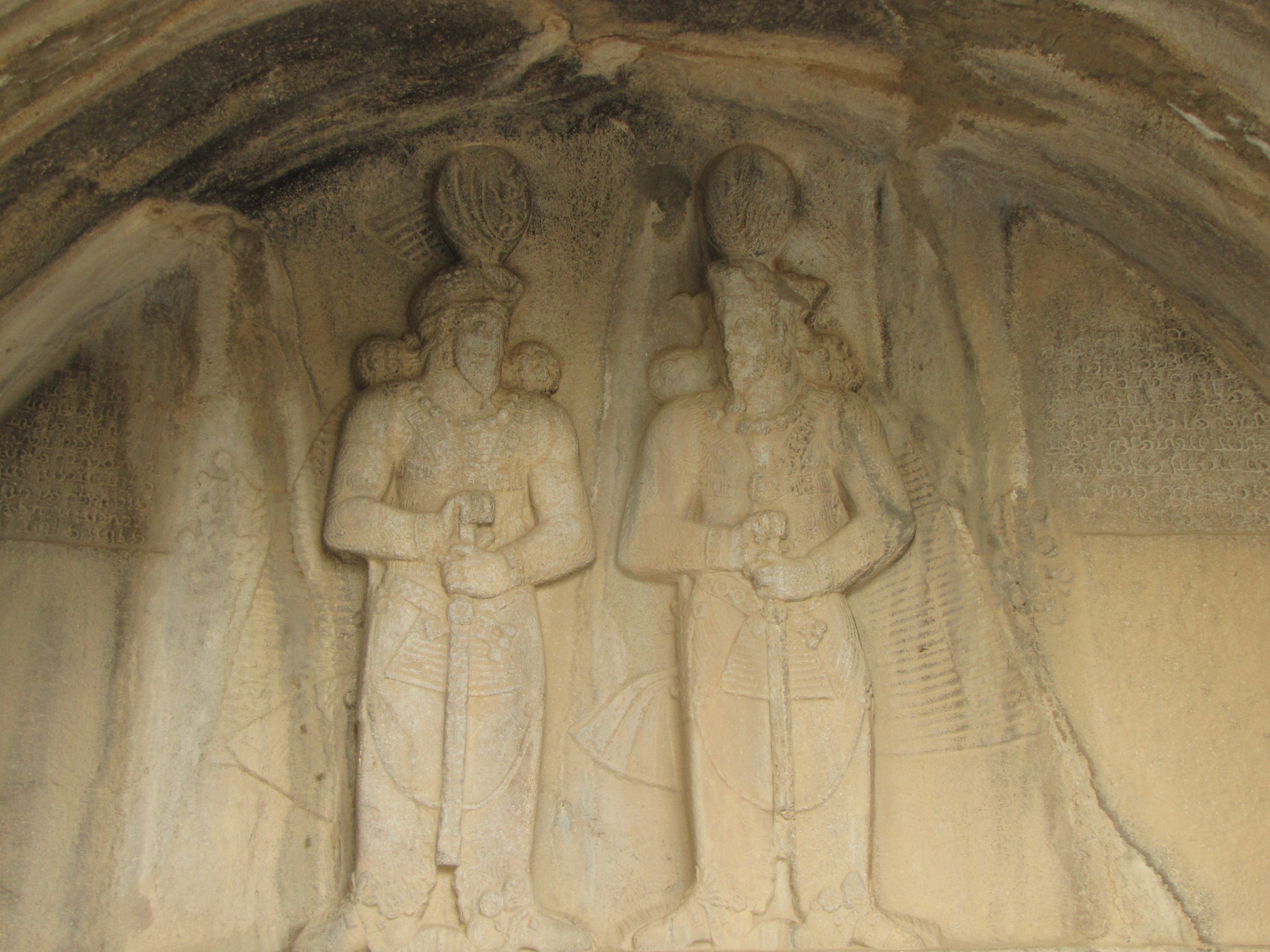
Shapour III (left) and Shapour II (right).

The inscriptions of Shapur II the Great and Shapur III at Taq-e Bostan, are located about 5 kilometers away from the northeast of Kermanshah and date to the Sasanian era. The inscription shows Shapur II on the right and Shapur III on the left. Two inscriptions in Middle Persian are etched on both sides. The inscriptions contain their names and their lineages. The inscription of Shapur II contains 9 lines and the inscription of Shapur III contains 13 lines.

== Sources ==
- Canepa, Matthew P. (2013). "Sasanian Rock Reliefs". In Potts, Daniel T. (ed.). The Oxford Handbook of Ancient Iran. Oxford University Press. ISBN 9780199733309.
- Canepa, Matthew P. (2018). "Earthly Paradises". The Iranian Expanse: Transforming Royal Identity through Architecture, Landscape, and the Built Environment, 550 BCE–642 CE. University of California Press. pp. 1–512. ISBN 9780520964365.
