= Index of Sasanian Empire–related articles =

This is an alphabetical index of people, places, things, and concepts related to or originating from the Sasanian Empire (224–651). Feel free to add more, and create missing pages.

== A ==
- Aba I
- Abarsam
- Abdon and Sennen
- Adarmahan
- Adergoudounbades
- Adhar Valash
- Adhur Gushnasp
- Adi ibn Zayd
- Adur-Anahid
- Adurfrazgird
- Afrig
- Ahudemmeh
- Amargar
- Amazasp III of Iberia
- Anak the Parthian
- Anastasian War
- Anastasius of Persia
- Andarzaghar
- Anoshazad
- Antiochus (praepositus sacri cubiculi)
- Aparviz of Sakastan
- Aphrahat
- Apranik
- Apursam-Shapur
- Ardashir I
- Ardashir II
- Ardashir III
- Ardashir (king of Marv)
- Ardashir I Kushanshah
- Arsacid dynasty of Caucasian Albania
- Arvand Gushnasp
- Ashtat Yeztayar
- Aspacures I of Iberia
- Aspad Gushnasp
- Aswagen
- Ayadgar-i Zariran
- Azadbeh
- Azad Peroz
- Azarethes
- Azarmidokht
- Azen Gushnasp

== B ==
- Babak (Sasanian officer)
- Baduspanids
- Bahram I
- Bahram II
- Bahram III
- Bahram IV
- Bahram V
- Bahram Chobin
- Bahram Gushnasp
- Balendukht
- Balkh
- Barzabod
- Boran
- Bozorgmehr

== C ==
- Chihor-Vishnasp
- Ctesiphon

== D ==
- Dabuyid dynasty
- Drustbed

== E ==
- Eulamius

== F ==
- Farn-Sasan

== G ==
- Gubazes II of Lazica

== H ==
- Herat
- Hormizd I
- Hormizd II
- Hormizd III
- Hormizd IV

== I ==
- Iberia (Caucasus)
- Iberia, Principate of
- Iberia, Sasanian
- Iberian War
- Ispahbudhan, House of
- Istakhr
- Izadgushasp

== J ==
- Julian (emperor)
- Justinian I

== K ==
- Karen, House of
- Kavad I
- King of Kings
- Klimova Treasure
- Korymbos
- Kushano-Sasanian Kingdom
- Khwaday-Namag

== L ==
- Lakhmids
- Lazica
- Lazic War

== M ==
- Mahbod (envoy)
- Maskut
- Maurice (emperor)
- Mihr-Mihroe
- Mihran, House of
- Mihranids of Gugark
- Mirian III of Iberia
- Mushegh I Mamikonian

== N ==
- Nabedes
- Nachoragan
- Nahrawan Canal

== O ==
- Ostandar

== P ==
- Parthian Empire
- Peroz I
- Peroz I Kushanshah
- Persecution of Zoroastrians
- Persis, Kings of
- Phocas

== Q ==
- Qazvin
- Qumis

== R ==
- Ray

== S ==
- Šahrestānīhā ī Ērānšahr
- Sagdukht
- Sasanian dress
- Sasanian economy
- Sasanian roads
- Sebukht
- Shahrbaraz
- Shapur III
- Sogdia
- Stephen I of Iberia
- Suren, House of

== T ==
- Tammisha
- Tawwaj

== V ==
- Vahan Mamikonian
- Vakhtang I of Iberia
- Valerian (emperor)
- Varsken

== W ==
- Wahrez

== Y ==
- Yazdegerd I
- Yazdegerd II

== Z ==
- Zanjan
- Zoarab
