= Administrative divisions of the Sasanian Empire =

Political aspect of the Sasanian Empire

The administrative divisions of the Sasanian Empire were administrative divisions of the state organisation of the Sasanian Empire.

== Administration ==
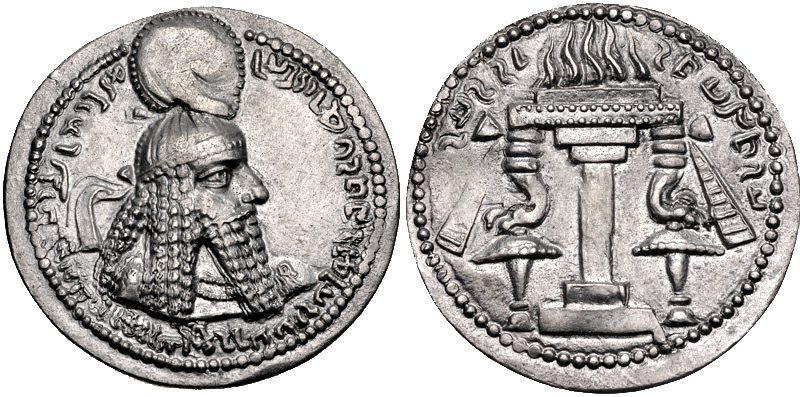
Coin of Ardashir I, the founder of the Sasanian Empire

On his coinage, the first Sasanian King of Kings (shahanshah) Ardashir I (r. 224–242), introduces himself as King of Kings of a realm that he identified as Eran. His son and successor Shapur I (r. 240–270) calls himself King of Kings of Eran and Aneran in his SKZ inscription. According to the inscription, Eran was made up of the following provinces (shahr in Middle Persian):

...Pars, Partaw (Pahlaw), Huzistan, Meshan, Asurestan, Nodshiragan (Adiabene), Arabestan, Adurbadagan (Azerbaijan), Armen (Armenia), Wirzan (Iberia), Sagan, Ardan (Albania), Balasagan up to the Kaf (Caucasus) Mountains and to the Alanan Gate and all of the Parishkhwar (Alborz) mountains, Mah (Media), Gurgan, Marγ, Harew, Abarshahr, Kirman, Sagestan (Sistan), Turestan, Makuran, Paradan, Hindestan, (India), Kushanshahr up to Pashkabur (Peshawar) and Kash, Suγd, Chach (Tashkent), and the lands of Mazun (Oman) on the other side of the sea.

A similar list is mentioned in the Ka'ba-ye Zartosht of the 3rd-century Zoroastrian priest Kartir. The provinces of the late Sasanian realm are listed in the Bundahishn and Vendidad. Provinces were split into smaller administrative divisions, particularly the khwarrah (same origin as the Iranian/Zoroastrian concept khwarrah, "glory/fortune"), rostag or tasug (districts), and dehs (villages). These divisions were not always used all over the realm, and records of other units are known, such as an awestam, which was ostensibly akin to a shahr and was administered by an awestamdar.

During the reforms of Kavad I (r. 488–496, 498–531) and his son and successor Khosrow I (r. 531–579), the provinces were grouped into four frontier regions (kusts), with a marshal (spahbed) in charge of each district; a chancery was also added to keep the soldiers equipped. Before Kavad and Khosrow's reforms, the Iranians' general (Eran-spahbed) managed the empire's army. A new priestly office was also created known as the "advocate and judge of the poor" (driyōšān jādag-gōw ud dādwar), which assisted the clergy to help the poor and underprivileged (an obligation they had possibly ignored previously).

== Hierarchical list of Sasanian administrators and their level of authority ==
According to modern historian Negin Miri, the list of Sasanian administrators and their level of authority presented in a hierarchical model was the following:

Administrative division	Administrative official
Region encompassing several provinces	zarrbed waspuhragan-framadar amargar
province (shahr)	shahrab ostandar mowbed driyoshan-jadaggow ud dadwar gund-i-kadag-khwadaygan framadar framadar darigbed amargar andarzbad
district (rostag/tasug)	maguh, dadwar
village (deh)	dehgan, darig

== Sources ==
- Axworthy, Michael (2008). A History of Iran: Empire of the Mind. New York: Basic Books. pp. 1–368. ISBN 978-0-465-00888-9.
- Daryaee, Touraj (2014). Sasanian Persia: The Rise and Fall of an Empire. I.B.Tauris. pp. 1–240. ISBN 978-0857716668.
- Miri, Negin (2012). "Sasanian Pars: Historical Geography and Administrative Organization". Sasanika: 1–183.
- Miri, Negin (2013). "Sasanian Administration and Sealing Practices". In Potts, Daniel T. (ed.). The Oxford Handbook of Ancient Iran. Oxford University Press. ISBN 978-0199733309.
- Schindel, Nikolaus (2013a). "Kawād I i. Reign". Encyclopaedia Iranica, Vol. XVI, Fasc. 2. pp. 136–141.
- Schindel, Nikolaus (2013b). "Sasanian Coinage". In Potts, Daniel T. (ed.). The Oxford Handbook of Ancient Iran. Oxford University Press. ISBN 978-0199733309.
