= Book Pahlavi =

Cursive Middle Iranian script

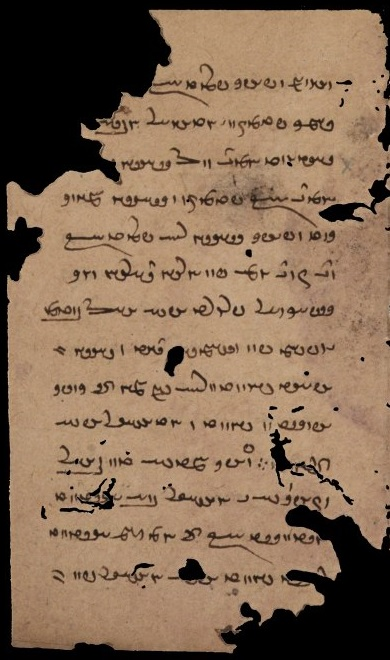
- Page from the codex MK, copied in 1322.
- Script type: Abjad with heterograms
- Period: c. 3rd century – c. 11th century AD
- Direction: Right-to-left
- Languages: Middle Persian language

Related scripts
- Parent systems: Egyptian hieroglyphs: Proto-Sinaitic; Phoenician alphabet; Aramaic alphabet; Pahlavi scripts; Book Pahlavi
- Child systems: Avestan

ISO 15924
- ISO 15924: Phlv, 133

Book Pahlavi is the cursive variant of the Pahlavi script, which was derived from the Aramaic script during the Sassanid period to write the Middle Persian language. Book Pahlavi was used primarily for writing books and documents, especially Zoroastrian works in Pahlavi, but later also for inscriptions.

Book Pahlavi is an abjad, meaning there are no unique vowel symbols, although it does make use of matres lectionis. Much like rasm in the Arabic script, a single letterform can be used for multiple letters, as they merged over time. (To avoid confusion, these are still usually transliterated differently.) Further ambiguity is added by the fact that the boundaries between letters are not clear, and many letters look identical to combinations of other letters. Like other variants of Pahlavi, many Aramaic-language heterograms (Middle Persian huzwāreš; also called "Aramaeograms") are used in Book Pahlavi texts. In transliteration, these are written as capital letters to differentiate them from Middle Persian words.

The Avestan script was derived from Book Pahlavi as a phonetic alphabet with 52 characters (including 15 vowel characters) in order to compile the traditional sacred texts of the Avesta into a book. Sometimes, Middle Persian can be written in the Avestan script, where it is referred to as Pazend.

== Letters ==
Book Pahlavi letters and their transliterations
Letter name	Letter	in Middle Persian words		in heterograms
Letter name	Image	Transliteration	transcription	Transliteration
Aleph	Aleph	ʼ	(zero), ā, a	A
Heth	Aleph	h	h, x	Ḥ / H
Beth	Bet	b	b	B
Gimel	Gimel	g	g	G
Daleth	Gimel	d	d, y	D
Yodh	Gimel	y	y, j, ē, ī, e, i	Y
Hē	He	(Note: only used in heterograms.)		H / E
Waw	Waw	w	w, ō, ū, o, u	W
Nun	Waw	n	n	N
Ayin	Waw			ʿ / O
Resh	Waw	r	r	R
(otiose sign)	Waw	^{|}	(Note: the otiose sign is a silent sign identical to Waw, Nun, Ayin, and Resh that can mark the end of the word.)	^{|}
Zayin	Zayin	z	z	Z
Kaph	Kaph	k	g, k, γ	K
Old Kaph	Old Kaph	k	g, k, γ	K
Lamedh	Lamedh	l	r, l	L
hooked Lamedh	old Lamedh			L
stroked Lamedh	stroked Lamedh	ɫ	l	(Note: only used in Middle Persian words.)
Mem	Mem	m	m	M
Qoph	Mem			Q
Samekh	Samekh	s	s, h	S
Pe	Pe	p	b, p, f	P
Sadhe	Tsade	c / ṣ	č, z, j	Ṣ / C
Shin	Shin	š	š, j	S
Taw	Taw	t	d, t	T

=== Ligatures ===
Unlike other Pahlavi scripts, Book Pahlavi features extensive ligatures. Many letters take on descending forms before the letters aleph-heth, gimel-daleth-yodh, pe, sadhe, and taw.

=== Gallery ===
The word Ērān-šahr, spelled ʼylʼnštr^{|} 'land of the Aryans', in Book Pahlavi.

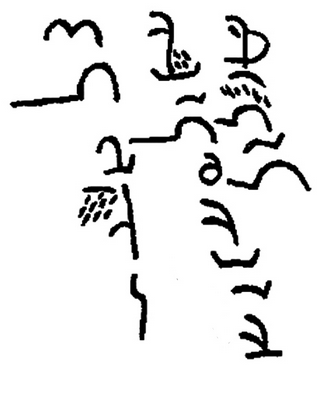
Tracing of a mid-6th century Sasanian inscription from the northern city wall of Darband. It is written in a cursive (top-to-bottom, left-to-right) script close to that of Book Pahlavi, but with some forms typical of Inscriptional Pahlavi inscriptions. (Note: dly[w]š ZY / [ʾt]wr[p]ʾtkʾn / ʾm[ʾ]lkl Dari[u]š ī / [Ād]ur[b]ādagān / ām[ā]rgar 'Dariuš, āmārgar [chief fiscal officer] of Ādurbādagān' (in inscriptional Pahlavi: 𐭣𐭫𐭩[𐭥]𐭱 𐭦𐭩 \ [𐭠𐭲]𐭥𐭥[𐭯]𐭠𐭲𐭪𐭠𐭭 \ 𐭠𐭬[𐭠]𐭫𐭪𐭫 ).)

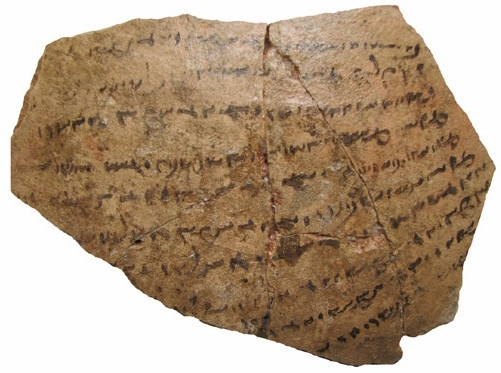
Late Sasanian ostracon with Book Pahlavi writing. Found at Qaleh Iraj in Varamin.

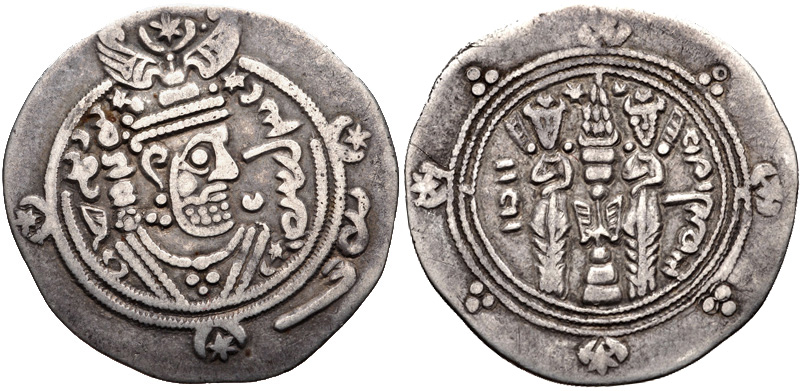
Coin of Khurshīd, Ispahbad of Tabaristan (r. 740–760).

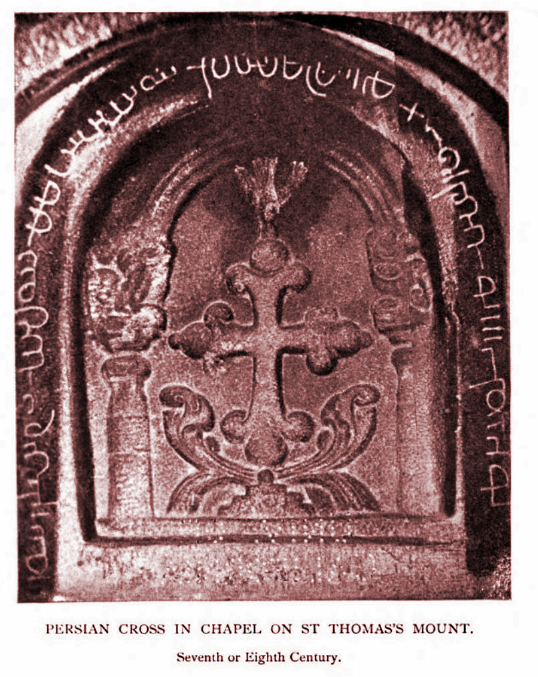
7th or 8th century Saint Thomas stone cross at St Thomas mount, Chennai, Tamil Nadu, India.

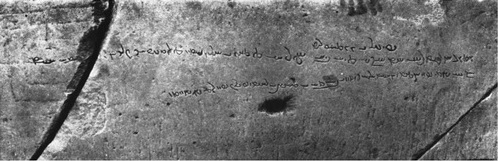
New Persian tomb inscription of Khurdād in Constantinople, 8th to 10th century.

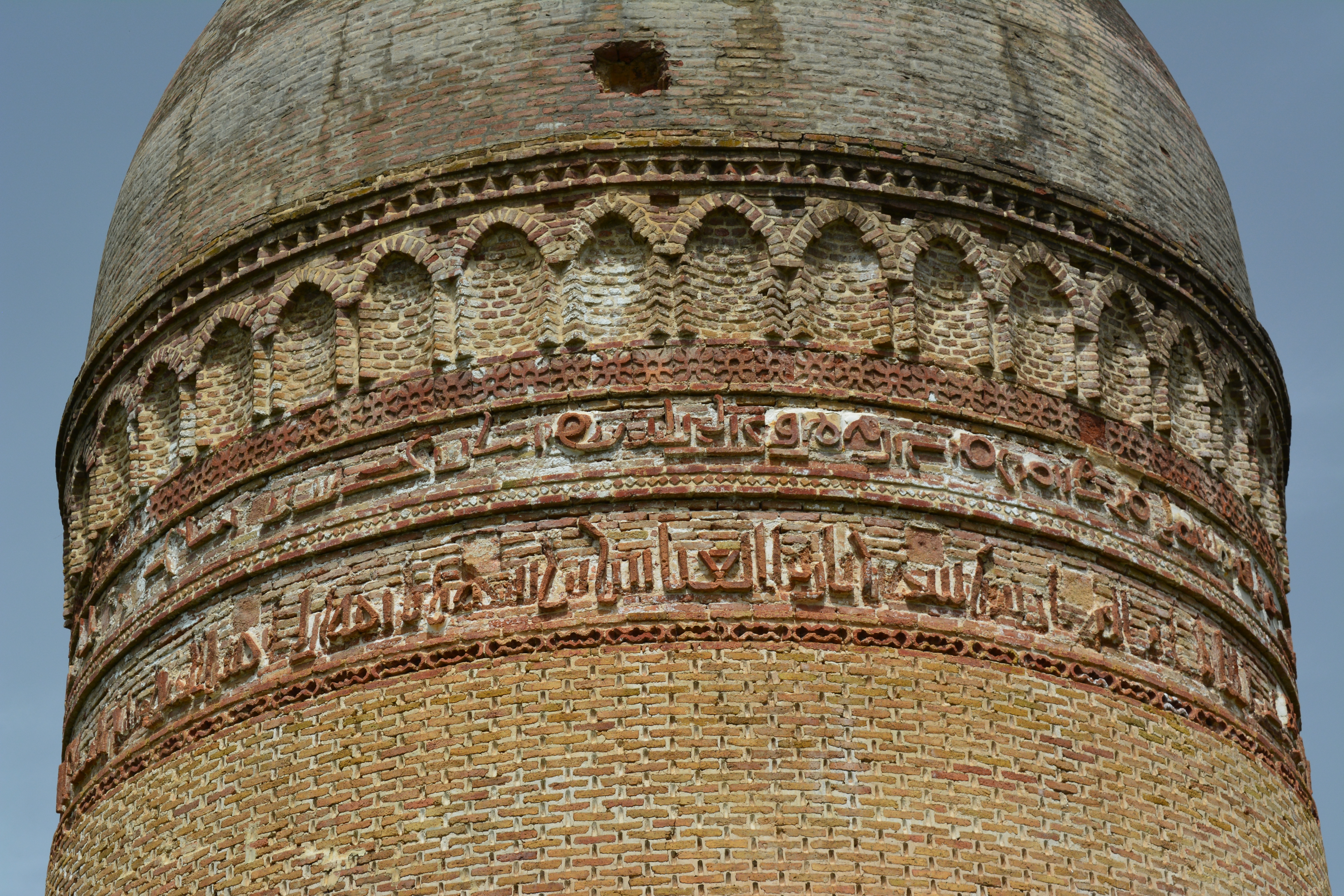
A tomb tower in Lajim, dated 1022/23, with its upper Middle Persian inscription in a script derived from Book Pahlavi.

== See also ==
- Heterogram (linguistics)
- Rasm
- Inscriptional Parthian
- Inscriptional Pahlavi
- Psalter Pahlavi
- Pazend
- Avestan alphabet
- Manichaean script
- Middle Persian literature
