= Economic history of Iran =

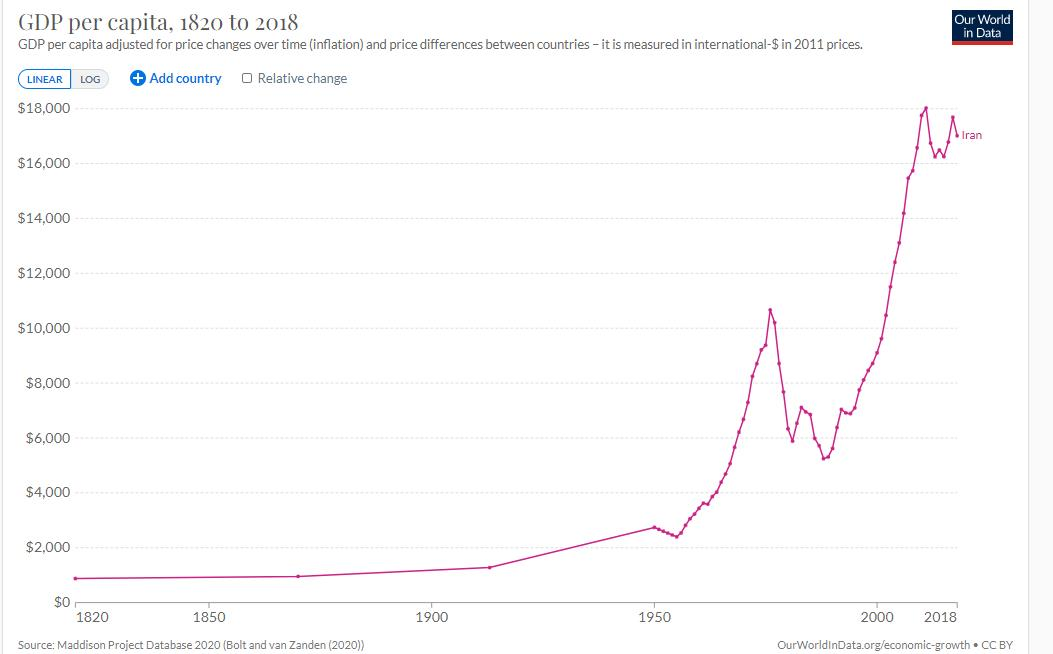
Historical GDP per capita development in Iran

Prior to 1979, Iran's economic development was rapid. Traditionally an agrarian society, by the 1970s the country had undergone significant industrialization and economic modernization. This pace of growth had slowed dramatically by 1978 as capital flight reached $30 to $40 billion 1980 US dollars just before the revolution.

After the Revolution of 1979, Iran's government proceeded with 4 reforms:

1. First they nationalized all industry, including the NIOC, and all Iranian banks.
2. The new Constitution divided the economy in 3 different sectors, namely "State", "Cooperative" and "Private", with the majority being state-owned businesses.
3. The Government started using central planning to control the economy, having the Supreme Leader, the President and Majlis creating 5-year socio-economic plans.
4. The State took control of setting prices and subsidies.

The government's long-term objectives since the revolution have been economic independence, full employment, and a comfortable standard of living for citizens, but at the end of the 20th century, the country's economy faced many obstacles. Iran's population more than doubled between 1980 and 2000 and grew increasingly younger. Although a relatively large number of Iranians are farmers, agricultural production has consistently fallen since the 1960s. By the late 1990s, Iran had become a major importer of food. At that time, economic hardship in the countryside resulted in vast numbers of people moving to cities.

The eight-year war with Iraq claimed at least 300,000 Iranian lives and injured more than 500,000. The cost of the war to the country's economy was some $500 billion. After hostilities with Iraq ceased in 1988, the government tried to develop the country's communication, transportation, manufacturing, health care, education and energy sectors (including its prospective nuclear power facilities), and began the process of integrating its communication and transportation infrastructure with that of neighboring states.

== Pahlavi Era (1925–79) ==
Reza Shah Pahlavi (r. 1925–41) improved the country's overall infrastructure, implemented educational reform, campaigned against foreign influence, reformed the legal system, and introduced modern industries. During this time, Iran experienced a period of social change, economic development, and relative political stability.

In the interwar period, modern industries were introduced. Whereas fewer than 20 modern industrial plants existed in 1925, by 1941 more than 800 new plants had been established, with the intention of reducing the country's dependence on imports. The state encouraged industrialization by raising tariffs, financing modern industries, and imposing government monopolies. Changes in the legal system, tax structure, and trade policies attracted domestic financial resources and led to the emergence of a group of new, young entrepreneurs. The shah's court became the biggest investor in the new industries. Primarily by confiscating real estate, the shah himself became the country's richest man. Increased investment in mining, construction, and the manufacturing sector occurred, and infrastructure investment grew significantly. Iran had only 250 kilometers of railroads and 2,400 kilometers of gravel roads in 1925; by 1938 these totals had increased to 1,700 and 12,000 kilometers, respectively. Industrial growth was not balanced, however. Integration among sectors and industries was absent, and the new industries met only part of the growing domestic demand. Agriculture, from which 90 percent of the labor force made its living, did not benefit from economic reform. Furthermore, the expanding areas of the economy were not labor-intensive. Modern sectors (Caspian Sea fisheries, railroads, seaports, the oil industry, modern factories, and coal fields) absorbed a total of only about 170,000 workers, less than 4 percent of the labor force.

The government managed the expansion of international trade by techniques such as the foreign exchange controls imposed in 1936. Many new items were among the imported goods required by industry, the military, railroads, and other areas of infrastructure investment. Traditional agricultural and industrial export products were replaced by oil exports. Germany became Iran's primary trading partner by 1940, accounting for 42 percent of its foreign trade; the United States was second, with 23 percent. The Soviet Union also was a major trading partner in this period. Despite many advances in domestic and foreign economic policy, however, Iran remained an exporter of raw materials and traditional goods and an importer of both consumer and capital goods in the years before World War II.

Reza Shah Pahlavi, who abdicated in 1941, was succeeded by his son, Mohammad Reza Shah Pahlavi (r. 1941–79). In 1951, Prime Minister Mosaddegh nationalized the Iranian oil industry. The UK responded with an oil embargo on Iran, and eventually, with the US, backed a successful coup against Prime Minister Mosaddegh in 1953. After the western removal of the democratically elected government of Iran, between 1954 and 1960 a rapid increase in oil revenues and sustained western foreign aid led to greater investment and fast-paced economic growth, primarily in the government sector. Subsequently, inflation increased, the value of the national currency (the rial) depreciated, and a foreign-trade deficit developed. Economic policies implemented to combat these problems led to declines in the rates of nominal economic growth and per capita income by 1961.

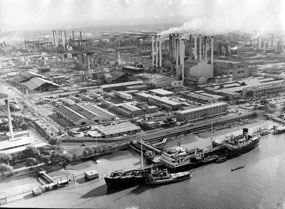
Abadan Refinery, built 1913.

In response to these setbacks, Iran initiated its third economic development plan (1962–68) with an emphasis on industrialization. New economic policies significantly altered the role of the private sector. The expansion of private and public banks, as well as the establishment of two specialized banks, provided reliable credit markets for medium- and large-scale private manufacturing enterprises. Not limited to cheap credit, government programs also included a wide range of incentives to encourage investment in new industries by both Iranian and foreign businesses. Most new investment was a joint effort between either the public sector and foreign investors or private businesses and foreign corporations. Investment in roads, highways, dams, bridges, and seaports also increased. With government support, part of the agricultural sector also attracted significant investment. Many large-scale agricultural operations in meat, dairy products, and fruit production were established. Small-scale farmers, however, did not benefit from the new investment opportunities.

Under the fourth and the fifth economic development plans (1968–73; 1973–78), the Iranian economy became increasingly open to imports and foreign investment. A combination of oil revenues, public spending, and foreign and domestic investments enlarged the middle class in major cities, particularly Tehran. In the wake of the spike in crude oil prices that followed the 1973 war pitting Egypt and Syria against Israel, the process of industrialization and consumption grew rapidly. Between 1973 and 1977, the specialized banks provided more than 200 billion rials to the manufacturing sector, and the increase in investment averaged 56 percent per year. A flood of imported goods and raw materials overwhelmed the capacity of seaports and warehouses. The military was also a beneficiary of the new economic and social conditions. Military personnel, modern artillery and equipment, and military training absorbed a major part of the budget.

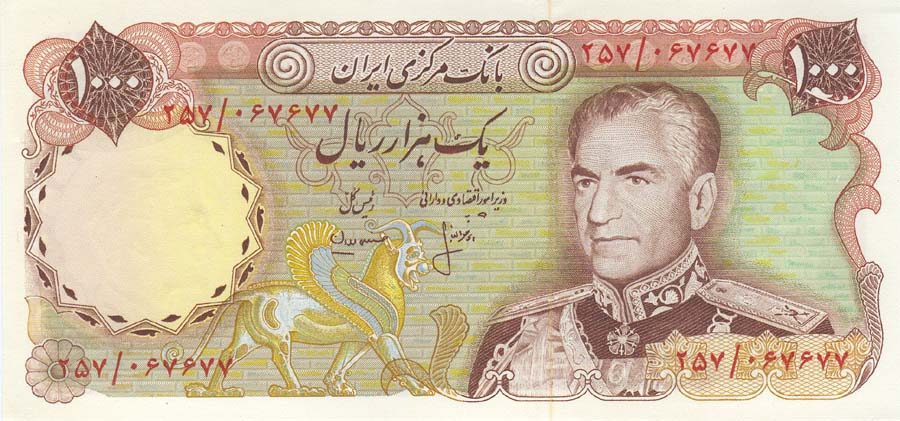
Shah's portrait at the 1000 Iranian rial bank note

Between fiscal year 1964 and FY 1978, Iran's gross national product grew at an annual rate of 13.2 percent at constant prices. The oil, gas, and construction industries expanded by almost 500 percent during this period, while the share of value-added manufacturing increased by 4 percent. Women's participation in the labor force in urban areas increased. Large numbers of urban Iranian women, from varying social strata, joined the semiskilled and skilled labor forces. In addition, the number of women enrolling in higher education increased from 5,000 in FY 1967 to more than 74,000 in FY 1978.

Economic growth, however, became increasingly dependent on oil revenues in the 1970s. By 1977, oil revenues had reached US$20 billion per year (79 percent of total government revenues). Other sectors of the economy and regions of the country did not experience a uniform pattern of growth during this period. Agriculture, traditional and semi-traditional industries, and the services sector did not thrive to the same extent as the “modern” state-sponsored manufacturing industries, which accounted for only 6 percent of industrial employment. As employment opportunities in rural areas and traditional industries decreased, public employment in urban areas increased. The proportion of self-employed Iranians remained stable.

Accelerated development of the middle class was a major outcome of the 1960s and 1970s. Among this class were the new professional intelligentsia, called motekhassesin (experts). Their common denominator was the professional, cultural, or administrative expertise acquired through modern education. Nevertheless, the patterns of economic growth and regional development along with the political underdevelopment of the shah's regime in areas such as civil institutions, human rights, and property rights limited opportunities for the majority of Iranians to develop fully their social and economic potential. Economic and social polarization minimized competition among businesses and limited development to the part of the economy concerned with the interests of dominant groups closely tied to the shah's court and the state. Most Iranians were excluded from political and economic decision making.

== After the 1979 revolution ==
GDP per capita (1950–2018)

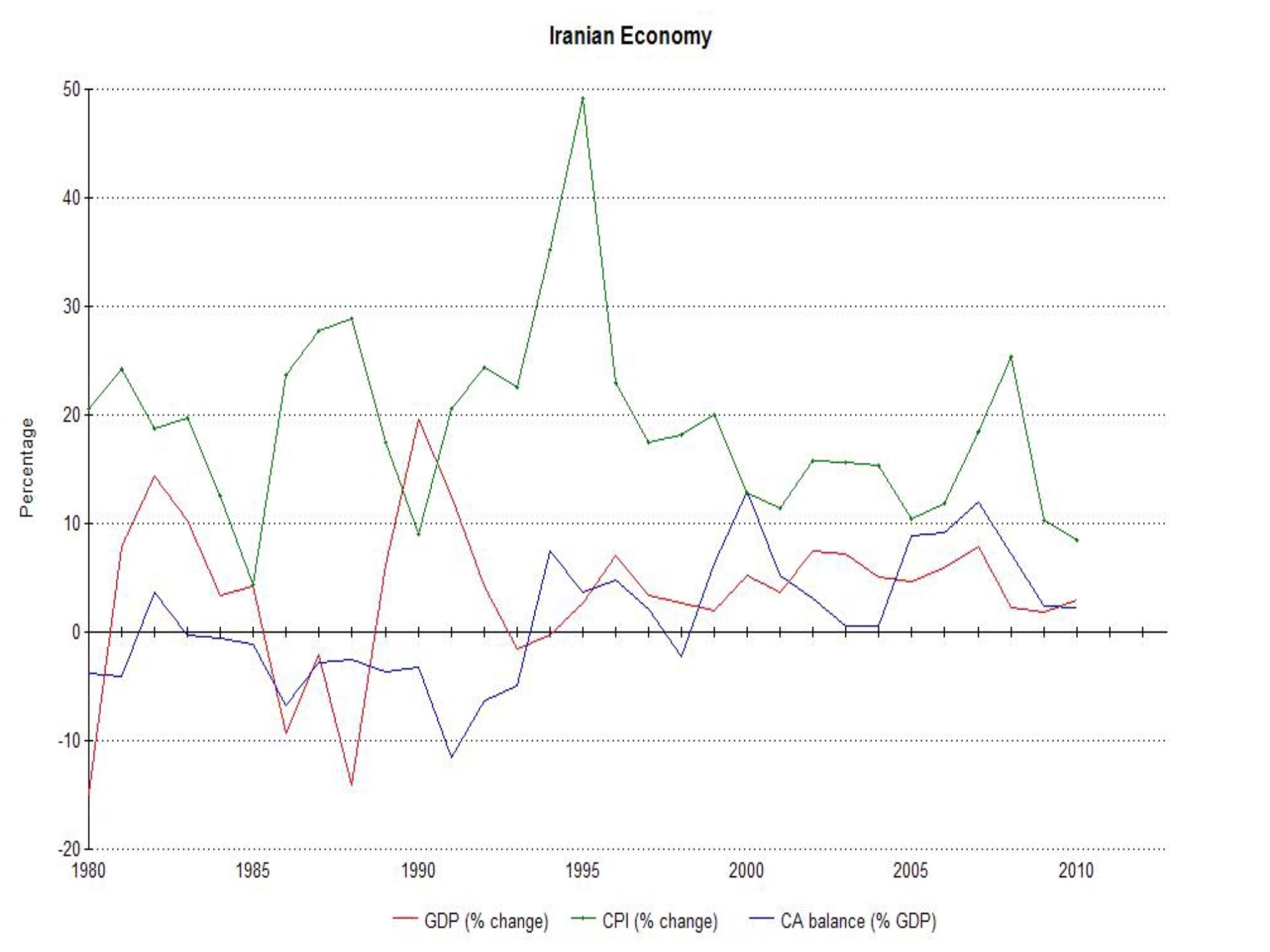
Iran: GDP, CPI and Current account data (1980–2010)

According to the 1979 Iranian Constitution, it is the duty of the Islamic government to furnish all citizens with equal and appropriate opportunities, to provide them with work, and to satisfy their essential needs, so that the course of their progress may be assured. Iran's long-term objectives since the 1979 revolution have been economic independence, full employment, and a comfortable standard of living for citizens, but at the end of the 20th century, the country's economic future faces many obstacles. Iran's population more than doubled in a 20-year period, with an increasingly young population. Although a relatively large part of the population engages in farming, agricultural production has fallen consistently since the 1960s. By the late 1990s, Iran was a major food importer, and economic hardship in the countryside had driven vast numbers of people to migrate to cities.

The rates of literacy and life expectancy in Iran are high for the region, but so is the unemployment rate, and inflation is in the range of 20% annually. Iran remains highly dependent on one major industry, the extraction of petroleum and natural gas for export, and the government faces increasing difficulty in providing opportunities for a younger, better educated workforce. Such lack of opportunities has led to a growing sense of frustration among lower- and middle-class Iranians.

Following the nationalizations in 1979 and the outbreak of the Iran–Iraq War, over 80% of Iran's economy came under the control of the government. After the end of hostilities with Iraq in 1988, the government tried to develop the country's communication, transportation, manufacturing, health care, education and energy infrastructures (including its prospective nuclear power facilities) and has begun the process of integrating its communication and transportation infrastructure with that of neighboring states. It is estimated that Iran sustained a loss of $500 billion through the Iraq war.

In 1996, the U.S. Government passed the Iran and Libya Sanctions Act (ILSA) which prohibits U.S. (and non-U.S. companies) from investing and trading with Iran for more than $20 million annually, with the exception, since 2000, for items like pharmaceuticals, medical equipment.

=== Overview of Iran's successive economic plans (1991–2010) ===
| Plans (main data sources: Iranian Parliament & Ministry of Commerce) | 1991–2001 (achieved) | 2005–10 (target) | 2009–10 (achieved) |
|---|---|---|---|
| Number of articles to be implemented in the plan | —N/a | 290 | 117 |
| Economic growth | 3.9% on average | 8% on average | 6.3% on average (2006–10) |
| Liquidity growth | 27.3% on average | <20% on average | 33% on average |
| Inflation | 23% on average | <10% on average | 16% on average |
| Unemployment rate | —N/a | 11% by 2010 | 12% on average (2005–10) |
| Jobs creation per year by 2010 | —N/a | 848,000 jobs/year | 725,000 jobs/year |
| Labor productivity growth | 1.3% on average | 3.5% | —N/a |
| Investment growth | 4.3% on average | 12.2% | —N/a |
| Population growth | 1.5% on average | 1.4% | —N/a |
| Non-oil export growth | 5.6% on average | 10.7% | —N/a |
| Technology access index | —N/a | 0.45 | 0.26 |
| Ratio of research expenditures to GDP | 0.4% (2001) | 2.5% | 0.87% |
| Ratio of high-tech exports to total non-oil exports | —N/a | 6 | 2 |
| New oil and gas fields discovered (2005–10) | —N/a | —N/a | 19 new oilfields and eight new gas reserves |
| Ratio of the expenditures of top 10% to bottom 10% households | 19.4 (2001) | —N/a | 14 |
| Gini coefficient | 0.43 (2001) | —N/a | 0.38 according to government |
| Social welfare index | 423 (2001) | —N/a | 800 |
| Population below the poverty line (the middle 50%) | 15% (2001) | —N/a | 7% according to government |
| Penetration rate – mobile users | —N/a | 50% | 60% (2009) |
| Fixed telephone lines | —N/a | 36 million fixed lines | 24.8 million (2008) |
| Internet users | —N/a | 30 million users | 23 million (2008) |

=== Socio-economic development plan (2010–2015) ===
Fifth Economic Development Plan (2010–15)
| Item | 2010 (achieved) | 2010–15 (target) |
|---|---|---|
| GDP world ranking | 18th largest economy by PPP | 12th in 2015; Goldman Sachs estimate: 12th by 2025 |
| Annual growth rate | 2.6% | 8% on average (based on $1.1 trillion domestic and FDI); BMI forecast: 3.6% on average (2009–14) |
| Unemployment | 11.8% according to government; unofficially: 12–22%; 30% according to opposition | 7% by 2015, by creating 1 million new jobs each year |
| Inflation rate | 15% (as of January 2010) | 12% on average |
| Value Added Tax | 3% | 8% |
| Privatization | —N/a | 20% of state-owned firms to be privatized each year |
| Share of cooperative sector (% GDP) | < 5% | 25% |
| R&D (% GDP) | 0.87% | 2.5% |
| Share of non-oil exports | 20% | 30% ($83 billion) by 2016 |
| Oil price & revenues in budget | $60 per barrel | $65 per barrel on average / $250 billion in oil and gas revenues in 2015 once the current projects come on stream; International Monetary Fund projections: ~$60 billion only |
| National Development Fund | —N/a | 30% of oil revenues to be allocated to the National Development Fund by 2015 |
| Oil production | 4.1 million bpd | 5.2 million bpd (with some 2,500 oil and gas wells to be drilled and commissioned) |
| Natural gas production | —N/a | 900 million cubic meter/day |
| R&D projects in oil industry | —N/a | Implementation of 380 research projects by 2015 covering the enhancement of the recovery rate, gas conversion and hydro conversion |
| Investment in oil and gas industry | —N/a | $20 billion a year in private and foreign investment, in part to boost oil refining capacity |
| Petrochemical output | ~50 million tpy | 100 million tpy |
| Bunkering | 25% market share in Persian Gulf | 50% market share or 7.5 million tpy of liquid fuel |
| Oil products storage capacity | 11.5 billion liters | 16.7 billion liters |
| Natural gas storage capacity | —N/a | 14 billion cubic meters |
| Electricity generation capacity | 61,000 MW | 86,000 MW |
| Efficiency of power plants | 38% | 45% |
| Investment in mining and industry | —N/a | $70 billion/700,000 billion rials |
| Crude steel production | ~10 million tpy | 42 million tpy by 2015 |
| Iron ore production | ~27 million tpy | 66 million tpy by 2015 |
| Cement | ~71 million tpy | 110 million tpy |
| Limestone | —N/a | 166 million tpy |
| Industrial parks | —N/a | 50 new industrial parks to be built by 2015 |
| Ports capacity | 150 million tons | 200 million tons |
| Railways | 10,000 kilometers | 15,000 kilometers by 2015 at a cost of $8 billion per annum |
| Transit | 7 million tons | 40 million tons of goods |
| Electronic trade | —N/a | 20% of domestic trade, 30% of foreign trade and 80% of government transactions to be made electronically |

=== Historical economic charts ===
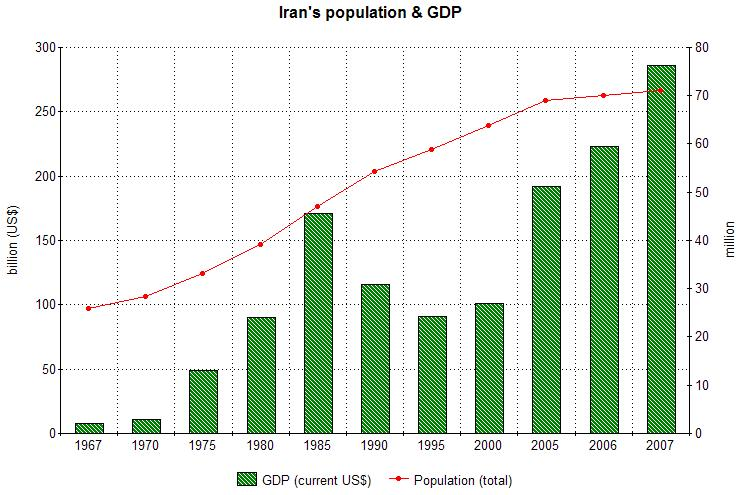
Iran's GDP and population growth (from 1967 until 2007)

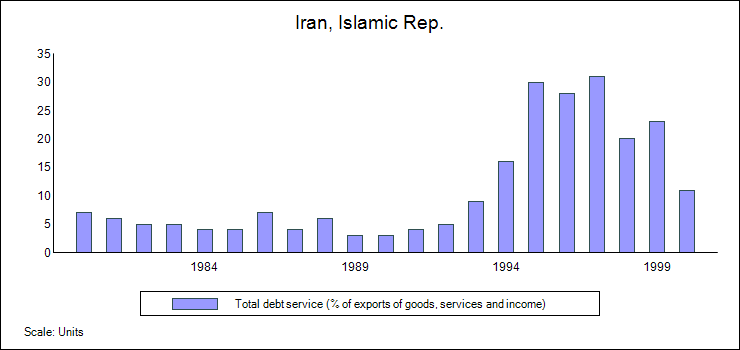
Iran's total debt service as percent of exports of goods services and income increased sixfold between 1990 and 1997

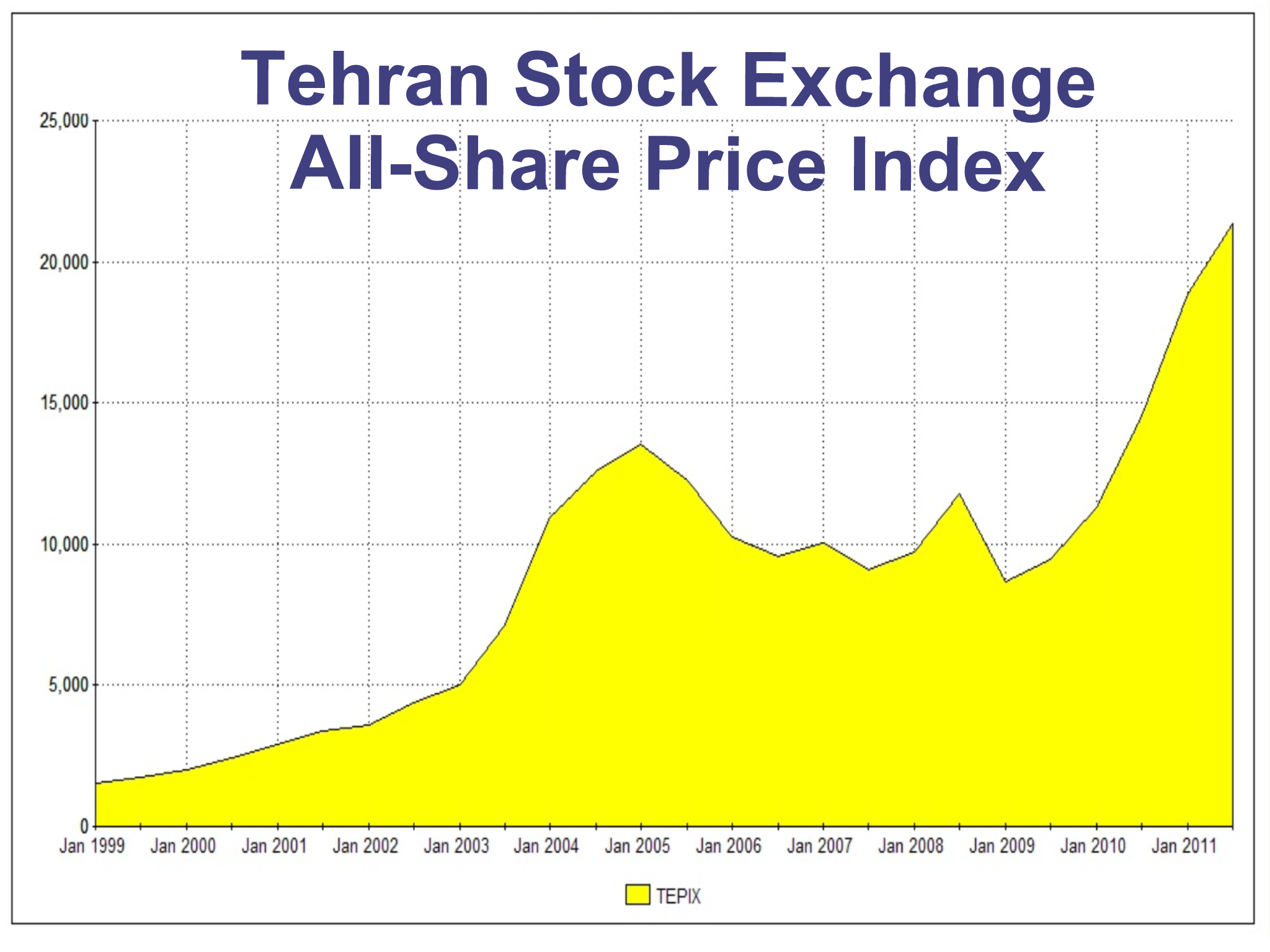
Between March 2001 and April 2003, the TSE index (Tepix) bucked the trend by going up nearly 80%

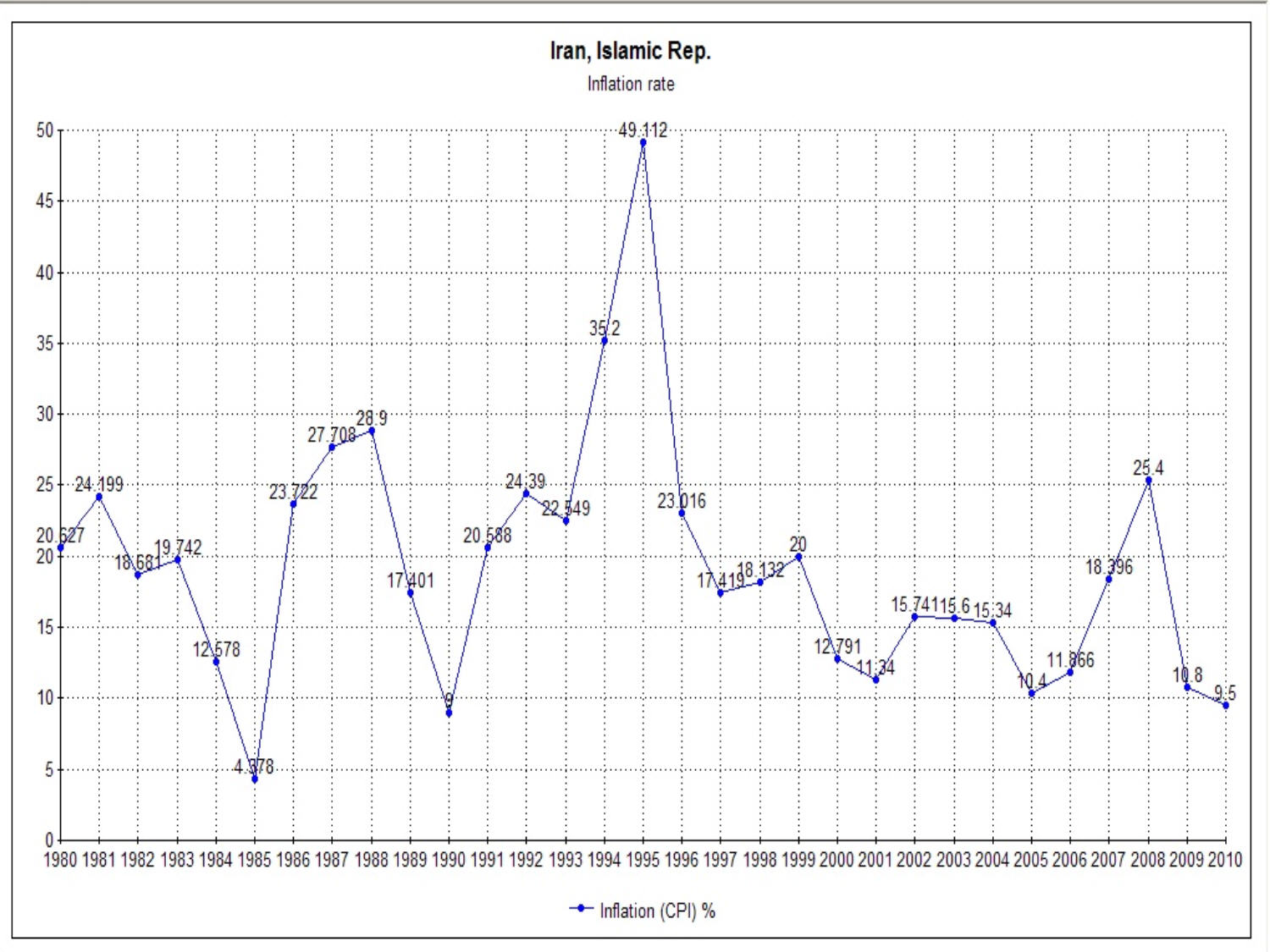
Between 2002 and 2006, the rate of inflation in Iran has been fluctuating between 12 and 16%.

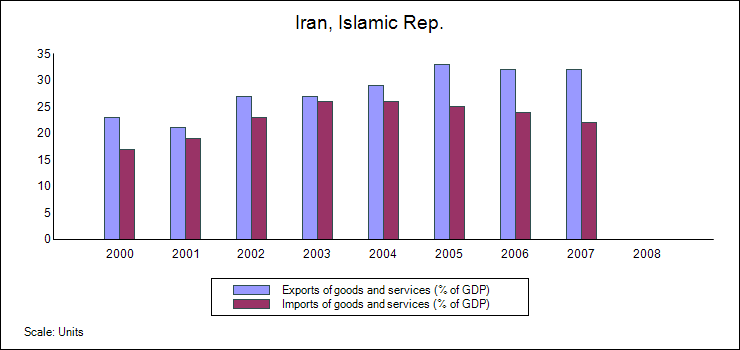
Iran's trade balance (2000–2007)

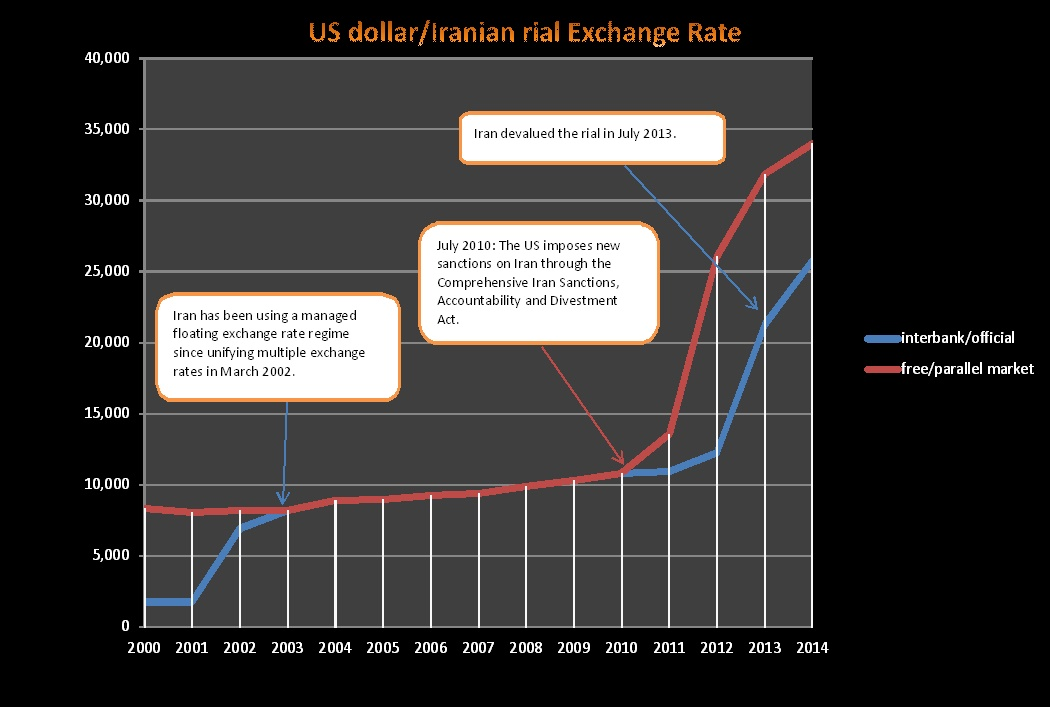
US dollar/Iranian rial historical exchange rates (2003–2013)

Iran's population reached 70 million in 2006. More than half of the Iranians are under the age of 30, and the literacy rate stands above 80%.

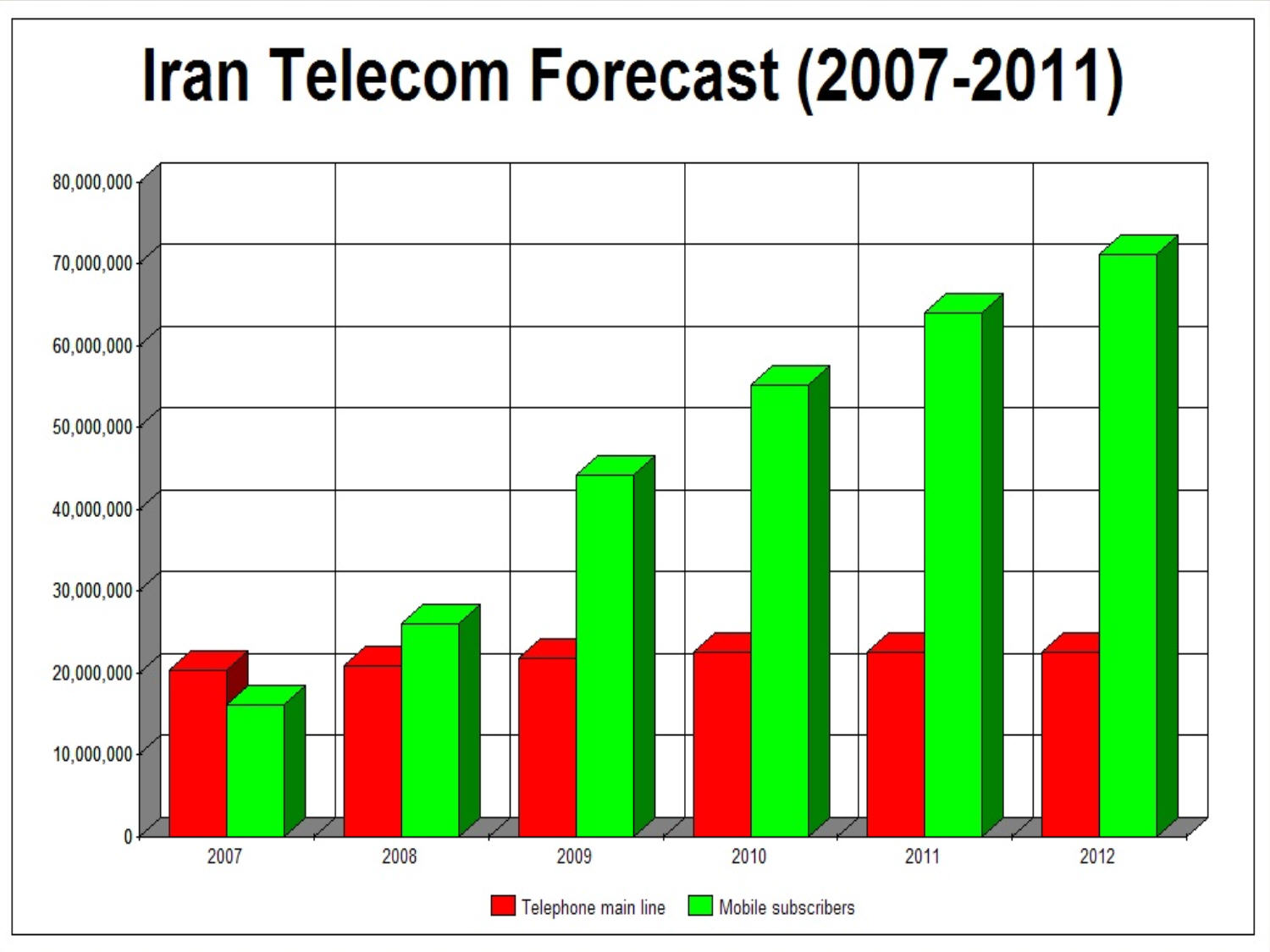
Iran is among the first five countries which have had a growth rate of over 20% and the highest level of development in telecommunication.

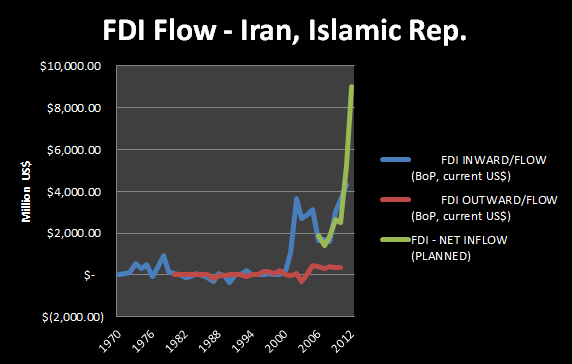
Foreign Direct Investment in Iran (1970–2012)

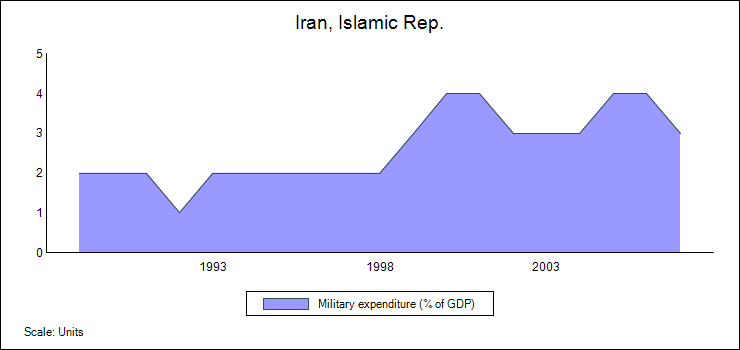
Iranian military expenditures (1989–2007)

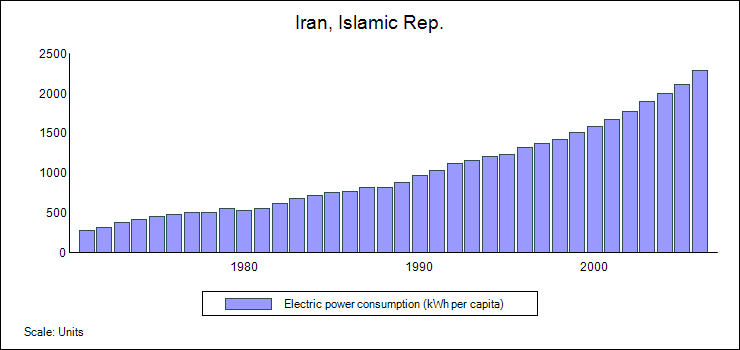
Energy consumption in Iran is 6.5 times that of global average.

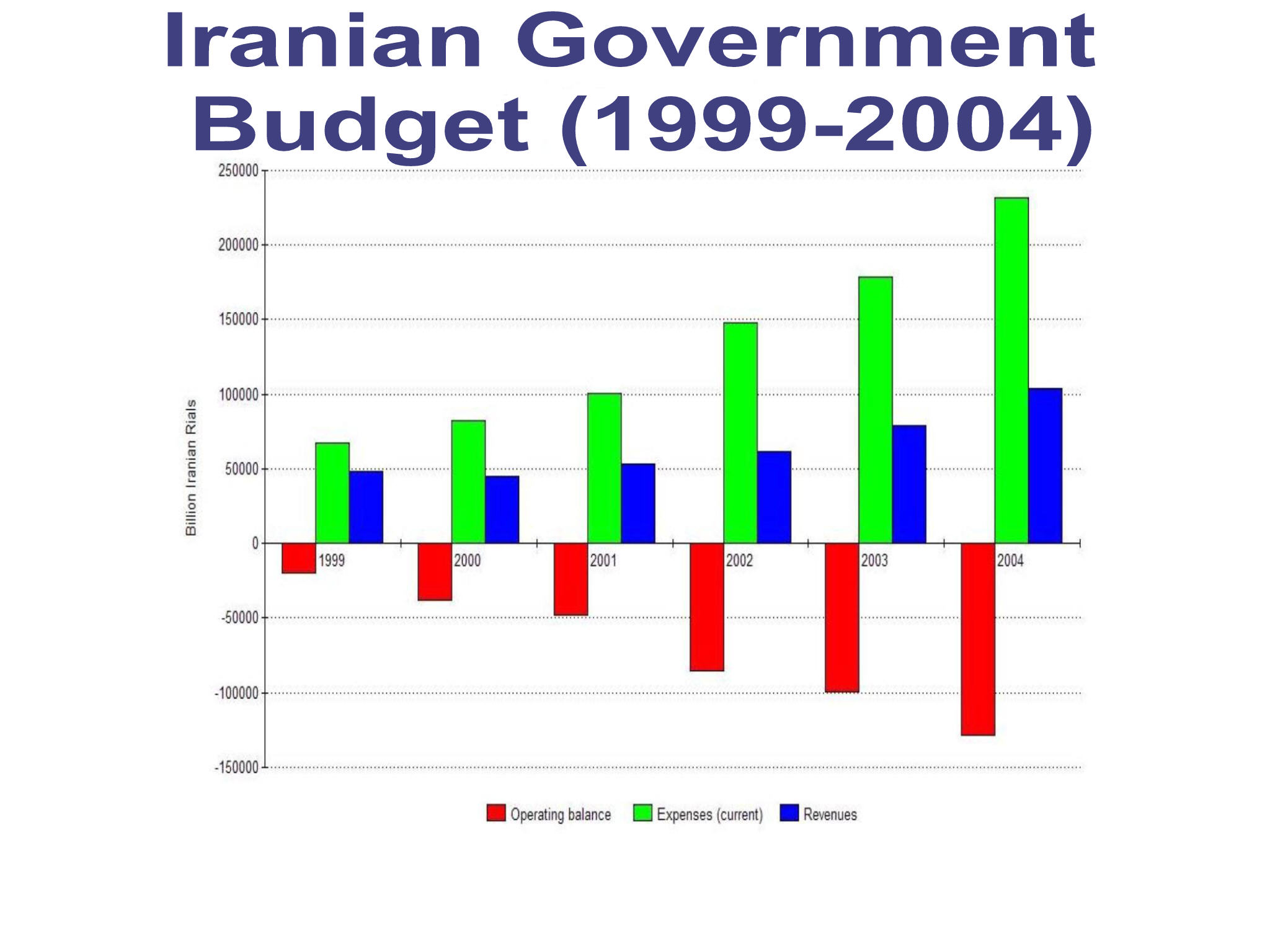
Iranian Government budget (1999–2004)

Provinces of Iran by contribution to national GDP (2014)

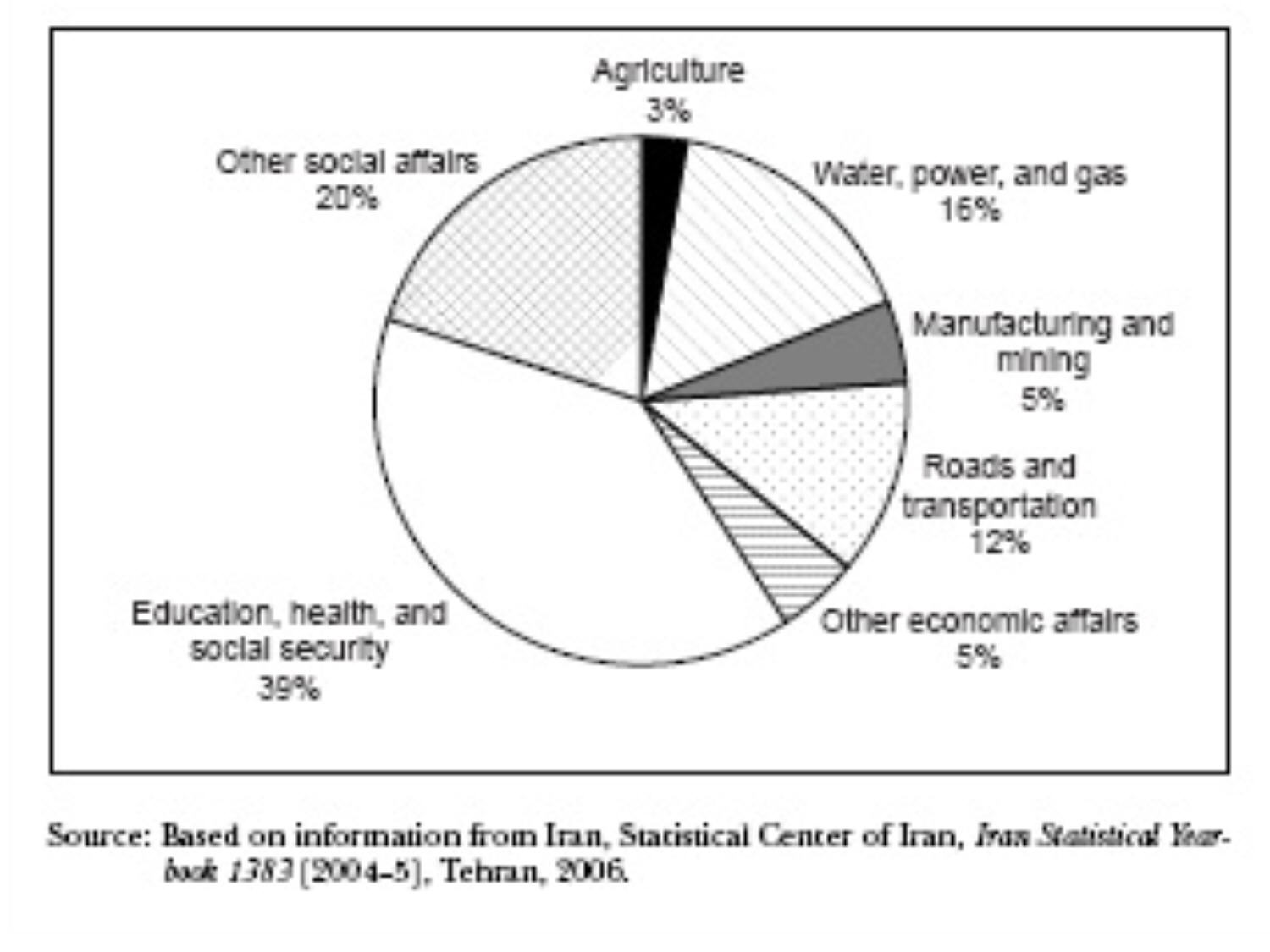
Socioeconomic expenditures (2004)

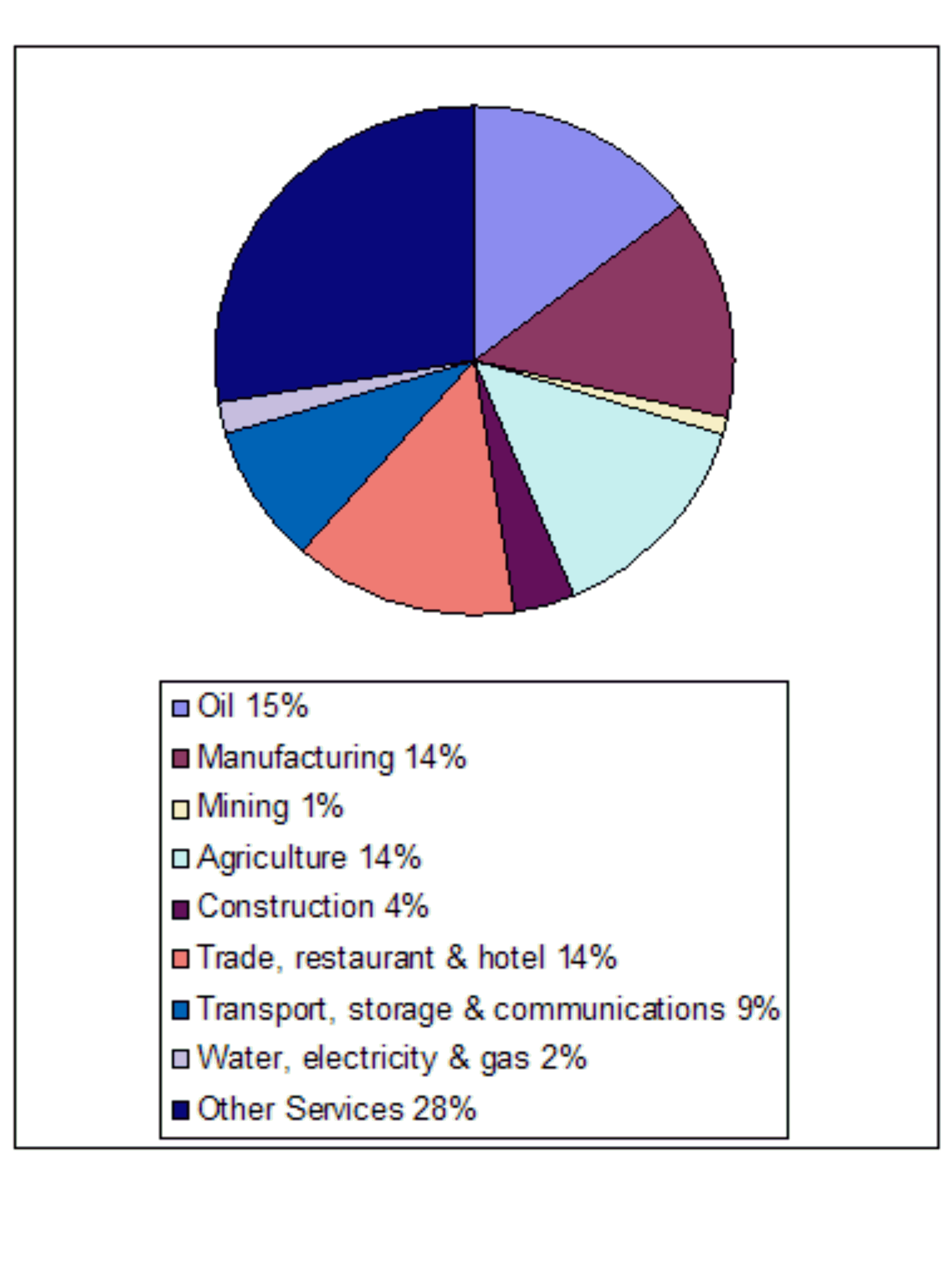
Economic sectors (2002)

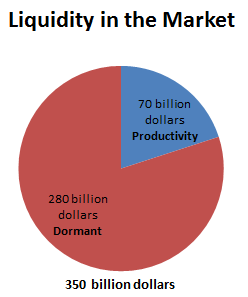
Market liquidity (2012)

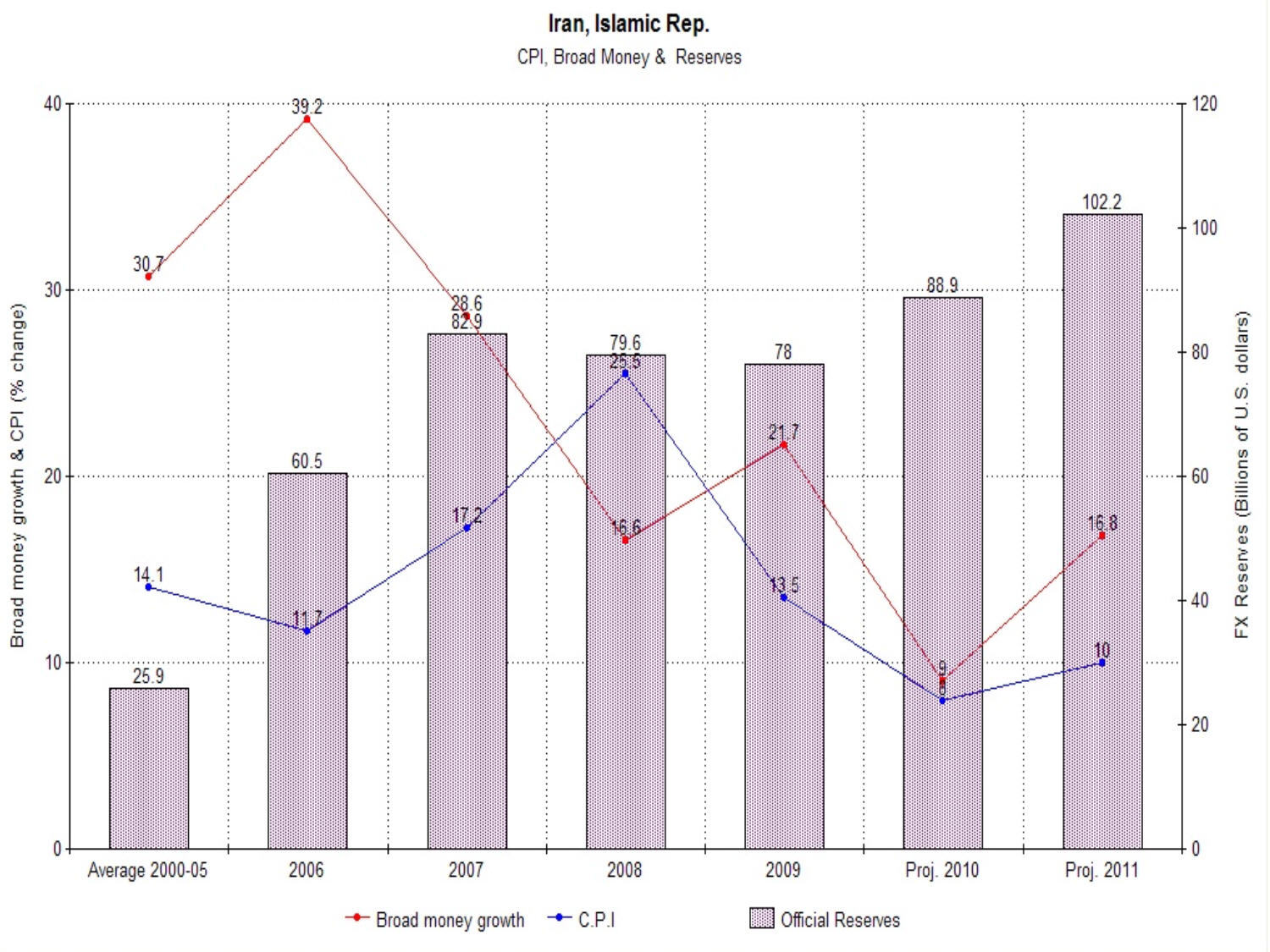
CPI, broad money and foreign exchange reserves (2000–2011)

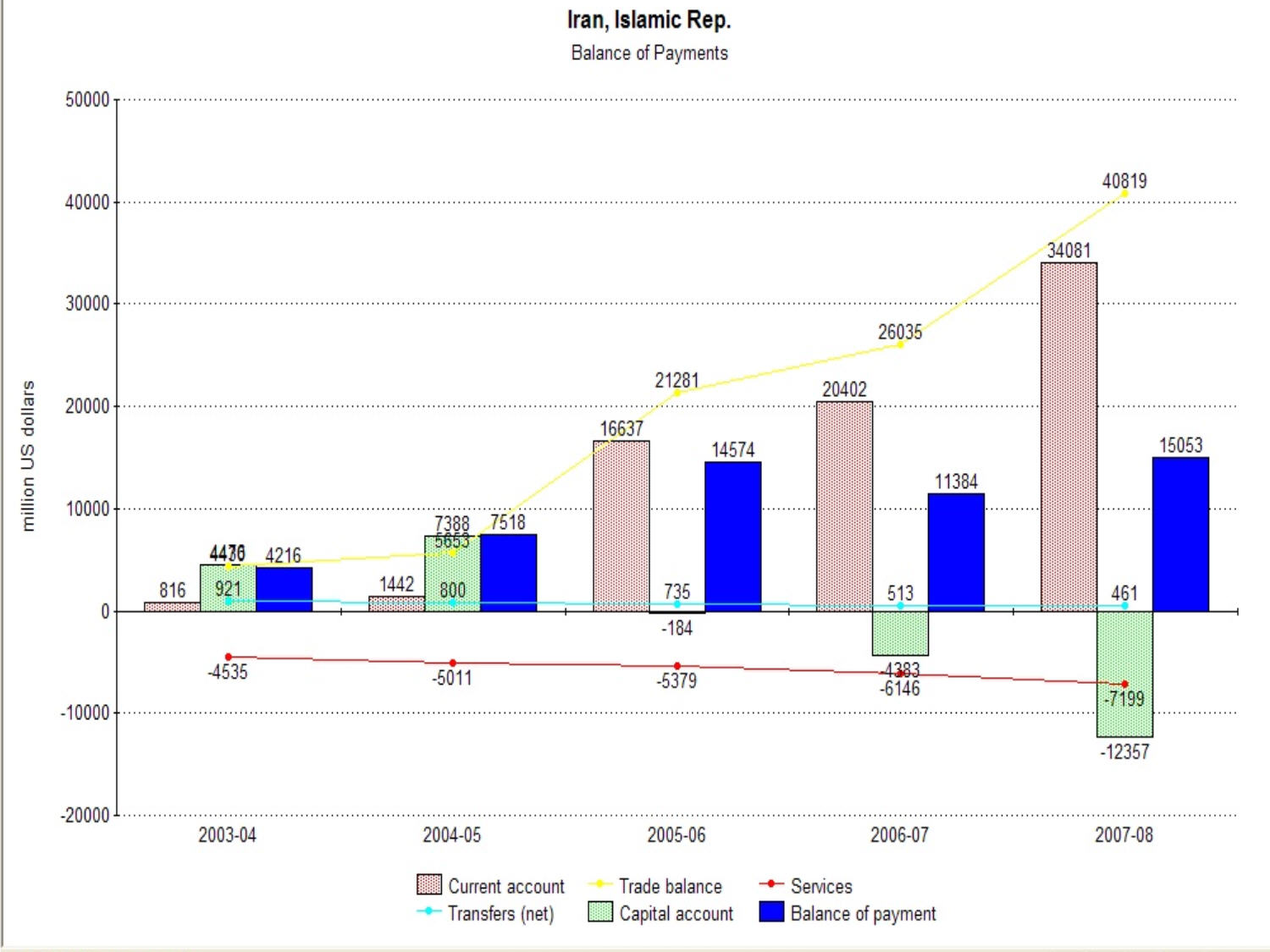
Balance of payment (2003–2007)

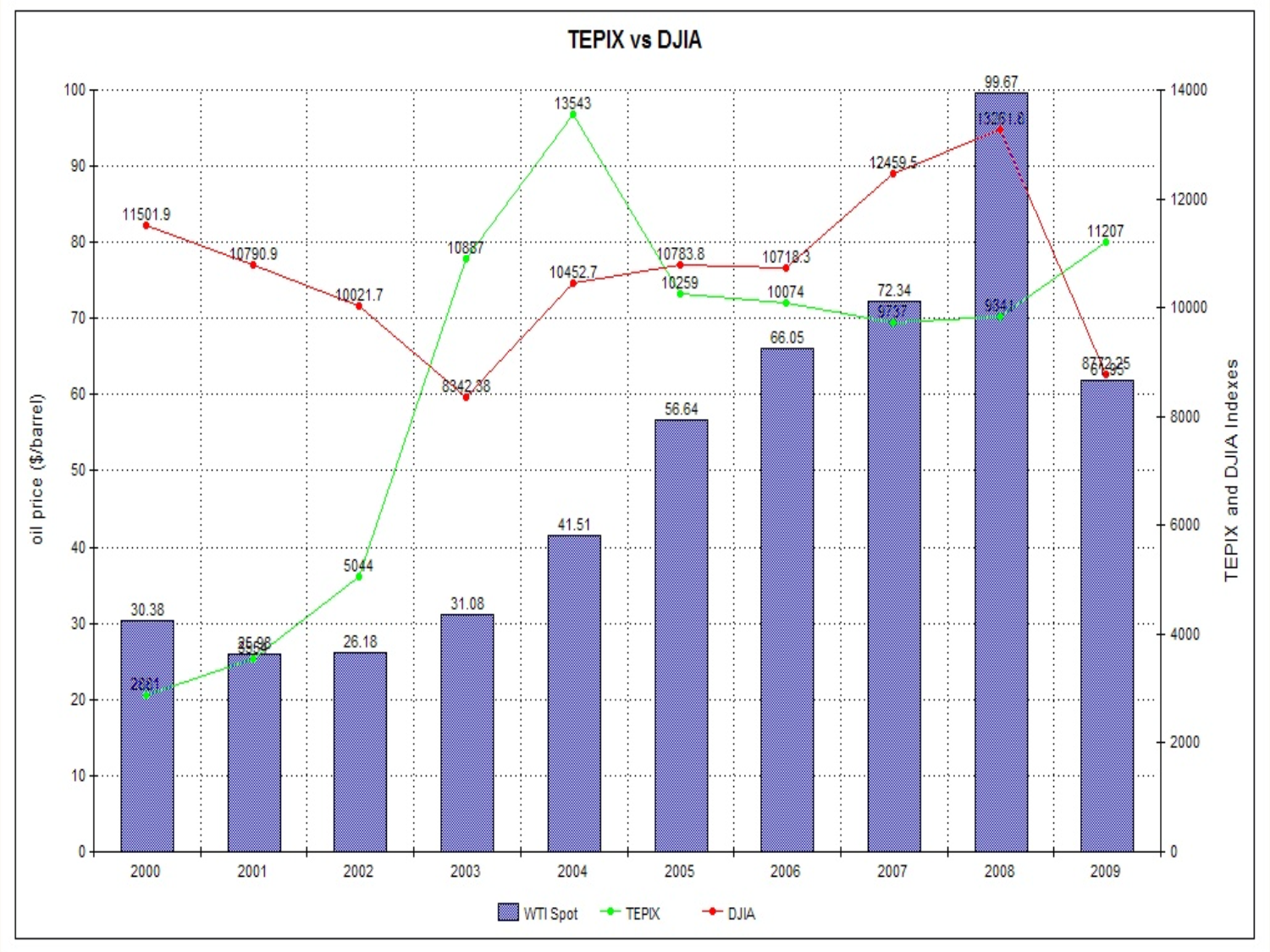
TEPIX vs DJIA and oil prices (2000–2009)

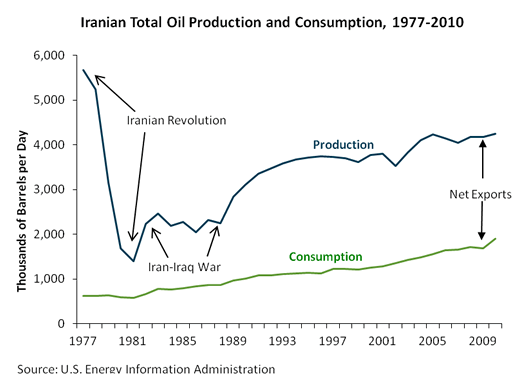
Oil production and consumption (1977–2010)

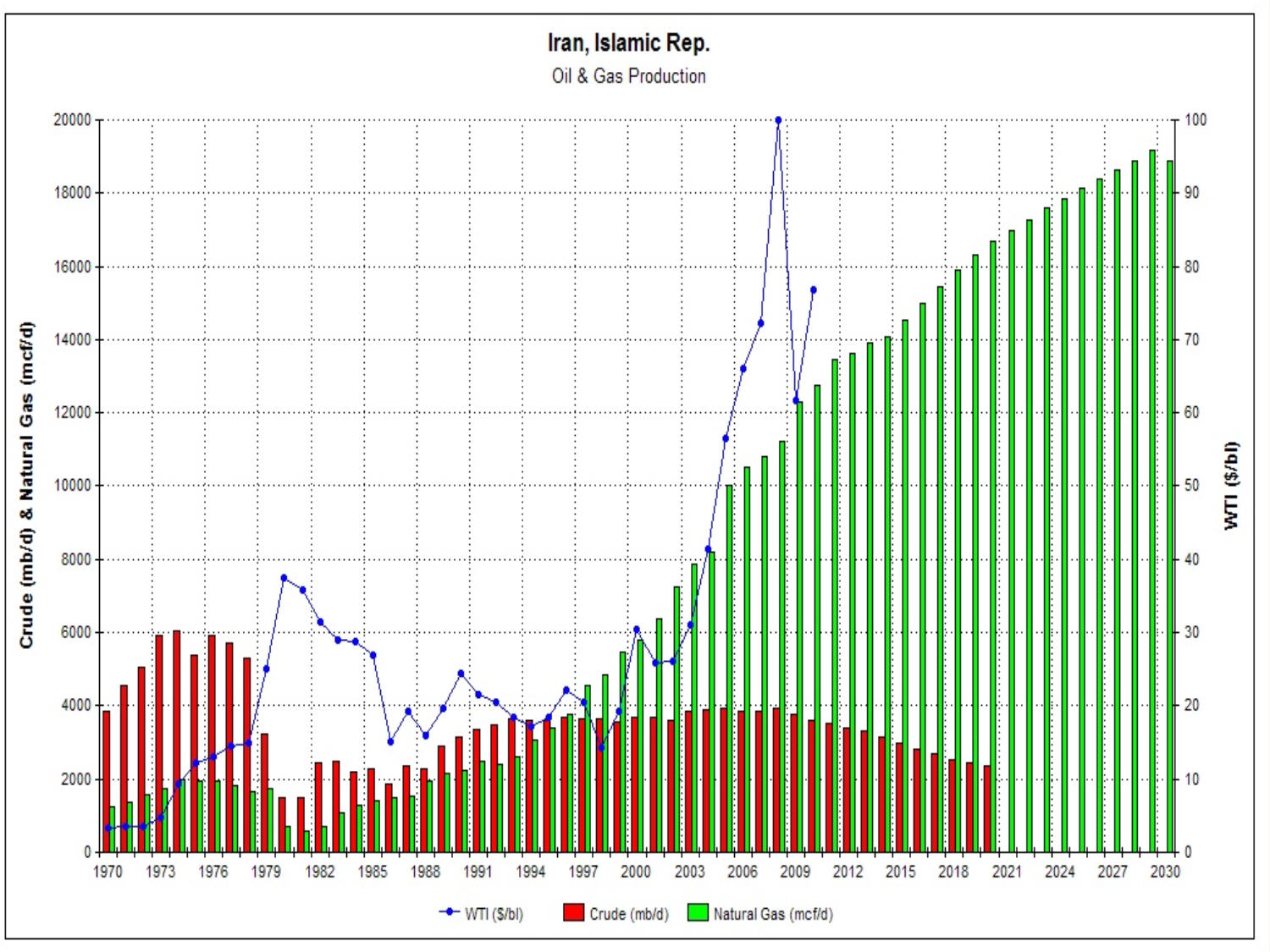
Oil and gas production (1970–2030 est.)

== See also ==
- Sasanian economy
- Economy of Iran
- Privatization in Iran
- Iranian Economic Reform Plan
- Demography of Iran
- Education in Iran
- Science and technology in Iran
- International rankings of Iran
- Trade in Iran's Safavid era

== Bibliography ==
- Suzanne, Maloney (June 2015). Iran's Political Economy since the Revolution. New York, USA: Cambridge University Press. ISBN 978-0-521-73814-9.
- Curtis, Glenn; Hooglund, Eric (April 2008). Iran, a country study. Washington, D.C., USA: Library of Congress. ISBN 978-0-8444-1187-3.
- Homa, Katouzian (1981). The Political Economy of Modern Iran: Despotism and Pseudo-Modernism, 1926–1979. London, U.K.: Macmillan Publishers. ISBN 978-1-349-04778-9.
- Amirahmadi, Hooshang (2012). The Political Economy of Iran under the Qajars: Society, Politics, Economics and Foreign Relations 1796-1926. London, UK: I.B.Tauris. ISBN 978-1-84885-672-1.
