= Apursam-Shapur =

Apursam-Shapur was an Iranian aristocrat, who is the first person mentioned as a darigbed ("palace superintendent") under the Sasanian Empire. He served as darigbed under Shapur I (r. 240–270), and is also mentioned in the latters inscription at Naqsh-e Rostam.

== Sources ==
- Frye, Richard N. (1994). "DARĪGBED". Encyclopaedia Iranica, Vol. VII, Fasc. 1. p. 40.
