= Aneran =

Ethno-linguistic term that signifies "non-Aryan"

Anērān, (Note: Middle Persian: 𐭠𐭭𐭩𐭥𐭠𐭭, romanized: Anērān, New Persian: انیران, romanized: Anērān (Note: Romanizations: Early New Persian and Classical Persian: Anērān Iranian Persian: Anirân Dari/Afghan Persian: Anērān, Anīrān Tajik: Анерон, Анирон, romanized: Aneron, Aniron)) or Nērān; (Note: New Persian: نیران, romanized: Nērān (Note: Romanizations: Early New Persian and Classical Persian: Nērān Iranian Persian: Nirân Dari/Afghan Persian: Nērān, Nīrān Tajik: Нерон, Нирон, romanized: Neron, Niron)) is an ethnolinguistic term that signifies "non-Iranian" or "non-Iran" (non-Aryan). Thus, in a general sense, 'Aniran' signifies lands where Iranian languages are not spoken. In a pejorative sense, it denotes "a political and religious enemy of Iran and Zoroastrianism." Thus, it is a cognate of both Avestan 𐬀𐬥𐬀𐬌𐬭𐬌𐬌𐬀 Ana^{i}riia (lit. 'foreign, non-Aryan') as well as Sanskrit अनार्य Anārya (lit. 'destitute of Aryans, ignoble, inferior, vulgar; someone not versed with the Vedas or its summaries (e.g., the Upanishads, Bhagavad Gita, etc.)')

The term 'Aniran' derives from Middle Persian anērān, Pahlavi ʼnyrʼn, an antonym of ērān that in turn denoted either the people or the Sasanian Empire. However, "in Zoroastrian literature and possibly in Sasanian political thought as well, the term has also a markedly religious connotation. An anēr person is not merely non-Iranian, but specifically non-Zoroastrian; and anēr designates also worshipers of the dēws ("demons") or adherents of other religions." In these texts of the ninth to twelfth century, "Arabs and Turks are called anēr, as are Muslims generally, the latter in a veiled manner."

== In inscriptions ==
In official usage, the term is first attested in inscriptions of Shapur I (r. 241–272), who styled himself the "king of kings of Ērān and Anērān." Shapur's claim to Anērān reflected the emperor's victories over Valerian and Philip, and staked a claim against the Roman Empire, the enemies of the Sassanid state. This is also reflected in Shapur I's inscription at the Ka'ba-ye Zartosht, where the emperor includes Syria, Cappadocia, and Cilicia - all three previously captured from the Romans — in his list of Anērān territories.

The proclamation as "king of kings of Ērān and Anērān" remained a stock epithet of subsequent Sassanid dynasts. Thirty years after Shapur, the Zoroastrian high-priest Kartir included the Caucasus and Armenia in his list of Anērān territories. In this, Kartir's inscription (also at Ka'ba-ye Zartosht) contradicts Shapur's, which included the same two regions in his list of regions of Ērān. James R. Russell argues that pre-Christian Armenians "probably were considered to belong to Ērān, but were Anērān after the overthrow of the Parthian Arsacids in Iran and the Christianization of Armenia.

== In scripture and folklore ==
In the ninth to twelfth century Zoroastrian texts, the legendary Turanian king and military commander Afrasiab is (together with Dahag and Alexander) the most hated among the beings that Ahriman (Avestan Angra Mainyu) set against the Iranians (Zand-i Wahman yasn 7.32; Menog-i Khrad 8.29)

In the Shahnameh, its author Ferdowsi draws on Zoroastrian scripture (with due attribution) and retains the association of Anērān with the Turanians. From the point of view of Ferdowsi's home in Khorasan, this identification coincides with the Avestan notion (e.g. Vendidad 7.2, 19.1) that the lands of Angra Mainyu (Middle Persian Ahriman) lay to the north. The two sources do however diverge with respect to details. In the Avesta, Sogdia (Avestan Sughdha, present-day Sughd and Samarqand regions) is not Anērān – Sogdia is one of the sixteen lands created by Ahura Mazda, not one of the lands of Angra Mainyu.

Nonetheless, for Ferdowsi the division between Ērān and Anērān is just as rigid as it is in the Avesta: When the primordial king Fereydun (Avestan Θraētaōna) divides his kingdom – the whole world – among his three sons, he gives the Semitic lands in the west to the eldest, the lands of the north to his middle son Tūr (Avestan Tūrya, hence the name "Tūrānian"), and Ērān to his youngest (Shahnameh 1.189). In the story, this partition leads to a family feud in which an alliance of the two elder sons (who rule over the Anērānian lands) battle the forces of the youngest (the Ērānians). The Iranians (Ērānians) win.

For Ferdowsi, the Tūrānians/Anērānians (often used interchangeably) are unquestionably the villains of the piece. Their conflict with Iranians is the main theme of the Shahnameh and accounts for more than half of the text. The deaths of heroes and other admirable figures are frequently attributed to Turanians. Thus Shahnameh 5.92 says a Turanian raider named Tur-Baratur killed the 77-year-old Zoroaster in Balkh.

== Historical analysis ==
The concept of Anērān, and the specific distinction between Iranians (Ērān) and non-Iranians (Anērān), was a core concept within the propaganda of the Sasanian Empire. The Anērān designation allowed for Sasanian kings and the nobility to adopt an ideological approach towards both its rivals and minority ethnic and religious groups, justifying their actions towards them under the label. It also helped the Sasanians gain legitimacy for their victories and expansions among Iranians. Any subjugations of the Anērān could be depicted as continuations of Iranian history and tradition.

According to historian Scott McDonough and Kaveh Farrokh, a key principle of the Sasanian Empire's monarchy was to defend the Aryan settlers and culture of the realm ("Aryan" referring to the Iranian peoples). This included the integration and protection of the Parthians and other Iranian peoples. The Sasanians extended Aryan identity to Armenians who already had strong ties to the Iranic world, notably due to their admixture with the Parthians. Anērāns were therefore any other non-Aryan/non-Iranian group within the realm.
