= Andarzbad =

Andarzbad (from Middle Persian: Andarz, "advice, counsel") was a Sasanian administrative office meaning "chief advisor", "chief councillor" or "chief of staff". The andarzbads were assigned to cities within the Sasanian Empire such as Ardashir-Khwarrah (i.e. Gor) or entire provinces, such as Sakastan. The main court andarzbad, known as the darandarzbad, served the Shahanshah ("King of Kings") directly and was one of the highest-ranking dignitaries within the Sasanian court. However, there were also andarzbads who served in other functions. There was the andarzbad ī aswāragān, who instructed the Sasanian knights, or according to Anahit Perikhanian the andarzbadī wāspuhragān, who exercised executive authority within the King's domain. The "andarzbad of the queens" (Middle Persian: bʾnykn hndrcpt; Parthian: MLKTEn hndrzpty) dates back to the reign of Shapur I (r. 240–170) and is attested in his inscription at the Ka'ba-ye Zartosht. The mōgān-andarzbad ("advisor of the magi") was a dignitary who effectively functioned as a legal consultant and held status as "one of the highest ranking dignitaries of the priestly class". M. L. Chaumont adds that the mōgān-andarzbad office "was quite different from that of the mōbadān mōbad". Andarzgar ("counselor", "teacher"), a less familiar Sasanian title, may have been modeled on andarzbad but this remains uncertain.

== Sources ==
- Asmussen, J. P. (1985). "ANDARZGAR". In Yarshater, Ehsan (ed.). Encyclopædia Iranica. Vol. II/1: Anāmaka–Anthropology. London and New York: Routledge & Kegan Paul. p. 23. ISBN 978-0-71009-101-7.
- Chaumont, M. L. (1985). "ANDARZBAD". In Yarshater, Ehsan (ed.). Encyclopædia Iranica. Vol. II/1: Anāmaka–Anthropology. London and New York: Routledge & Kegan Paul. pp. 22–23. ISBN 978-0-71009-101-7.
- Zeini, Arash; Wiesehöfer, Josef (2018). "Andarzbad". In Nicholson, Oliver (ed.). The Oxford Dictionary of Late Antiquity. Oxford: Oxford University Press. ISBN 978-0-19-866277-8.
