= Sasanian roads =

Sasanian roads were physical infrastructure important to the maintenance and development of the Sasanian Empire. Much of the Sasanian road system remains unknown due to minimal archaeological investigations. What can be deduced derives from the work of later Islamic geographers, such as Ibn Khordadbeh, who in turn relied on information provided by merchants. The main Sasanian road started from Mesopotamia. One northern route went through Hatra and Nahavand towards Khorasan, Tokharistan and Transoxania. Another northern road went to Armenia and Lazica through Adurbadagan. A southern road went through Dehloran and Susangerd towards Khuzestan before eventually reaching Pars by following a coastal road along the Persian Gulf. All roads of the Sasanian Empire were served by toll-stations, which taxed commercial goods, and services were offered to travellers as well, although the historian Khodadad Rezakhani notes that the "extent of these is not apparent archaeologically".

== See also ==
- Roman roads
- Royal Road
- Khorasan Road

== Sources ==
- Rezakhani, Khodādād (2018). "roads, Persian". In Nicholson, Oliver (ed.). The Oxford Dictionary of Late Antiquity. Oxford: Oxford University Press. ISBN 978-0-19-866277-8.
