= Khurdad (son of Hurmuzd-Afarid) =

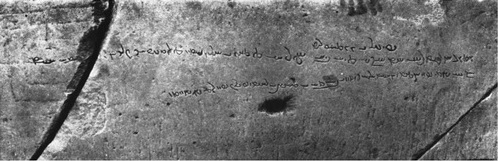
Tomb inscription of Khurdad in Constantinople

Khurdad (fl. 8th or 9th–10th centuries) was a Persian individual of modest origin who traveled from Iran to Constantinople (present-day Istanbul), the capital of the Byzantine Empire, to pursue his studies. He was the son of a man named Hurmuzd-Āfarīd. Our knowledge of Khurdad primarily comes from a grave-stone inscription found in 1964 during excavations in the Çapa district of Istanbul, conducted by Nezih Fıratlı at a Byzantine cemetery near the walls of Constantine the Great. The inscription, written in New Persian using the Pahlavi script, was deciphered through the efforts of various scholars between the 1960s and 1990s. The most widely accepted interpretation of the inscription, which remains unchallenged, was put forward by François de Blois in 1990:

‘[line 1] īn gōr xurdāδ pusar i hurmuzd-āfarīδ rā ast, ki-š xuδā bi-āmurzā, az mān i ērānšahr, az rūstā čālakān (?), az dih xišt (?),

[line 2] ki yak sāl ba ummēδ u xwāštārī-kardan i bār xuδā i masīḥ i rāst u pērōz ba rūm andar būδ’.

Translation: ‘This tomb belongs to Khurdād, son of Hurmuzd-Āfarīd, – on whom, oh Lord, mayst thou have mercy! – from the country (lit. ‘house’) of Īrānshahr, from the district of Chālakān (?), from the village of Khisht (?), who dwelt for one year in Byzantium in hope and studious desire for the Lord Christ the just and victorious’.

The inscription offers significant evidence of Persian migration to Byzantium motivated by religious factors. Khurdad, who traveled to Byzantium to pursue Christian studies, was likely fluent in both Persian and Greek, retaining his native tongue while learning the latter. He resided in Constantinople for a year before his death. While it is uncertain if he intended to stay briefly or settle permanently, the latter seems more probable. The use of the Pahlavi script indicates that Persian Christians likely preferred it over the Arabic script, given the latter’s strong Islamic associations. The sophisticated Persian language and skillful script of the inscription suggest the presence of a Persian-speaking Christian community in Constantinople, which likely commissioned the tomb for whom the Persian epitaph was intended.

The dating of Khurdad’s tomb and active period can only be speculated upon, ranging between the early eighth century and the late tenth century. If he lived during the earlier part of this period, he and his fellow Persian believers would have been contemporaries of figures like Stephen the Persian, Michael Synkellos, and the Persian monks of the Lavra of St. Sabas. Alternatively, if Khurdad lived in the late ninth or tenth century, he and his community might be linked to later waves of Persian immigration.

== Sources ==
- Shukurov, Rustam (2023). "Speaking Persian in Byzantium". Journal of Late Antique, Islamic and Byzantine Studies. 2 (1–2): 202–214. doi:10.3366/jlaibs.2023.0020.
- Shukurov, Rustam (2024). Byzantine Ideas of Persia, 650–1461. Routledge.
