= Trade in Safavid Iran =

In Safavid Iran, trade was carried out in the form of exchanging goods with goods and exchanging goods with cash (coins of Safavid or foreign silver).

Major merchants had their own agents travelling to different areas. Some merchants were doing business in distant countries such as Sweden or China. Merchants were highly valued for the government supporting them. Iran's domestic trade was in the hands of Iranian Muslim merchants.

One of the main export products was silk. Armenian, English and Dutch merchants competed in exporting raw Iranian silk. Other than silk and textiles, leather, camel and sheep wool, Chinese model dishes, gold and silver artifacts, rugs and precious stones were also exported. In return, they brought from the other side textiles, cups, mirrors and window glass, fancy metal items, luggage and writing paper.

The goods for export to Russia included: raw silk, silk textiles, polyenes, swords, arcs, arrows, pearls, saddles and a variety of paints and dried fruits. Russian merchants were operating in northern cities, as well as Isfahan and Qazvin. From Russia to Iran, they brought all kinds of fur, raw leather, mahogany, linen, printed cotton, copper, iron, Metal and glassware, paper, Fur clothing, honey, wax, sugar, fish, caviar and firearms. Exports of Iran to Turkey included tobacco, rough and silk textiles, caning Types of utensils, rugs, steel, iron, diamonds, straw and articles made of wood.

India imported from Iran horses, tobacco, all kinds of dried fruit, jam, Pickles, Flower and Fruit Extract, Types of Crocheting and chinaware. In return goods imported from India included, silk textiles, cotton fabrics, metal goods. Indian merchants worked in most Iranian cities. Many of them were money changers and usurers.

== Actions by Shah Abbas the first ==
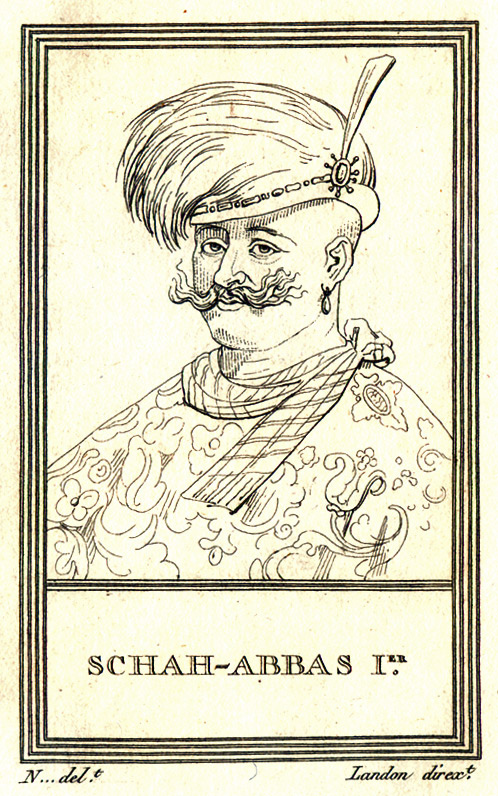
Shah Abbas the Great

Shah Abbas the Great was successful in business development. One of the important tasks of the king was to establish business relations with foreign countries. Some other goals Shah Abbas managed to achieve was the development of the ports of Hormuz and Juran (Bandar Abbas) and establishing security in these important commercial areas.

These measures led to the expansion of trade relations with foreign countries to the point where sometimes more than 300 ships in the port of Hormuz docked. Bandar Abbas and Isfahan were also major centers of activity for businessmen from India, Portugal, the Netherlands and the United Kingdom. During the Safavid period, European traders enjoyed many privileges and facilities, such as immunity from customs and customs duties. Foreign merchants were allowed to export any goods except for horses. One of the factors of business development was road security. Merchants should pay tolls and customs duties (up to 10 percent of the price of the goods). In addition, 4% was paid to "Shahbandar" in order to release the goods sooner. Of course, despite the customs of numerous houses and castles for smuggling goods, they smuggled goods.
