= Sebukht =

Sebukht was a 6th-century ambassador of the Sasanian King of Kings (shahanshah) Khosrow I (r. 531–579). Seemingly a Christian, Sebukht was sent to the Byzantine capital of Constantinople in 572 to collect the annual payment of 500 pounds of gold which was part of the terms of the Fifty-Year Peace Treaty of 562. He was, however, dismissed by emperor Justin II (r. 565–574), who sent his general Marcian against the Sasanians, thus initiating the Byzantine–Sasanian War of 572–591.

== Sources ==
- Rezakhani, Khodadad (2018). "Sebuxt". In Nicholson, Oliver (ed.). The Oxford Dictionary of Late Antiquity. Oxford: Oxford University Press. ISBN 978-0-19-866277-8.
