= Darigbed =

Darigbed was a Sasanian title equivalent to the Byzantine title kouropalates ("palace superintendent"). The title is first mentioned in the inscription of Shapur II (r. 240–270) at Naqsh-e Rostam.

== List of prominent holders ==
- Apursam-Shapur, Iranian aristocrat, who served as darigbed under Shapur I (r. 240–270).
- Bozorgmehr, aristocrat from the House of Karen, who served as darigbed under Khosrow I (r. 531–579).
- Bahram Chobin, aristocrat from the House of Mihran, who served as darigbed under Hormizd IV (r. 579–590).
- Rostam Farrokhzad, aristocrat from the House of Ispahbudhan, who served as darigbed under Khosrow II (r. 590–628).
- Farrukhzad, aristocrat from the House of Ispahbudhan, who served as darigbed under Khosrow II (r. 590–628).

== Sources ==
- Pourshariati, Parvaneh (2008), Decline and Fall of the Sasanian Empire: The Sasanian-Parthian Confederacy and the Arab Conquest of Iran, London and New York: I.B. Tauris, ISBN 978-1-84511-645-3
- Daryaee, Touraj (2009). Sasanian Persia: The Rise and Fall of an Empire. I.B.Tauris. pp. 1–240. ISBN 978-0857716668.
- Frye, Richard N. (1994). "DARĪGBED". Encyclopaedia Iranica, Vol. VII, Fasc. 1. p. 40.
