= Amargar =

Amargar (Middle Persian: āmārgar) was a Sasanian administrative office which corresponded to a type of tax collector or chief fiscal officer. The amargar could administer several towns, or even a province, such as Kirman or Pars. The Eran-amargar was in charge of the financial affairs of the whole empire.

== Sources ==
- MacKenzie, D. N.; Chaumont, M. L. (1989). "Āmārgar". Encyclopaedia Iranica, Vol. I, Fasc. 9. pp. 925–926.
- Miri, Negin (2013). "Sasanian Administration and Sealing Practices". In Potts, Daniel T. (ed.). The Oxford Handbook of Ancient Iran. Oxford University Press. ISBN 978-0199733309.
