= Iran (word) =

Historical overview and definition of "Iran" and its usage

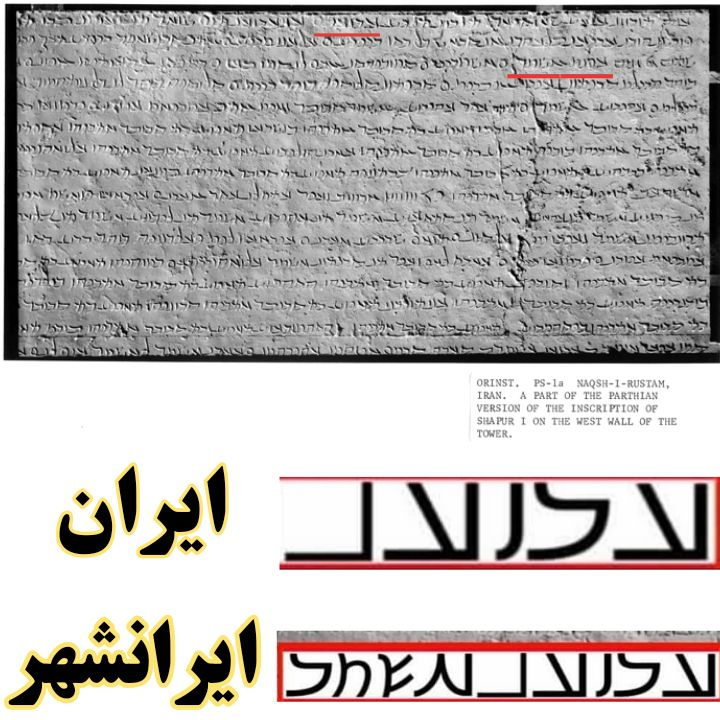
Shapur I's inscription at the Ka'ba-ye Zartosht (c. AD 262), with Ērānšahr and Ērān highlighted.

In Modern Persian, the word Ērān/Īrān (ایران) derives immediately from 3rd-century Middle Persian Ērān (𐭠𐭩𐭥𐭠𐭭), initially meaning "of the Aryans" before acquiring a geographical connotation as a reference to the lands inhabited by the Aryans. In both the geographic and demonymic senses, Ērān is distinguished from the antonymic Anērān, literally meaning "non-Iran" (i.e., non-Aryan).

In the geographic sense, Ērān was also distinguished from Ērānšahr, which was the preferred endonym of the Sasanian Empire, notwithstanding the fact that it included lands that were not primarily inhabited by the various Iranic peoples.

The term Iranian appears in ancient texts with diverse variations. This includes Arioi (Herodotus), Arianē (Eratosthenes apud Strabo), áreion (Eudemus of Rhodes apud Damascius), Arianoi (Diodorus Siculus) in Greek and Ari in Armenian; those, in turn, come from the Iranian forms: ariya in Old Persian, airya in Avestan, ariao in Bactrian, ary in Parthian and ēr in Middle Persian.

== In pre-Islamic usage ==
The word ērān is first attested in the inscriptions that accompany the investiture relief of Ardashir I (r. 224–242) at Naqsh-e Rustam. In this bilingual inscription, the king calls himself "Ardashir, king of kings of the Aryans" (Middle Persian: ardašēr šāhān šāh ī ērān; Parthian: ardašēr šāhān šāh ī aryān). The Middle Iranian ērān/aryān are oblique plural forms of gentilic ēr- (Middle Persian) and ary- (Parthian), which in turn both derive from Old Iranian *arya-, meaning "'Aryan,' i.e., 'of the Iranians.'" This Old Iranian *arya- is attested as an ethnic designator in Achaemenid inscriptions as Old Persian ariya-, and in Zoroastrianism's Avesta tradition as Avestan airiia-/airya, etc. (Note: In the Avesta the airiia- are members of the ethnic group of the Avesta-reciters themselves, in contradistinction to the anairiia-, the "non-Iranians", e.g. in Yasht 18's airiianəm xᵛarənah, the divine "Iranian glory" granted by Ahura Mazda to vanquish the demonic daevas and other un-Iranian creatures. The word also appears four times in Old Persian: One is in the Behistun inscription, where ariya- is the name of a language or script (DB 4.89). Additionally, the Elamite version corresponding DB IV 60 and 62 identifies Ahura Mazda as god of the Iranians. The other three instances of Old Persian ariya- occur in Darius I's inscription at Naqsh-e Rustam (DNa 14-15), in Darius I's inscription at Susa (DSe 13-14), and in the inscription of Xerxes I at Persepolis (XPh 12-13). In these, the two Achaemenid dynasts both describe themselves as pārsa pārsahyā puça ariya ariyaciça "a Persian, son of a Persian, an Iranian, of Iranian origin." "The phrase with ciça, 'origin, descendance,' assures that it [i.e. ariya] is an ethnic name wider in meaning than pārsa and not a simple adjectival epithet." "There can be no doubt about the ethnic value of Old Iran. arya." "All [the] evidence shows that the name arya "Iranian" was a collective definition, denoting peoples [...] who were aware of belonging to the one ethnic stock, speaking a common language, and having a religious tradition that centered on the cult of Ahura Mazdā.") It is "very likely" that Ardashir I's use of Middle Iranian ērān/aryān still retained the same meaning as did in Old Iranian, i.e. denoting the genitive case of the ethnonym rather than a proper toponym.

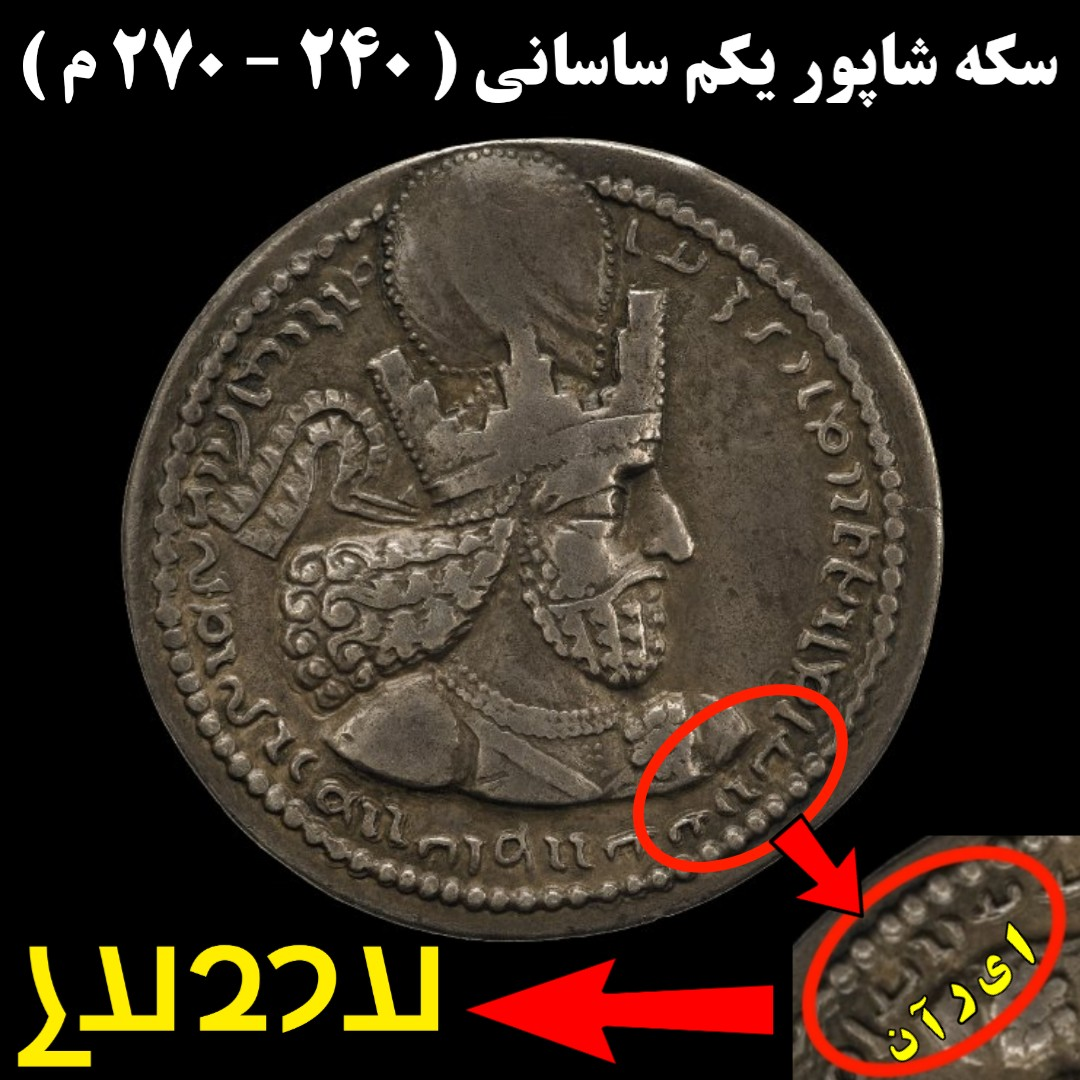
The form of the word Ērān (𐭠𐭩𐭥𐭠𐭭) in Inscriptional Pahlavi on a coin of the second Sasanian King of Kings Shapur I.

The expression "king of kings of the Aryans" found in Ardashir's inscription remained a stock epithet of all the Sasanian kings. Similarly, the inscription "the Mazda-worshipping (mazdēsn) lord Ardashir, king of kings of the Iranians" that appears on Ardashir's coins was likewise adopted by Ardashir's successors. Ardashir's son and immediate successor, Shapur I (r. 240/42–270/72) extended the title to "King of Kings of Iranians and non-Iranians" (Middle Persian: MLKAn MLKA 'yr'n W 'nyr'n šāhān šāh ī ērān ud anērān; Parthian: MLKYN MLKA ’ry’n W ’ny’ry’n šāhēn šāh ī Aryān ud Anaryān; Ancient Greek: βασιλεὺς βασιλέων Ἀριανῶν καὶ Ἀναριανῶν basileús basiléōn Arianōn kaì Anarianôn), thus extending his intent to rule non-Iranians as well, or because large areas of the empire was inhabited by non-Iranians. In his trilingual inscription at the Ka'ba-ye Zartosht, Shapur I also introduces the term *Ērānšahr. (Note: The Middle Persian version of this inscription has not survived, but is reconstructable from the Parthian version, in which *Ērānšahr appears as Parthian Aryānxšahr.) Shapur's inscription includes a list of provinces in his empire, and these include regions in the Caucasus that were not inhabited predominantly by Iranians. An antonymic anērānšahr is attested from thirty years later in the inscriptions of Kartir, a high priest under several Sasanian kings. Kartir's inscription also includes a lists of provinces, but unlike Shapur's considers the provinces in the Caucasus anērānšahr. These two uses may be contrasted with ērānšahr as understood by the late Sasanian Šahrestānīhā ī Ērānšahr, which is a description of various provincial capitals of the ērānšahr, and includes Africa and Arabia as well.

Notwithstanding this inscriptional use of ērān to refer to the Iranian peoples, the use of ērān to refer to the empire (and the antonymic anērān to refer to the Roman territories) is also attested by the early Sasanian period. Both ērān and anērān appear in 3rd century calendrical text written by Mani. The same short form reappears in the names of the towns founded by Sasanian dynasts, for instance in Ērān-xwarrah-šābuhr "Glory of Ērān (of) Shapur". It also appears in the titles of government officers, such as in Ērān-āmārgar "Accountant-General of Ērān", Ērān-dibirbad "Chief Scribe of Ērān", and Ērān-spāhbad "Spahbed of Ērān".

Because an equivalent of ērānšahr does not appear in Old Iranian (where it would have been *aryānām xšaθra- or in Old Persian *- xšaça-, "rule, reign, sovereignty"), the term is presumed to have been a Sasanian-era development. In the Greek portion of Shapur's trilingual inscription the word šahr "kingdom" appears as ethnous (genitive of "ethnos") "nation". For speakers of Greek, the idea of an Iranian ethnos was not new: The mid-5th-century BCE Herodotus (7.62) mentions that the Medes once called themselves Arioi. The 1st century BCE Strabo cites the 3rd-century BCE Eratosthenes for having noted a relationship between the various Iranian peoples and their languages: "[From] beyond the Indus [...] Ariana is extended so as to include some part of Persia, Media, and the north of Bactria and Sogdiana; for these nations speak nearly the same language." (Geography, 15.2.1-15.2.8). Damascius (Dubitationes et solutiones in Platonis Parmenidem, 125ff) quotes the mid-4th-century BCE Eudemus of Rhodes for "the Magi and all those of Iranian (áreion) lineage". The 1st-century BCE Diodorus Siculus (1.94.2) describes Zoroaster as one of the Arianoi.

== In early Islamic times ==
The terms ērān/ērānšahr had no currency for the Arabic-speaking Caliphs, for whom Arabic al-'ajam and al-furs ("Persia") to refer to Western Iran (i.e. the territory initially captured by the Arabs and approximately corresponding to the present-day country of Iran) had greater traction than indigenous Iranian usage. Moreover, for the Arabs ērān/ērānšahr were tainted by their association with the vanquished Sasanians, for whom being Iranian was also synonymous with being mazdayasna, i.e. Zoroastrian. Accordingly, while the Arabs were generally quite open to Iranian ideas if it suited them, this did not extend to the nationalistic and religious connotations in ērān/ērānšahr, nor to the concomitant contempt of non-Iranians, which by the Islamic era also included Arabs and "Turks".

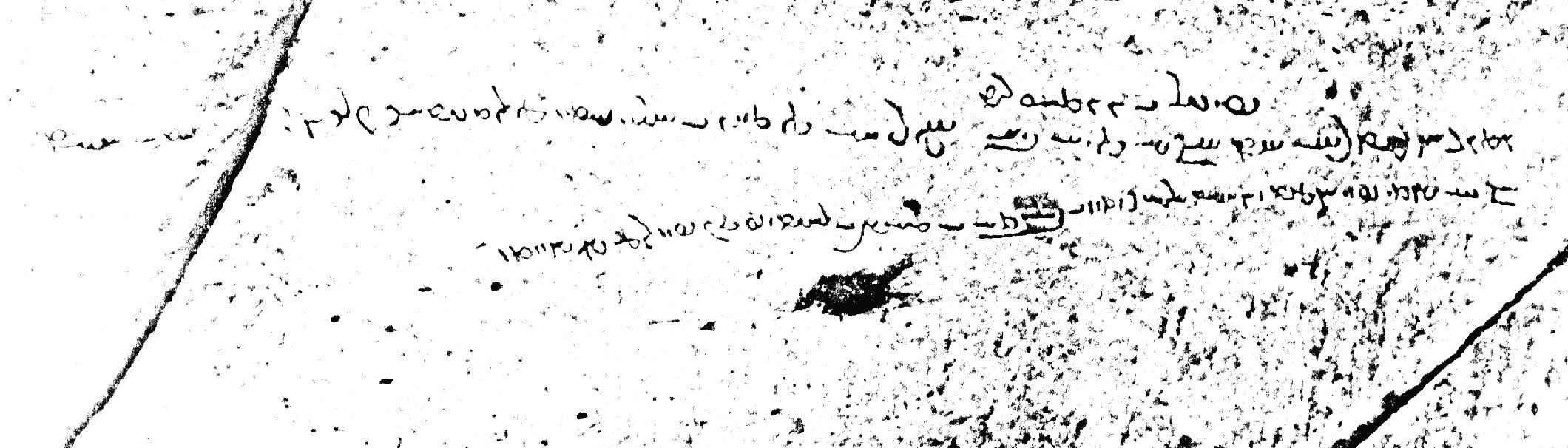
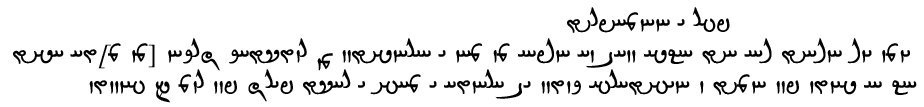
An inscription in Middle Persian on the tombstone of a Christian from Anatolia in the 9th century AD:

Ēn gōr Hurdād [pusar ī Ohrmazdāfrīd] rāy ast, kū-š xwadāy bē āmurzād. Az mān ī Ērānšahr, az rōdestāg Zargān, az deh Xišt

This grave is the grave of Khurdad (Xurdād), the son of Hurmazd-Āfarīd, may Khuda (Xudā, lit. 'God') bless him. From the land of Ērānšahr, from the region Zarqan (Zargān), from the village Khesht (Xišt).

The rise of the Abbasid Caliphate in the mid-8th century ended the Umayyad policy of Arab supremacy and initiated a revival of Iranian identity. This was encouraged by the transfer of the capital from Syria to Iraq, which had been a capital province in Sasanian, Arsacid and Archaemenid times and was thus perceived to carry an Iranian cultural legacy. Moreover, in several Iranian provinces, the downfall of the Umayyads was accompanied by a rise of de facto autonomous Iranian dynasties in the 9th and 10th centuries: the Tahirids, Saffarids and Samanids in eastern Iran, Afghanistan and Central Asia, and the Ziyarids, Kakuyids and Buyids in central, northern, southern and western Iran. Each of these dynasties identified themselves as "Iranian", manifested in their invented genealogies, which described them as descendants of pre-Islamic kings, and legends as well as the use of the title of shahanshah by the Buyid rulers. These dynasties provided the "men of the pen" (ahl-i qalam), i.e. the literary elite, with an opportunity to revive the idea of Iran.

The best known of this literary elite was Ferdowsi, whose Shahnameh, completed around 1000 CE, is partly based on Sasanian and earlier oral and literary tradition. In Ferdowsi's take on the legends, the first man and first king created by Ahura Mazda are the foundations of Iran. At the same time, Iran is portrayed to be under threat from Aniranian peoples, who are driven by envy, fear and other evil demons (dews) of Ahriman to conspire against Iran and its peoples. "Many of the myths surrounding these events, as they appear [in the Shahnameh], were of Sasanid origin, during whose reign political and religious authority become fused and the comprehensive idea of Iran was constructed."

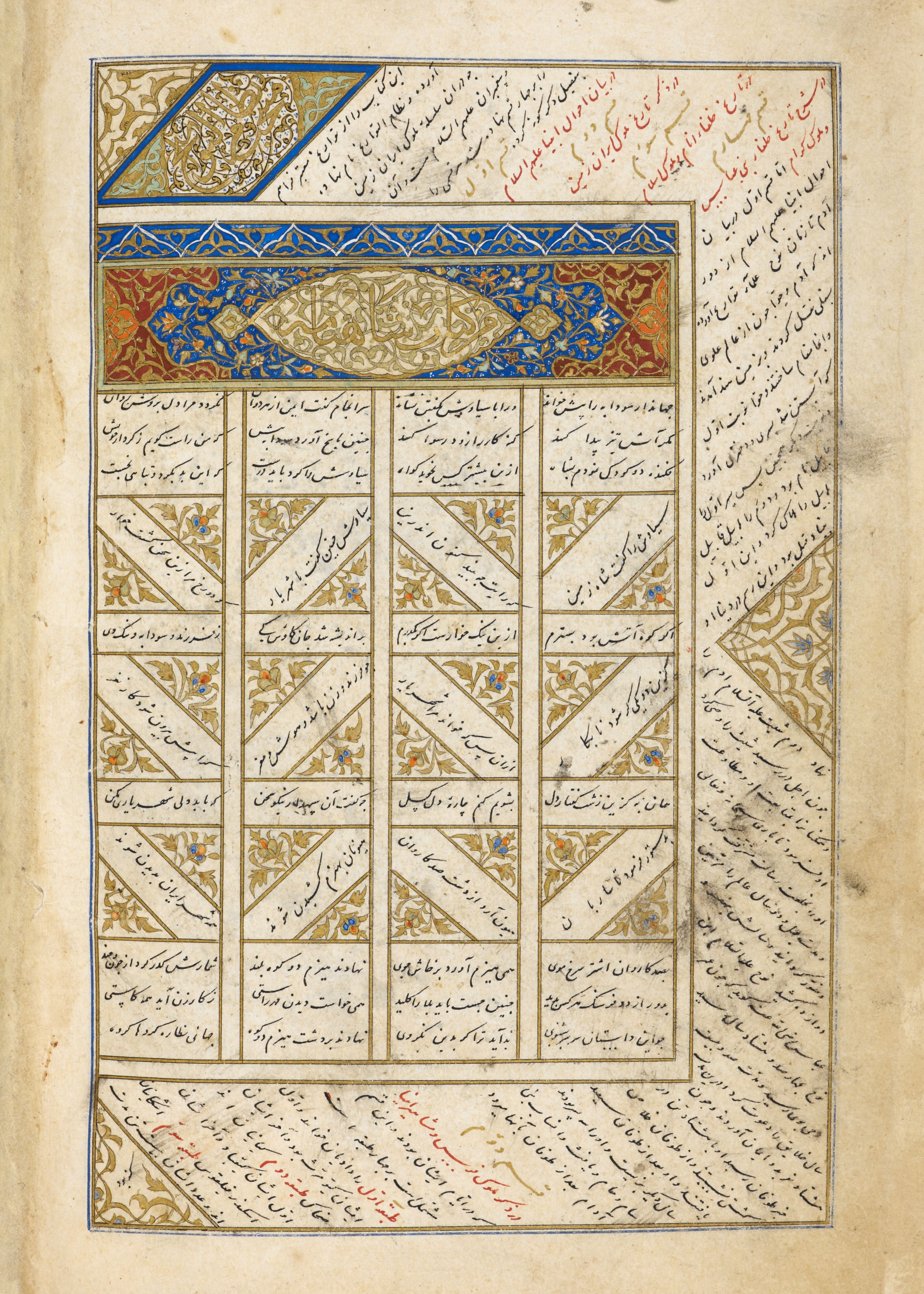
The terms Ērān-zamīn (“Land of Iran”) and Shahr-i Ērān (“Realm of Iran”), on a folio from an anthology prepared for the Timurid prince, Iskandar.

In time, Iranian usage of ērān began to coincide with the dimensions of Arabic al-Furs, such as in the Tarikh-i Sistan which divides Ērānšahr into four parts and restricts ērān to only Western Iran, but this was not yet common practice in the early Islamic-era. At that early stage, ērān was still mostly the more general "(lands inhabited by) Iranians" in Iranian usage, occasionally also in the early Sasanian sense in which ērān referred to people, rather than to the state. Notable among these is Farrukhi Sistani, a contemporary of Ferdowsi, who also contrasts ērān with tūrān, but—unlike Ferdowsi—in the sense of "land of the Turanians". The early Sasanian sense is also occasionally found in medieval works by Zoroastrians, who continued to use Middle Persian even for new compositions. The Denkard, a 9th-century work of Zoroastrian tradition, uses ērān to designate Iranians and anērān to designate non-Iranians. The Denkard also uses the phrases ēr dih, plural ērān dihān, to designate lands inhabited by Iranians. The Kar-Namag-i Ardasher-i Pabagan, a 9th-century hagiographic collection of legends related to Ardasher I uses ērān exclusively in connection with titles, i.e. šāh-ī ērān and ērān-spāhbad (12.16, 15.9), but otherwise calls the country Ērānšahr (3.11, 19; 15.22, etc.). A single instance in the Book of Arda Wiraz (1.4), also preserves the gentilic in ērān dahibad distinct from the geographic Ērānšahr. However, these post-Sasanian instances where ērān referred to people rather than to the state, are rare, and by the early Islamic period the "general designation for the land of the Iranians was [...] by then ērān (also ērān-zamīn, šahr-i ērān), and ērānī for its inhabitants." That "Ērān was also generally understood geographically is shown by the formation of the adjective ērānag "Iranian," which is first attested in the Bundahishn and contemporary works."

In the Zoroastrian literature of the medieval period, but apparently also perceived by adherents of other faiths, Iranianness remained synonymous with Zoroastrianism. In these texts, other religions are not seen as "un-Zoroastrian", but as un-Iranian. This is a major theme in the Ayadgar-i Zareran 47, where ērīh "Iranianess" is contrasted with an-ērīh, and ēr-mēnišnīh "Iranian virtue" is contrasted with an-ēr-mēnišnīh. The Dadestan-i Denig (Dd. 40.1-2) goes further, and recommends death for an Iranian who accepts a non-Iranian religion (dād ī an-ēr-īh). Moreover, these medieval texts elevate the Avesta's mythical Airyanem Vaejah (Middle Persian & New Persian: ērān-wēj) to the center of the world (Dd. 20.2), and give it a cosmogonical role, either (PRDd. 46.13) where for all plant life is created, or (GBd. 1a.12) where animal life is created. Elsewhere (WZ 21), it is imagined to be the place where Zoroaster was enlightened. In Denkard III.312, humans are imagined to have first all lived there, until ordered to disperse by Vahman und Sros. This ties in with an explanation given to a Christian by Aturfarnbag-i Farruxzatan when asked why Ohrmazd only sent his religion to Ērānšahr. Not all texts treat Iranianness and Zoroastrianism as synonymous. Denkard III.140, for instance, simply considers Zoroastrians to be the better Iranians.

The existence of a cultural concept of "Iranian-ness" (New Persian: Ērāniyat) is also demonstrated in the trial of Afshin in 840, as recorded by Tabari. Afshin, the hereditary ruler of Osrushana, on the southern bank of the middle stretch of the Syr Darya, had been charged with propagating Iranian ethnonational sentiment. Khaydhar ibn Kawus al-Afshin acknowledged the existence of a national consciousness (al-aʿjamiyya) and his sympathies for it. "This episode clearly reveals not only the presence of a distinct awareness of Iranian cultural identity and the people who actively propagated it, but also of the existence of a concept (alaʿjamiya or Ērāniyat) to convey it."

== Modern usage ==
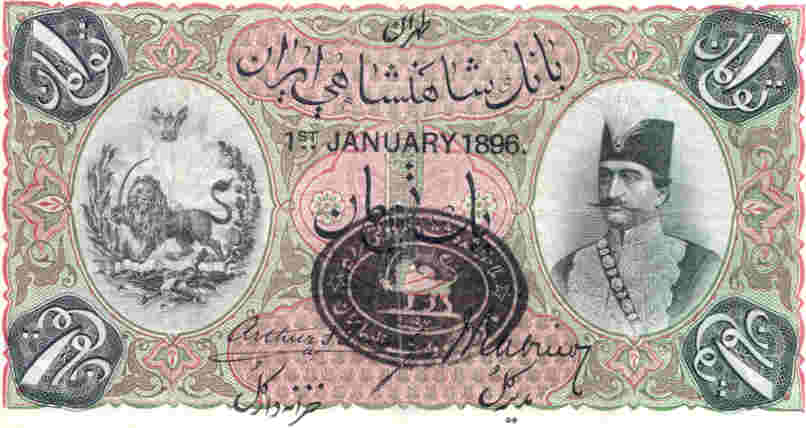
Qajar-era currency bill featuring a depiction of Naser al-Din Shah Qajar. It states: Issued from the Imperial Bank of Persia

During the Safavid era (1501–1736), most of the territory of the Sasanian Empire regained its political unity, and Safavid monarchs were assuming the title of "Šāhānšāh-i Ērān" (Iran's king of kings). The Safavids revitalized the concept of the Guarded Domains of Iran, which starting from them would serve as the common and official name of Iran until the early 20th century. An example is Mofid Bafqi (d. 1679), who makes numerous references to Iran, describing its border and the nostalgia of Iranians who had migrated to India in that era. Even Ottoman sultans, when addressing the Aq Qoyunlu and Safavid shahs, used such titles as the "king of Iranian lands" or the "sultan of the lands of Iran" or "the king of kings of Iran, the lord of the Persians". This title, as well as the title of "Šāh-i Ērān", was later used by Nader Shah Afshar and Qajar and Pahlavi monarchs. Since 1935, the name "Iran" has replaced other names of Iran in the western world. Jean Chardin, who travelled in the region between 1673 and 1677, observed that "the Persians, in naming their country, make use of one word, which they indifferently pronounce Iroun, and Iran. [...] These names of Iran and Touran, are frequently to be met with in the ancient histories of Persia; [...] and even to this very day, the king of Persia is called Padeshah e Iran [padeshah = 'king'], and the great vizier, Iran Medary [i.e., medari = 'facilitator'], the Pole of Persia".

Since the Iranian revolution of 1979, the official name of the country is "Islamic Republic of Iran".

== Sources ==
- Amanat, Abbas (1997). Pivot of the Universe: Nasir Al-Din Shah Qajar and the Iranian Monarchy, 1831–1896. I.B. Tauris. ISBN 978-1845118280.
- Amanat, Abbas (2017). Iran: A Modern History. Yale University Press. ISBN 978-0300112542.
