= Sasanian economy =

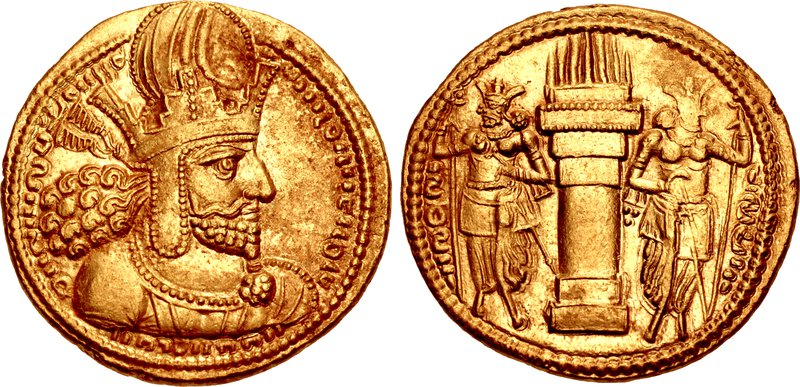
Dinar of Shapur I

The Iranian society in the Sasanian era was an Agrarian society and due to this fact, the Sasanian economy relied on farming and agriculture.

The main exports of the Sasanians were silk; woolen and golden textiles; carpets and rugs; hides; and leather and pearls from the Persian Gulf. There were also goods in transit from China (paper, silk) and India (spices), which Sasanian customs imposed taxes upon, and which were re-exported from the Empire to Europe.

Due to special geographical situation of the Iranian world, the Sasanians were able to control the sea routes and due to this, they were one of the most important players in the international trade in the late antiquity.

== Local trade ==
We know that in the early Sasanian period, the empire showed a great interest in establishing ports on the coast of the Persian Gulf. In the Karnamag of Ardashir Papagan (Book of Deeds of Ardashir son of Papak), one of these ports is mentioned, and it is called "Bōxt-Artaxšīr", which is modern-day Bushehr. This port was important for the Sasanians because it linked Kazerun to center of Persis, modern-day Shiraz. There were other ports on the Iranian side of the Persian Gulf in the Sassanid period, like Sirāf, Hormuz, Kujaran Artaxšīr, etc. According to Ammianus Marcellinus “all along the coast [of the Persian Gulf] is a throng of cities and villages, and many ships sail to and from.”

== International trade ==
=== Rivalry with the Roman Empire ===
We know that in the sixth century, the Sasanians were not only bent on controlling the Arabian sea and of course, their own home waters, the Persian Gulf, but also looked further east. This brought the Persians into conflict with Rome. Silk was important in the ancient world and was something that the Romans wanted. With the seas under Iranian control, the Romans had to seek the aid of the Ethiopians. However, this plan failed and probably caused the Aksumite–Persian wars, which made Yemen an Iranian vassal at the end of the wars.

Procopius states that Justinian sent an embassy to Axum, and requested the Ethiopians "that they should buy silk from the Indians, and sell it to the Romans. thus they would make a lot of money, while they would only be bringing this gain to the Romans, that they [the Romans] would no longer be forced to send their own money to their enemies [the Persians.]" However, the plan didn't succeed, "for it was impossible for the Ethiopians to buy silk from the Indians, because the Persian merchants present at the very ports [of Ceylon in Sri Lanka] where the first ships of the Indians put in, since they inhabit a neighboring country, were always accustomed to buy the entire cargoes." However, it is not believed that being neighbors was the reason behind cooperation of Iranian and Sinhalese merchants, and the better reason would be that the Iranians were long-established customers and they didn't want to offend the Sasanians by doing business with the rivals of the Persian Empire. However, silk problem of the Romans was solved by the introduction of silkworms to the Roman Empire.

=== Trade with Sri Lanka ===
Sasanian conquest of Sri Lanka under Khosrow I boasted by later sources of Tabari, Hamza and Tha'alibi, rather seems to be an exaggeration and unlikely to be true, as it is neither supported by Byzantine nor eastern sources. The Byzantine historian Procopius confirms that the Sasanian merchants engaged in particularly assertive commercial practices in India, where they purchased entire cargoes from arriving vessels, thereby depriving their competitors of access to these goods. The "conquest" claimed by the Muslim historians may indeed reflect the substantial commercial influence exerted by Sasanian merchants on the island (Ceylon).

=== Trade with China ===
We also have information about the Sasanian trade with China. Iranian-Chinese trade was conducted through two ways, through the Silk Road and the sea routes. Many Sasanian coins were found on the coasts of China.

== Bazaars ==
The main economic activity in the cities was performed by the merchants (Middle Persian: wʾčʾlkʾn' wāzāragān) and took place in the bazaars (wʾčʾl wāzār). In the Sasanian-era bazaars, each group of artisans had its own specific section, called rāste in Persian. We know this information from the Denkard, which talks about the rules that existed "about the series of shops in the bazaar belonging to various artisans." (VIII, Chapter 38) The Denkard also mentions a list of professions who occupied a section of the bazaar, like the blacksmiths (Middle Persian: āhengar) and barbers (Middle Persian: wars-wirāy).

For each artisan guild (kirrog), there was a head of the guild (kirrogbed) and the activity and the prices of the bazaar were overlooked by the head of the bazaar (Middle Persian: Middle Persian: 𐭥𐭠𐭰𐭠𐭫𐭯𐭲 wʾcʾlpt wāzārbed, Parthian: Parthian: 𐭅𐭀𐭔𐭓𐭐𐭕𐭉 wʾšrpty wāžārbed; mentioned in the Res Gestae Divi Saporis).

== Merchants ==
While there were Sasanian merchants as far as China, the Zoroastrian view on them is not very good. The Mēnōg of Khrad (Spirit of Wisdom), one of the most important Zoroastrian books, talks about the merchants very negatively.

The function of the workers is this: that they would not engage in a work with which they are not familiar and do well and with precision what they know, and receive a fair wage.

— Mēnōg of Khrad, Question 32

== Iranian colonies in South and East Asia ==
We also know about establishments of Sasanian colony and ports as far as East Asia. There were a Sasanian colony in Malaysia which was composed of merchants. Since Persian horses were shipped to Ceylon, a Sasanian colony was established at that island, where the ships came from Iran to its port. To expand their trade, the Sasanians built more ports, in the places like Muscat and Sohar. We even know about Sasanian colonies at Kilwa on the east coast of Africa.

Establishment of Iranian colonies in China has also been confirmed, by the existence of Zoroastrian fire-temples, found in the Chang’an region in southern China.

== Income ==
A comparative study of the economy of Sasanian Empire relative to those of the Abbasid Caliphate, Byzantine Empire, and Han Empire suggests the Sasanian government after the reforms of Khosrow I had 3 to 6 times higher income, although the government was levying less taxes relative to later non-Iranian governments of Persia.

== See also ==
- Sasanian coinage
- Economy of Iran
- Roman economy
- Byzantine economy
