= Sasanian family tree =

Iranian imperial family from 224 to 651

This is a family tree of the Sasanian emperors, their ancestors, and Sasanian princes/princesses.

== History ==
The Sasanian dynasty was named after Sasan, the eponymous ancestor of the dynasty. It was founded by Ardashir I in 224, who defeated the last Parthian (Arsacid) king, Artabanus IV (Persian: اردوان Ardavan) and ended when the last Sasanian monarch, Yazdegerd III (632–651), lost a 19-year struggle to drive out the early Arab Caliphate, which was the first of the Islamic empires.

It is believed that the following dynasties and noble families have ancestors among the Sasanian rulers:

- The Dabuyid dynasty (642–760), descendants of Jamasp.
- The Paduspanids (665–1598) of Mazandaran, descendants of Jamasp.
- The Shahs of Shirwan (1100–1382), from Hormizd IV's line.
- The Banu Munajjim (9th–10th century), from Mihr Gushnasp, a Sasanian prince.
- The Kamkarian family (9th–10th century), a dehqan family descended from Yazdegerd III.
- The Mikalids (9th–11th century), a family descended from the Sogdian ruler Divashtich, who was, in turn, a descendant of Bahram V Gur.

== Sasanian family tree ==
The solid lines indicate parent-to-child lineage and the dotted lines indicate questionable blood relationships.

Weh-afrid
Sasan	Rambehesht	Gochihr
Papak	Rodag
Shapur	Ardashir I (224–242)	Balash	Denag
Narseh	Shapur I (240–270)	Ardashir Kirmanshah	Ardashir Marvshah	Peroz I Kushanshah	Narseh	Mihrshah Meshanshah	Ardashir Nodshiraganshah
Hormizd I (270–271)	Bahram I (271–274)	Narseh (293–302)	Shapur Meshanshah	Adur-Anahid
Hormozdak	Bahram II (274–293)	Hormizd II (302–309)	Hormizddukhtak	Hormizd	Hormizdag	Odabakht	Bahram	Shapur	Peroz	Shapurdukhtak
Bahram III (293)	Adur Narseh (309)	Hormizd	Ardashir II (379–383)	Shapur II (309–379)	Adurfrazgird	Zamasp	Asay	Hormizddukht	Shapur Sakanshah
Zruanduxt	Shapur III (383–388)	Peroz-Gushnasp
Bahram IV (389–399)	Yazdegerd I (399–420)
Khosrow (420)	Shapur IV (420)	Bahram V (420–438)	Narseh
Yazdegerd II (438–457)	□	Aswagen
Hormizd III (457–459)	Peroz I (457–484)	Balash (484–488)	Zarir († 485)	Vache II
Balendukht
Kavadh I (488–496, 498–531)	Jamasp (496–498)	Perozdukht
Kawus	Jamasp	Xerxes	Khosrow I (531–579)	Narsi	Niwandukht
Shapur	Kavadh	Piruz
Gil Gavbara
Vinduyih	Vistahm (590/1–596 or 594/5–600)	□	Hormizd IV (579–590)	Anoshazad	Yazdandad
Hormizd V (630–631)	Khosrow II (590–628)	Kavadh	{{{unk}}}	Shahrbaraz (630)	Bahram VI (590-591)	Chahardukht	Mah-Adhur Gushnasp
Rostam Farrokhzad	Farrukhzad	Khosrow III (630)	Shapur V (630)	Peroz II (630)	Khosrow IV (631)
Kavadh II (628)	Azarmidokht (630–631)	Mardanshah († 628)	Javanshir	Arwandrang († 628)	Guranshah († 628)	Afrudshah († 628)	Khurrah († 628)	Pusdil († 628)
Boran (629–630, 631–632)	Farrukhzad Khosrow V (631)	Shahriyar († 628)	□
Ardashir III (628–629)	Yazdegerd III (632–651)	Hormizd VI (630–631)
Peroz III (651–677)	Bahram VII	Izdundad	Mihr Gushnasp
Narsieh (677–???)	Khosrow VI

== See also ==
- List of shahanshahs of the Sasanian Empire
- Bavandid family tree

== Notes ==
a: The exact relation between Sasan and Papak is unclear.
b: Ancestor of the Dabuyids and Paduspanids.
c: Member of the same family as Bahram VI.
d: Ancestor of the Samanids through his son Noshrad.
e: Founder of the Bavand dynasty.
f: Alleged ancestor of the Banu Munajjim.
