= Spahan (province) =

Province of the Sasanian Empire

Spāhān
- Province of the Sasanian Empire
- 224–642
- Map of Spahan
- Capital: Spahan
- Historical era: Antiquity
  - Established: 224
  - Annexed by the Rashidun Caliphate: 642
Preceded by	Succeeded by
Parthian Empire	Rashidun Caliphate
- Today part of: Iran

Spahan, also known as Parthau, was a Sasanian province in Late Antiquity, that lay within central Iran, almost corresponding to the present-day Isfahan province in Iran.

== Etymology ==
Spahān is attested in various Middle Persian seals and inscriptions, including that of Zoroastrian priest Kartir. The present-day name (Isfahan) is the Arabicized form of Ispahan (unlike Middle Persian, New Persian does not allow initial consonant clusters such as sp). The region appears with the abbreviation GD (Gay, Southern Media) on Sasanian numismatics. In Ptolemy's Geographia it appears as Aspadana, translating to "place of gathering for the army". It is believed that Spahān derives from spādānām 'the armies', Old Persian plural of spāda (from which derives spāh 'army' in Middle Persian). The province is called Parthau on Shapur I's inscription at the Ka'ba-ye Zartosht.

== History ==
Spahan became a part of the Sasanian Empire in 224, after Ardashir I (r. r. 224–242) seized its capital and killed its ruler, Shadh-Shapur. During the reign of Ardashir's son and successor Shapur I (r. 240–270), a certain Varzin was appointed as the governor of the province.

In 642, the battle of Spahan took place, where it was fought between the Rashidun Arabs and the Sasanians. The Arabs were victorious during the battle, where they reportedly killed the prominent Mihran commander Shahrvaraz Jadhuyih. After the battle, the Arabs made peace with Fadhusfan, the governor of the city. According to an Arab historian, many civilians were killed or enslaved after the battle.

== Sources ==
- Hansman, J. (2006). "ISFAHAN iv. PRE-ISLAMIC PERIOD". Encyclopaedia Iranica, Vol. XIII, Fasc. 6. pp. 635–638.
- Pourshariati, Parvaneh (2008). Decline and Fall of the Sasanian Empire: The Sasanian-Parthian Confederacy and the Arab Conquest of Iran. London and New York: I.B. Tauris. ISBN 978-1-84511-645-3.
- Frye, Richard Nelson (1984). The History of Ancient Iran. C.H.Beck. pp. 1–411. ISBN 9783406093975.
- Brunner, Christopher (1983). "Geographical and Administrative divisions: Settlements and Economy". The Cambridge History of Iran: The Seleucid, Parthian, and Sasanian periods (2). Cambridge: Cambridge University Press. pp. 747–778. ISBN 978-0-521-24693-4.
