= Battle of Spahan =

642 battle

- Part of Islamic conquest of Persia
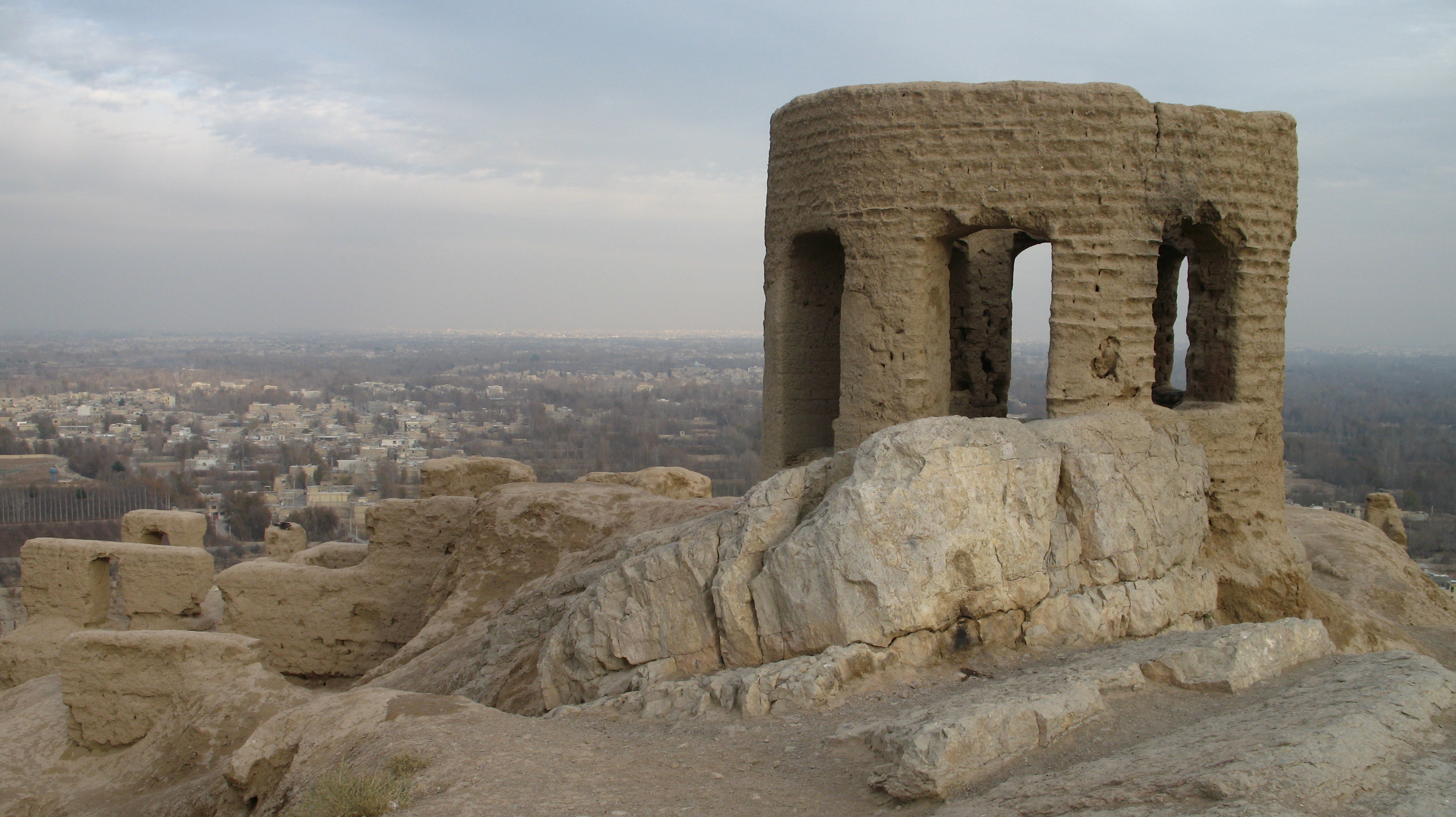
- Picture of one of the few remaining Zoroastrian temples in Isfahan
Date	642
Location	Spahan (now Isfahan), Spahan province
Result	Muslim victory

Belligerents
Rashidun Caliphate	Sasanian Empire

Commanders and leaders
Abdallah ibn Abdallah ibn Itbah	Shahrvaraz Jadhuyih †; Padhuspan

Strength
Unknown	Unknown

Casualties and losses
Unknown	Unknown

The Battle of Spahan was fought between the Rashidun Caliphate and the Sasanian Empire in 642. The Arabs were victorious during the battle, where they reportedly killed the Mihran commander Shahrvaraz Jadhuyih. After the battle, the Arabs made peace with Fadhusfan, the governor of the city. According to Abu No'aym, many people were killed or enslaved after the conquest and the settlement pattern of the region changed. Isfahan capitulated by 644 after a few failed revolts and treaties for paying taxes and tributes in exchange for military protection were drawn up.

== Sources ==
- Pourshariati, Parvaneh (2008). Decline and Fall of the Sasanian Empire: The Sasanian-Parthian Confederacy and the Arab Conquest of Iran. London and New York: I.B. Tauris. ISBN 978-1-84511-645-3.
