= Sasanian dynasty =

Founding house of the Sasanian Empire (224–651)

Sassanid ساسانی Sassanid dynasty
- Royal house
- Derafsh Kaviani banner of the late Sassanid Empire
- Parent family: Family of Sasan
- Country: Sasanian Empire
- Etymology: House of Sasan
- Origin: Persis Iran
- Founded: 224 CE
- Founder: Ardashir I
- Current head: None; dynasty dissolved
- Final ruler: Narsieh
- Titles: King of Kings (Note: Šāhān-šāh); King of Kings of Aryans and non-Aryans (Note: Šāhān-šāh ī Ērān ud Anērān); Great King (Note: Šāh ī Vazurg); Mazda-worshipper Lord (Note: Mazdēsn Bay); From the race of the Gods (Note: cihr az yazdān); Shah; Padishah; Kay
- Traditions: Zorastrianism
- Cadet branches: Dabuyid dynasty Mikalid dynasty Banu Munajjim; Bavand Dynasty

The Sasanian dynasty, also known as the Sassanids or the House of Sasan, was the last pre-Islamic Persiandynasty to establish hegemony over much of Western Asia. Founded by Ardashir I in 224 CE, in Pars, the dynasty ruled Ērānšahr until its fall in 651 CE. Ardashir named the dynasty in honor of his ancestor Sasan, from whom the ruling family claimed descent. The empire is also described by scholars as the “Second Persian Empire” or the “Neo-Persian Empire.”

During its rule, the Sasanian Empire emerged as one of the leading powers of Late Antiquity and played a pivotal role in the political and cultural history of Iran and the Near East.

The Shahanshah served as the sole sovereign, head of state, and head of government of the empire, although at times effective power passed to other officials, most notably the spahbed. After the Muslim conquest of Persia by the Rashidun Caliphate in 651 and the death of Yazdegerd III, members of the imperial sassanid family fled in exile, and sought refuge in China, where they were accepted as members of the imperial court by the Emperor Gaozong of Tang. Several attempts were made, with Tang support, to restore Sasanian rule in Iran. The exiled branch of the dynasty remained in China. Narsieh, a grandson of Yazdegerd III and the last recorded member of the Sasanian royal house in China, adopted the surname Li (李) in honor of the Tang imperial family. He is also regarded as the last notable ruler or member of the Sasanian dynasty.

== Origins ==
=== Modern Scholars View ===
The name "Sasanians" is derived from a Persian priest named Sasan, the ancestor of the dynasty. One of his sons was Pâpak, who revolted against the lawful ruler of Iran, Artabanus IV, at the beginning of the third century. The Sasanians were based in Firuzabad and Istakhr, not far from ancient Persepolis. Both cities are in Persis, modern Fars.

Dara II, the last Kayanian king to rule before Alexander, is partly based on the last Achaemenid King of Kings, Darius III (r. 336–330 BC), whose empire was conquered by Alexander's forces. A son of Dara II named Sasan (called "the elder") fled to India and lived there in exile until his death. He was survived by a son who was likewise named Sasan (called "the younger"), "which continued in the family for four generations". A descendant of the family, likewise named Sasan, worked for Pabag, who was a local ruler in Pars. Pabag's daughter married Sasan and bore him a son named Ardashir. Following this, Sasan is no longer mentioned. The Shahnameh thus indicates that the ancestors of Sasan resided in India following Alexander's conquests. This report has been used by scholars to point out Sasan's Indo-Parthian connection. The historian Marek Jan Olbrycht has suggested that the family was descended from the Indo-Parthians of Sakastan. Due to resemblance of the coinage of Farn-Sasan the last Indo-Parthian monarch and the Sasanian Ardashir I, including the shared name Sasan—a name popular in the Indo-Parthian realm—suggests that the Sasanians and Indo-Parthians possibly shared a common ancestry. Iranologist Khodadad Rezakhani also noted similarities between the early Sasanians and the Indo-Parthians, such as their coinage. Yet, he stated that "evidence might still be too inconclusive."

=== Sasanian claims ===
The Sasanian monarchs claimed descent from the Kayanids, a legendary Iranian dynasty mentioned in the Avesta, the sacred texts of Zoroastrianism, which is commonly thought to be based upon the late Achaemenid dynasty. As such, Dara II, the Kayanid king Sasan supposedly traced his lineage to, was most likely based upon Darius III, whose empire was conquered by Alexander the Great just like Dara's. Another differing account exists in Kar-Namag i Ardashir i Pabagan, in which Ardashir is presented as the son of Sasan, a descendant of Darius III, and a daughter of Pabag, a feudal ruler in Persis, whose name is not mentioned. However, these conflicting accounts led some historians, like Touraj Daryaee, to believe that Ardashir simply claimed descent from anyone who was most convenient for him. Relating Ardashir to the legendary Kayanians with the nickname Kay, besides connecting himself to Sasan, a guardian deity, and also to Dara, which is possibly a combination of Darius I and Darius III the Achaemenid, hints at a possible attempt to claim lineage from the Achaemenids. The Sasanians claimed such lineage for prestige and legitimacy of their rule.

=== Sasan deity ===
The name "Sasan" was thought to be composed of the epigraphic form "Ssn" on wares and other documents, implying that Sasan was based on a Zoroastrian deity, though he is not mentioned in the Avesta or any other Iranian texts. The historian Martin Schwartz has recently shown that the deity shown on the pottery wares is not related to Sasan, but shows Ssn, an old Semitic goddess that was worshiped in Ugarit in the second millennium BC. The word "Sasa" is written on coins found in Taxila; it is probably related to "Sasan", since the symbols on the coins are similar to the coins of Shapur I, son of Ardashir. With all this in mind, it can be assumed that Ardashir claimed his lineage to be divine and the Sasanians may have raised Sasan's rank to that of a god's.

== See also ==
- List of monarchs of the Sasanian Empire
- Sasanian family tree
- Sasanian architecture

== Sources ==
- Pourshariati, Parvaneh (2008). Decline and Fall of the Sasanian Empire: The Sasanian-Parthian Confederacy and the Arab Conquest of Iran. London and New York: I.B. Tauris. ISBN 978-1-84511-645-3.
- Shahbazi, A. Shapur (2005). "SASANIAN DYNASTY". Encyclopaedia Iranica, Online Edition.
- Zanous, Hamidreza Pasha; Sangari, Esmaeil (2018). "The Last Sasanians in Chinese Literary Sources: Recently Identified Statue Head of a Sasanian Prince at the Qianling Mausoleum". Iranian Studies. 51 (4): 499–515. doi:10.1080/00210862.2018.1440966. S2CID 165568529.
- Olbrycht, Marek Jan (2016). "Dynastic Connections in the Arsacid Empire and the Origins of the House of Sāsān". In Curtis, Vesta Sarkhosh; Pendleton, Elizabeth J.; Alram, Michael; Daryaee, Touraj (eds.). The Parthian and Early Sasanian Empires: Adaptation and Expansion. Oxbow Books. ISBN 9781785702082.
- Rezakhani, Khodadad (2017). ReOrienting the Sasanians: East Iran in Late Antiquity. Edinburgh University Press. pp. 1–256. ISBN 9781474400305.
