= Rambehesht =

Rambehesht (Middle Persian: Rām Vahišt, New Persian: رام‌بهشت), also known as Denag (Middle Persian: Dēnag, New Persian: دینگ) was a 3rd-century Sasanian noblewoman from the Bazrangi family and the wife of Sasan, the eponymous ancestor of the Sasanian Dynasty (ruled 224-651) in Persia. She was the mother of Pabag and the grandmother of Ardashir I, the founder of the Sasanian Empire. According to Tabari she "possessed beauty and perfection".

== Sources ==
- Gignoux, Philippe (1994). "Dēnag". In Yarshater, Ehsan (ed.). Encyclopædia Iranica. Vol. VII/3: Dehqān I–Deylam, John of. London and New York: Routledge & Kegan Paul. p. 282. ISBN 978-1-56859-021-9.
- Tabari (1999), "The Sāsānids, the Byzantines, the Lakhmids, and Yemen", Tarikh-e Tabari, vol. 5, translated by C. E. Bosworth (SUNY series in Near Eastern studies ed.), SUNY Press, p. 458, ISBN 0-7914-4355-8
- Frye, R. N. (1990), "BĀZRANGĪ", Encyclopaedia Iranica, vol. 4, New York, London
