= Abu Ahmad Monajjem =

Persian music theorist

Abu Ahmad Yahya ibn Ali ibn Yahya ibn Abi Mansur Aban al-Monajjem
- Born: 241/855-56
- Died: 13 Rabi' I 300/29 October 912
- Occupations: Music theorist, literary historian, poet
- Notable work: Resāla fi’l-mūsīqī (Treatise on music), Ketāb al-bāher fī aḵbār šoʿarāʾ moḵażramī al-dawlatayn

Abu Ahmad Yahya ibn Ali ibn Yahya ibn Abi Mansur Aban al-Monajjem (Arabic: ابواحمد یحیی ابن علی ابن یحیی ابن ابی منصور آبان المنجم; 241/855-56 – in 13 Rabi' I 300/29 October 912) was a medieval Persian music theorist, literary historian and poet. He belonged to the family of Banu Munajjem, a family of Iranian descent, associated with the Abbasid court for more than two centuries. His father 'Alī ibn Yaḥyā al-Munajjim (died 888) was a student of the renowned musician Ishaq al-Mawsili.

He is mainly famous for a treatise on music, Resāla fi’l-mūsīqī رساله فی الموسیقی written for Al-Mu'tadid. His other famous work, of equal importance, is a compilation of biographies with some poetry named Ketāb al-bāher fī aḵbār šoʿarāʾ moḵażramī al-dawlatayn. He was highly praised by Al-Marzubani as a decent poet. He was well-versed in Arabic language, and he it is said that he wrote many books, though even the name of those books are not known today.
