= Satarop =

Iranian king

Satarop was an Iranian king who ruled Parthia. He was possibly first a vassal of the Kushan Empire, and by the time the Sasanian ruler Ardashir I had begun to conquer Iran, he acknowledged the latter's authority. Nothing more is known about him.

== Sources ==
- Frye, Richard Nelson (1984). The History of Ancient Iran. C.H.Beck. pp. 1–411. ISBN 9783406093975. "The history of ancient iran."
