= Kar-Namag-i Ardasher-i Pabagan =

Short Middle Persian prose tale

The Kār-Nāmag-ī Ardašēr-ī Pāpagān (Book of the Deeds of Ardashir, Son of Papag) is a short Middle Persian prose tale written in the Sasanian period (226–651). It tells the story of Ardashir I, the founder of the Sasanian dynasty, including his rise to the throne, battle against the Parthian king Artabanus IV, and conquest of the Parthian Empire. It also contains sections about his successor Shapur and the latter’s son, Hormizd.

According to the Kar-Namag, after Ardashir was born to Sasan and the daughter of Pabag, he spent his childhood in the court of Artabanus IV of Parthia and then ran away with a maidservant of the king. After several wars with Artabanus, Ardashir I defeated and killed the king, after which he founded the new empire. The Kar-Namag is permeated with Zoroastrian doctrine.

== Manuscripts ==
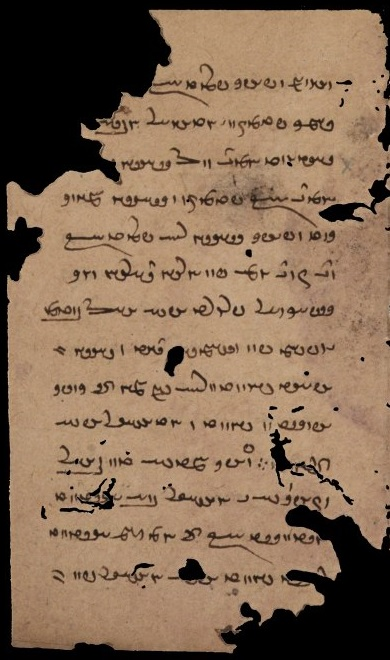
Page from the codex MK

The sole independent manuscript of this text to have been identified so far is codex MK, which was copied in 1322 in Gujarat by Mihrabān-ī Kay-Khusraw, a gifted copyist belonging to a well-known family of scribes. The book narrates the epic adventures of Ardashir I, the founder of the Sasanian Empire. The story relates how Ardashir's father Pābag, dreamed that his father Sasan would be reborn as Ardashir. According to the story, Ardashir I was the natural son of Sassan. A recension of the same story is found in the Shahnameh. However, the text draws on more ancient Persian mythology, as some traits of Ardashir’s life as narrated in this work reflect themes found in the legend of Cyrus the Great.

Mary Boyce, a British scholar of Iranian languages, comments,

This is a short prose work, simple in style, probably written in Pars towards the end of the Sasanian period. It, too, was evidently the work of priests, and a comparison with Ferdowsi's rendering shows how effectively Zoroastrian elements were obliterated in the Muslim redaction. The Kârnâmag contains some historical details; but its generally romantic character has been explained as due to contamination with legends of Cyrus the Great, still current then in Pars.

== Plot ==
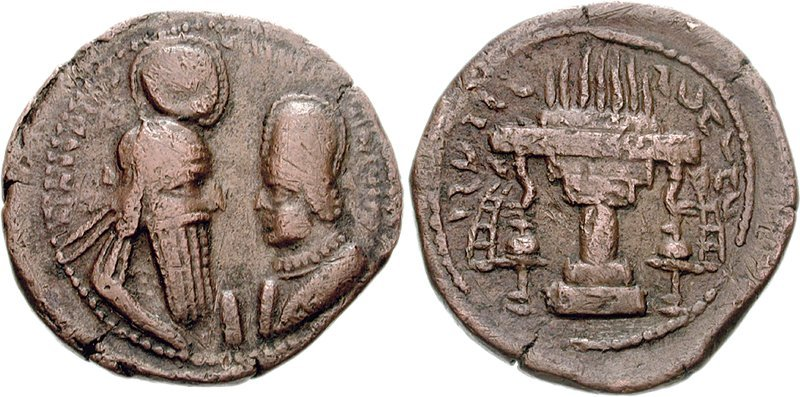
Coin of Ardashir I (r. 224–242) and Shapur I (r. 240-270).

The story starts with the birth of Ardashir to Pābag's daughter and Sasan, a descendant of the Kayanian dynasty. He leaves his home to be educated by Ardawan, but after an argument with Ardawan's son he is demoted to overseer of the stables. After some time, a favourite maid of the Parthian king Ardavan fell in love with Ardashir and informed him of a prophecy that had been announced to the sovereign by the chief astrologer about Ardashir's future greatness. The maid escaped Ardawan's domain and together with Ardashir, they escaped on two horses stolen from his stables along with a sizeable quantity of treasure, weapons, and armour. Ardawan and his troops follow the trail of the maiden and Ardashir. During this pursuit, Ardawan questions passers-by, who tell them that they had seen the couple on the run, followed by a large ram. The king interrogates his dastur about the meaning of this scene, and the sage answers that the ram represents the farnah, the divine glory that confers kingship, which had not yet joined with Ardashir. In Persian mythology, once a king possesses the farnah, he is invincible. During the second day of pursuit, Ardawan is told that the ram sat on the back of Ardashir’s horse. The dastur then advises him to stop his pursuit, since Ardashir now possesses the divine xwarrah. The story follows with the description of Ardashir's triumph over Ardawan in the battle of Hormuzagān. Then follows his campaign against a group of nomads and then his victory against Haftobād, a giant worm, through a stratagem suggested by the pious brothers Burzag and Burz-Ādur. He defeats Haftobād by pouring molten copper down the creature's throat.

The last part of the story relates to the son of Ardashir, Shapur I, and the life of the son of the latter, Ohrmazd. Ardashir’s wife, the daughter of Ardawan, instigated by her brothers, made an attempt on the king’s life. The plot fails, and Ardashīr sentences her to death, but the wise and compassionate mobed (priest) spares her life so that she may give birth. Shapur was raised in the mobed's household. Ardashir had no knowledge of the priest sparing the life of his son. According to the Shahnameh, the holy man castrates himself in order to be beyond all suspicion. Years later, the mobed tells Ardashir that he saved Shapur I and consequently is rewarded by Ardashir. An Indian astrologer foretells that Iran will be strong only if Ardashir's family unites with that of his mortal enemy, Mihrag. Ardashir, however, had fought the family of Mihrag and exterminated them. However, a girl from the family of Mihrag survives and marries Shapur. Thus, the son of Shapur, Ohrmazd, is born, and he unites the entire Eranshahr under his command and receives tribute and homage from the other kings of the time.

== Analysis ==
Scholars have noted that the story is deprived of any historicity because the story is a legend. Evidence mounted in this direction includes the legend's narrative that Ardeshir did not have any siblings, when in reality he had at least one known brother. The Kar-Namag was created with the purpose of providing the rising Sasanian dynasty, in its early stages as the Sasanian Empire, a glorified past equal to have of the Achaemenids while also linking the Sasanian to the Achaemenids. The story was a propaganda piece aimed at giving legitimacy to the Sasanians. However, elements of the story are historically accurate, namely the depiction of the Battle of Hormozdgan where Ardashir and his son Shapur I (later to be Shahanshah as Shapur I) won the battle and overtook Iran under their dynasty. The even older conquest of Media by Cyrus the Great is hinted at in the story.

== Translations ==
The story has been translated to numerous languages. The oldest English translation was translated by Darab Dastur Peshotan Sanjana, B.A., 1896.

== See also ==
- Middle Persian literature
