= Yahya ibn Abi Mansur =

Iranian astronomer

- یحیی ابن ابی منصور
- Died: 830; Aleppo

Academic work
- Era: Islamic Golden Age
- Main interests: Astronomy, astrology

Yahya ibn Abi Mansur (Arabic: یحیی ابن ابی منصور), also called Bizist, son of Firuzan (Persian: بزیست فیروزان; d. 830) was a senior Persian official from the Banu al-Munajjim family, who served as an astronomer and an astrologer at the court of Abbasid caliph al-Ma'mun. Since his father Abu Mansur Aban was an astrologer in service of caliph al-Mansur, it can be concluded that Yahya spent his childhood in Baghdad.

Yahya ibn Abi Mansur's first known position was as an astrologer for al-Fadl ibn Sahl, vizier of the caliph al-Ma'mun. After the assassination of al-Fadl, Yahya converted to Islam and adopted his Arabic name. He is associated with the House of Wisdom, and is mentioned as a teacher of the Banu Musa. He died near Aleppo in 830.

== Sources ==
- Van Dalen, Benno (2007). "Yaḥyā ibn Abī Manṣūr: Abū ʿAlī Yaḥyā ibn Abī Manṣūr al‐Munajjim". In Hockey, Thomas; et al. (eds.). Biographical Encyclopedia of Astronomers. Springer. pp. 1249–1250. doi:10.1007/978-0-387-30400-7_1433. ISBN 978-1-4419-9918-4. (PDF version)
