= Ardashir I =

Founder and Shahanshah of the Sasanian Empire from 180 to 242

Ardashir I 𐭠𐭥𐭲𐭧𐭱𐭲𐭥
- King of Kings of Iranians
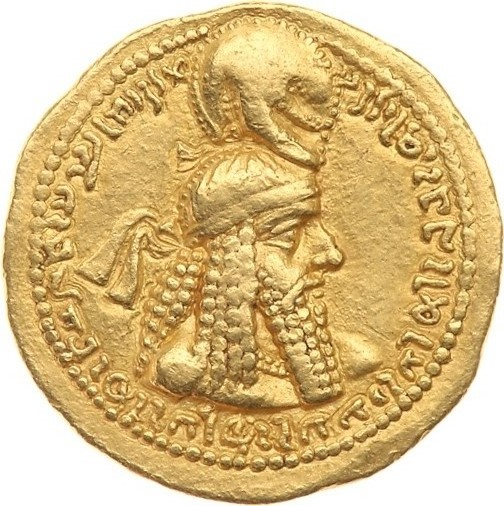
- Gold dinar of Ardashir I, 230 AD

King of Kings of the Sasanian Empire
- Reign: 224–242
- Coronation: 226; Ctesiphon
- Predecessor: Artabanus IV (Parthia)
- Successor: Shapur I
- Co-ruler: Shapur I (240–242)

King of Persis
- Reign: 211/2–224
- Predecessor: Shapur
- Successor: Office abolished
- Born: 180; Tiruda, Khir, Persis, Parthian Empire
- Died: February 242 (aged 61–62)
- Spouse: Denag; Murrod
- Issue: Shapur I
- House: House of Sasan
- Father: Pabag or Sasan
- Mother: Rodag
- Religion: Zoroastrianism

Ardashir I (Middle Persian: 𐭠𐭥𐭲𐭧𐭱𐭲𐭥, romanized: Arda(x)šēr), also known as Ardashir the Unifier (180–242 AD), was the Persian king of Persis and the founder of the Sasanian Empire, the last empire of ancient Iran. After defeating Artabanus IV, the last King of Kings of Parthia, on the Hormozdgan plain in 224, he overthrew the Arsacid dynasty and established the Sasanian dynasty. Afterwards, Ardashir called himself King of Kings (Šâhân Šâh) and began conquering the land that he called Ērānšahr, the realm of the Iranians. Ardashir I founded an empire described by scholars as the “Second Persian Empire” or the “Neo-Persian Empire.”

There are various historical reports about Ardashir's lineage and ancestry. According to al-Tabari's History of the Prophets and Kings, Ardashir was son of Papak, son of Sasan. Another narrative recorded in Kar-Namag i Ardashir i Pabagan and Ferdowsi's Shahnameh states that Ardashir was born from the marriage of Sasan, a descendant of Darius III, with the daughter of Papak, a local governor in Pars.

According to al-Tabari's report, Ardashir was born in the outskirts of Istakhr, Pars. Al-Tabari adds that Ardashir was sent to the lord of Fort Darabgard when he was seven years old. After the lord's death, Ardashir succeeded him and became the commander of Fort Darabgard. Afterwards, Papak overthrew the local Persian shah named Gochihr and appointed his son, Shapur, instead of him. Shapur and his father, Papak, suddenly died and Ardashir became the ruler of Pars. Tension rose between Ardashir and the Parthian empire, and eventually on April 28, 224, Ardashir faced the army of Artabanus IV in the Hormozdgan plain, where the Parthian shahanshah was defeated and killed in battle.

According to the royal reports, it was Papak who overthrew Gochihr, the local Persian shah, and appointed his son, Shapur, instead of him; Ardashir refused to accept Shapur's appointment and removed his brother and whosoever stood against him and then minted coins with his face drawn on and his father, Papak's behind. It is probable that the determining role that is stated about Ardashir in leading the rebellion against the central government is the product of the later historical studies. Papak had probably united most of Pars under his rule by then.

Ardashir had an outstanding role in developing the royal ideology. He tried to show himself as a worshiper of Mazda and a descendant of the gods who possesses khvarenah, the divine royal glory attributed to kings in Zoroastrianism. In order to legitimize his rule and delegitimize that of the Parthians, he claimed descent from mythical Iranian shahs and presented himself as a continuator of the Achaemenids, the creators of the first Persian empire, although the current belief is that the early Sasanians did not know much about the history of the Achaemenids. On the other hand, some historians believe that the first Sasanian shahanshahs were familiar with the Achaemenids and their successors deliberately turned to the legendary Kayanians. They knowingly ignored the Achaemenids in order to attribute their past to the Kayanians; and that was where they applied holy historiography.

In order to remark his victories, Ardashir carved petroglyphs in Firuzabad (the city of Gor or Ardashir-Khwarrah), Naqsh-e Rajab and Naqsh-e Rustam. In his petroglyph in Naqsh-e Rustam, Ardashir and Ahura Mazda are opposite to each other on horsebacks and the corpses of Artabanus and Ahriman are visualized under the hooves of the horses of Ardashir and Ahura Mazda. It can be deduced from the picture that Ardashir assumed or wished for others to assume that his rule over the land that was called "Iran" in the inscriptions was designated by the lord. The word "Iran" was previously used in Avesta and as "the name of the mythical land of the Aryans". In Ardashir's period, the title "Iran" was chosen for the region under the Sasanian rule. The idea of "Iran" was accepted for both the Zoroastrian and non-Zoroastrian societies in the whole kingdom and the Iranians' collective memory continued and lived on in the various stages and different layers of the Iranian society until the modern period today. What is clear is that the concept of "Iran" previously had a religious and ethnic application and then ended up creating its political face and the concept of a geographical collection of lands.

== Etymology ==
"Ardashir" is the New Persian form of the Middle Persian name , which is ultimately from Old Iranian *Artaxšaθra-, equivalent to Greek Artaxérxēs (Αρταξέρξης), and Armenian Artašēs (Արտաշէս). Literally, Ardashir means "the one whose reign is based on honesty and justice". The first part of *Arta-xšaθra- is adapted from the religious concept of justice known as Ṛta or Asha and the second part is related to the concept "city" and "kingdom".

Three of Achaemenid kings of kings and four of the local Shahs of Pars—known as Frataraka and Kings of Persis—were named Ardashir, and Ardashir I has been Ardashir V in the chain of local Shahs.

== Historiography ==
The primary references of the Sassanian era can be divided to the two categories "text remnants" and "reports":

=== Text remnants ===
Text remnants include inscriptions, leather writings, papyri and crockeries written in multiple languages and scripts. Examples of text remnants related to Ardashir I include his short inscription in Naqsh-e Rajab and also Shapur I's inscription at the Ka'ba-ye Zartosht.

=== Reports ===
Reports are texts that are written in various languages and periods. The basis of the writings of all Muslim historians (Arabic and Persian histories), has been the official Khwaday-Namag of the Sassanian court that have utilized the recorded diaries in the official calendars of the court as references. Khwaday-Namag was prepared at the end of the Sassanian era in Middle Persian. The title of the Arabic translation of the book was Seir-ol Moluk-el Ajam and the Persian version was Shahnameh. Today, none of the direct translations of Khwaday-Namag or its original Persian text are available.

==== Greek-Roman ====
Cassius Dio is one of the resources of Parthian history that has given a report about the downfall of the Parthians and the rise of Ardashir I.

Herodian's History has also extensively explained the procedure of the change of monarchy from Parthian to Sassanian.

Although Agathias lived during the time of Khosrow I, due to his access to the royal yearbooks in Ctesiphon archives, his history book is one of the main sources. However, he has used colloquial statements in reporting the story of Ardashir's youth.

==== Armenian ====
The Armenian history in the Sassanian era is completely connected with Iranian royal history; thus, not only do the writings of then Armenian historians provide important matters about the adventures of Iranian kings of kings, but show the status of Iran-Armenia relations. Armenian History by Agathangelos is one of Armenian resources about the early Sassanian era.

Movses Khorenatsi, known as the Armenian Herodotus, an historian of the fifth century AD has stated a story about Ardashir I that is relatively similar to the adapted story from the biography of Cyrus the Great.

==== Syriac ====
Another class of Sasanian history references is the books written by Christians in Syriac language.

Arbella's Chronicles is a text written in mid-sixth century AD and includes the history of Christian regions of Mesopotamia from the second century until 550. The book is very valuable for the period of the downfall of the Parthians and the rise of the Sasanians.

History of Odessa is a book written in 540 and includes chronicles from 132 BC until 540.

Chronicles of Karakh Beit Solug, is a short but important source that presents valuable information about the early Sasanian period.

==== Middle Persian ====
Kār-Nāmag ī Ardašīr ī Pābagān is an epic story about Ardashir I and the procedure of his ascension to the throne of Iran. The text was written in about 600 AD and in the end of Sasanian era in Middle Persian language.

==== New Persian ====
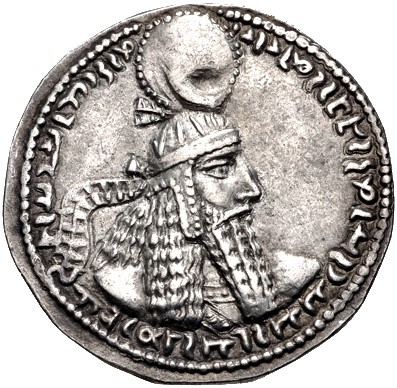
Drachma of Ardashir I, minted at Hamadan between 233 and 239

Ferdowsi's Shahnameh is the largest and most important reference about the reports related to the national Iranian history. It presents helpful information about the Sasanian organizations and civilization.

Bal'ami's History, which is a Persian rewrite of Tabari's History, is one of the most important Persian prose works about the Sasanians. Apart from the Arabic text, the work is valuable, since it provides the Persian equals of Arabic expressions in Tabari's History.

Farsnameh is one of the helpful Persian references about Sasanian history that presents valuable information about the status and the rankings of grand appointed governors and their positions, while they were considered part of the public relative to the kings.

Ibn Isfandiyar's History of Tabaristan is another one of Sasanian history sources. The Letter of Tansar is written in the book.

Mojmal al-tawarikh is a text with limited value, since most of its reports are mentioned extensively in other sources.

Ardasgir's Oath is a letter or preach by Ardashir I about government rituals that is named in Mojmal al-tawarikh.

==== Arabic ====
Tabari's History is a book series in Arabic that is the main and essential source about Sasanian history.

Al-Masudi's The Meadows of Gold is another source about the Sasanian history.

== Lineage and ancestry ==
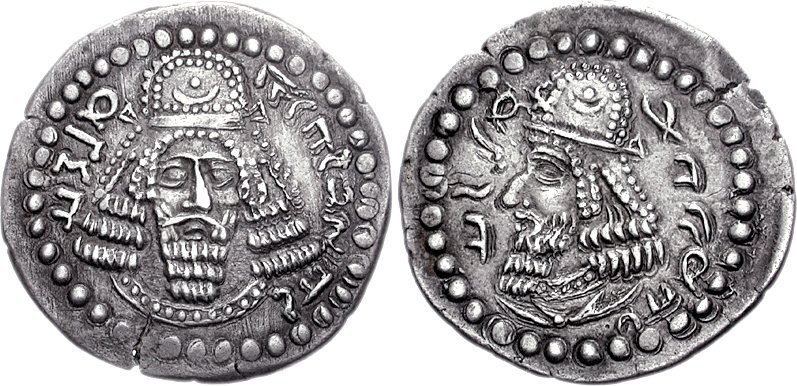
Initial coinage of Ardashir I, as King of Persis Artaxerxes (Ardaxsir) V. c. 205/6–223/4. Obv: Bearded facing head, wearing diadem and Parthian-style tiara, legend "The divine Ardaxir, king" in Pahlavi. Rev: Bearded head of Papak, wearing diadem and Parthian-style tiara, legend "son of the divinity Papak, king" in Pahlavi.

There are different historical reports about Ardashir's ancestry and lineage. According to Al-Tabari's report, Ardashir was son of Papak, son of Sasan. Another statement that exists in Kar-Namag i Ardashir i Pabagan and is told the same way in Ferdowsi's Shahnameh, states that Ardashir was born as a result of the marriage of Sasan, a descendant of Darius III, with the daughter of Papak, a local governor in the province of Pars. In Kar-Namag i Ardashir i Pabagan, which was written after him, Ardashir is announced "a Papakan king with a paternal line from Sasan and a maternal line from Darius III". Daryaee intends to say that according to that line in the text, it can be deduced that Ardashir has claimed his lineage to whoever he could. Relating Ardashir to the legendary Kayanians with the nickname Kay beside connecting himself to Sasan, who has been a guardian and mysterious deity and also to Dara, which is a combination of Darius I and II the Achaemenid with local Persian shahs Dara I and II, shows the former's fake lineage.

Since Ardashir had claimed his royal lineage to Sasan, it is important to inspect who Sasan was. First it was composed that the epigraphic form "Ssn" on potterywares and other documents imply that Sasan was a Zoroastrian deity, though he is not mentioned in Avesta or other ancient Iranian texts. Martin Schwartz has recently shown that the deity shown on the potterywares is not related to Sasan, but shows Ssn, an old Semitic goddess that was worshiped in Ugarit in the second millennium B.C. The word "Sasa" is written on coins found in Taxila; it is probable to be related to "Sasan", since the symbols on the mentioned coins are similar to the coins of Shapur I. It is remarked in Ferdowsi's Shahnameh about Sasan's Oriental lineage that might imply that his house had come from the Orient. After all and considering all the difficulties, it can be said that Ardashir claimed his lineage to be belonging to gods and the Sasanians may have raised Sasan's rank to a god's. The primary Islamic sources, which are adapted from Sasanian statements, have emphasized on Sasan being a mysticist and hermit and have actually stated India, which is the center of asceticism, as Sasan's origin. That was the only way for Ardashir to forge himself a double noble-religious lineage. It is not strange that Ardashir's religious lineage is emphasized in religious Sasanian statements and his noble lineage is emphasized in royal reports and then they are linked to religious statements about him. Anyway, whoever Sasan was and wherever he lived, he was not a native Persian and the eastern and western Iranian Plateau are mentioned as his origins in the references.

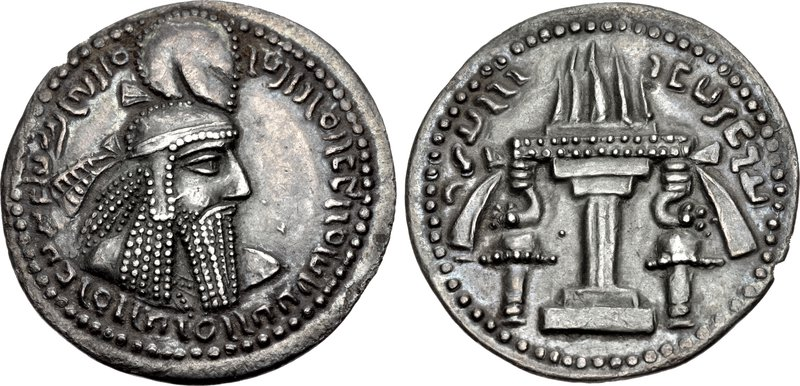
Silver drachma of Ardashir I, struck at the Hamadan mint, dated c. 238–239. The obverse of the coin depicts Ardashir I with legend "The divine Mazdayasnian King Ardashir, King of King of the Iranians", while the reverse shows a fire altar with the legend "Ardashir's fire".

Most of foreign sources are unanimous in considering an unknown lineage for Ardashir; for example, Agathias has stated that Papak was a shoemaker who found out from astronomic proofs that Sasan would have a great son; thus Papak allowed Sasan to sleep with the former's wife and the result was Ardashir. Shakki considered Agathias's narrative a useless and vulgar story by the familiar Sergeus, Surianian translator of Khosrow I's court, ordered by the opponents and foes of Sasanians. Shakki said it was obvious Sergeus the Christian had induced that nonsense to Agathias. Like he had cleared Ardashir's family tree, and it was adapted from the imaginations of Christians and the materialist and atheist league. Shakki's reasoning is based on the current norm in marital customs that the children resulting from a woman's marriage with a second spouse (after divorcing her first spouse) will belong to the first spouse. In the three-language inscription of Shapur I's on Ka'ba-ye Zartosht in Naqsh-e Rustam, Sasan is introduced only as a nobleman and Papak as a king.

There are opinions about the validity and authenticity of each of the mentioned narratives. Some have considered Al-Tabari's report suspicious since he presents an elaborate family tree of Ardashir that relates his generation to mythical and mighty ancient Iranian kings. Some consider the reports of Karnamag and Shahnameh more justifiable, since Ardashir being Sasan's son and his adoption by Papak aligns with Zoroastrian norms and customs. However, some have questioned the reports of Karnamag and Shahnameh, considered them mythical and intended to legitimize the founder of the Sasanian dynasty.

Due to the high number of reports about Ardashir's lineage, it is not easy to accept any; though it should not be ignored that most of the founders of dynasties claimed to be descendants of ancient kings in order to become legitimate. About that, Daryaee says: "If Ardashir had been evolved from a noble house, he would have insisted on a report; while various stories show that he intended to gain legitimacy from all Iranian traditions and perhaps foreign tribes."

In sources, Ardashir's religious relations and his father being a cleric are mentioned; so it can be deduced that Ardashir had no connections with royal houses and was only a cleric's son who knew about religion, but was not a cleric himself; and that was how he, by his religious knowledge, found the chance to be the first person in his inscriptions receiving the royal ring from Ahura Mazda, something a Persian nobleman did not need and only a newcomer had to claim to be from the line of gods. It should be mentioned that it was not precedent to Ardashir to take a royal ring from Ahura Mazda, and it is not seen even in Achaemenid inscriptions.

== Pars before rise of the Sasanians ==
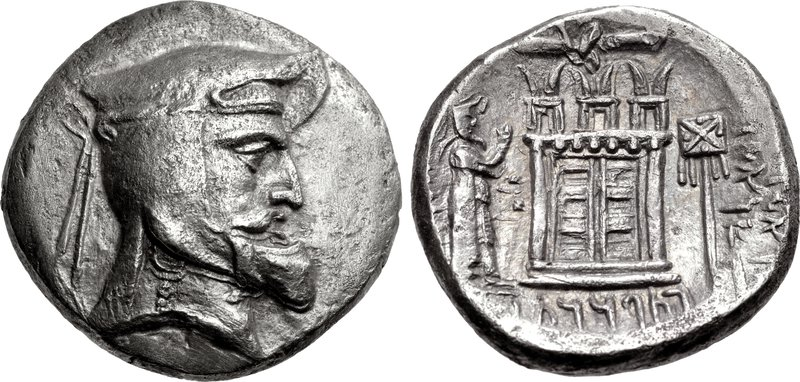
Drachma of Vadfradad I; the picture behind it is a structure similar to Ka'ba-ye Zartosht.

Persis, the state in which the movement of establishing the new Sasanian government began, had lost its fame by third century AD. Since old times, a new city named Istakhr had risen beside the ruins of Persepolis, an Achaemenid capital which was burnt by troops of Alexander III of Macedon. Although the land's local shahs picked themselves Achaemenid names like Dara (Darius) and Ardashir in order to preserve old traditions, that was almost the only remaining instance of the ancient magnificence and greatness. The local governors of Pars that considered themselves the rightful heirs of the Achaemenids, had accepted submitting to the Arsacids during the four and a half century of the latters' reign and always waited for a chance to retake their old glory. They considered the Parthians primordial usurpers who had taken the formers' right by force.

The remnants of Pasargadae and Persepolis could be permanent memorials of the past magnificence of Pars; though the knowledge about the existence of a large empire was almost forgotten.

As of now, not much knowledge is gained about the four hundred-year history of that state, which was once part of the Seleucid Kingdom and then of Parthian Empire, and almost all the knowledge about the political status of Pars—before the rise of Ardashir, depends on the coins which were minted by the local semi-dependent kings; based on the existent information on the Persian coins, at least one local king ruled in Persian lands slightly after the demise of Alexander III. Even if the existence of the names of kings like Dara and Ardashir on the coins of local shahs of the land does not prove that a subsidiary house of the Achaemenids still ruled in Pars, it at least shows the continuance of some of Achaemenid traditions in that land.

During the Seleucid era, the Frataraka (local Persian shahs) ruled Pars at the time of the rebellion of Alexander, Molon's brother, against Antiochus III. That shows those local shahs shared power with Seleucid satraps or each of them ruled part of Pars separately. Also in the Parthian era, the local Persian shahs were entitled to mint coins with their own names like some other semi-dependent shahs of the Parthian Empire. During the time, the Persian governors called themselves "Frataraka", which probably meant "governor" based on its synonym achieved from the Aramaic documents of the Achaemenid era. Afterwards, the titles of local governors altered and they named themselves "Shahs". There have been royal crowns and symbols, temple pictures, fireboxes with aflame fires, and symbols of the moon, stars and the portrait of Ahura Mazda minted on coins of the Frataraka that shows the holy fire was adored and the Zoroastrian gods were worshiped and the old creed was permanent in Pars in contrast to other regions.

In a portrait of Papak and his son Shapur carved on Takht-e Jamshid, Papak, while dressed as a priest, squeezes the hilt of his sword by one hand and manipulates the fire of the hearth and adds more firewood to it by the other hand, with his son Shapur taking the royal ring from him. In other pictures of granting the royal medal during the time, meaning granting Khwasak, the mayor of Susa, which is discovered there, and the picture of granting the medal to the governor of Elymais, discovered in Bardneshandeh, the Parthian emperor is granting the royal medal to local shahs; while in the mentioned picture of Papak and his son Shapur in Takht-e Jamshid, it is Papak who is granting the royal ring to Shapur wearing like priests. Lokonin believed that the carving of Papak granting the royal medal to his son shows that the Sasanians took the power by force in Pars and wished to show their independence from the Parthian emperors; that was why Papak personally grants the royal medal to his son in the mentioned picture. Lokonin also believes that the religious clothes and medals of Papak on the pictures and coins of Shapur (his son), show the separation of religious and royal rule -at the time; Papak was the grand priest and his son Shapur was the land's shah. Daryaee believes that the picture shows multiple things; first that the House of Sasan had both the religious and irreligious powers together in Pars; second that the fire creed, related to Zoroastrianism, lived on before the rise of Ardashir; third that the carved picture of Shapur and Papak in Takht-e Jamshid shows the importance of the Achaemenid structure for the Sasanians.

== State of the Parthian Empire before its demise ==
After the demise of Commodus, Roman emperor, in 192 AD, a rivalry between his generals, Pescennius Niger and Septimius Severus, arose, and Vologases V, Parthian emperor, decided to support Niger against Severus. According to Herodian's History, the Parthian emperor only managed to request his local following governors to send troops to aid Niger, as Vologases V did not possess a great army. Eventually in 194, Severus won the quest for power in Rome, and he invaded Western Mesopotamia in order to retake the lost regions. The accurate details of the invasion is not known, but Osroene and Nusaybin were retaken anyway. Then Severus returned to Rome due to Clodius Albinus's rebellion; during Severus's return from Mesopotamia, the Parthian Empire was in disarray. In 197, Severus initiated hostilities with the Parthians. Meanwhile, Vologases suppressed a rebellion in the east of the Empire. Narses, governor of Adiabene (a region to the west of current Lake Urmia), disobeyed to accompany Vologases to invade the East to suppress the rebellion. The noncompliance and also Narses's friendly relations with Rome caused Vologases to attack Adiabene, to destroy multiple cities there and to also kill Narses.

Vologases later proceeded towards Nusaybin and laid siege to it, but aborted it due to Roman reinforcements and failed to capture the city. Afterwards, Severus started marching toward Euphrates and to South and took Seleucia and Babylon without resistance, although the Romans contended heavily in late 198 during the fall of Ctesiphon. However, the Romans did not manage to hold the captured regions; they had to retreat due to lack of provisions. The Romans decided to take Hatra while returning, but failed and tried once more in spring 199 to conquer Hatra, and were forced to cede control of Syria with heavy casualties. It must have been that "highly disruptive period of Vologases V's reign" and the raid and destruction of Mesopotamia by Severus when Papak probably united most of Pars under his rule. Apparently a peace treaty was then formed between the two powers, though the ancient historians have had no mention of it. Until Vologases' death in 206 or 207 and also Severus's in 211, the Parthian-Roman relations were peaceful. After Vologases V's death, his son Vologases VI rose to the throne; but shortly afterward, his reign was challenged by his brother Artabanus IV. In about 213, Artabanus launched a rebellion against his brother Vologases and took the rule of a large part of the Parthian Empire; it can be deduced from the coins found in Hamadan that he ruled the Median land.

According to an inscription of his in Susa, the control of the region is considered to have been Artabanus's. Elsewhere, Vologases VI's coins found in Seleucia show his control over the land. In Rome, Caracalla rose to power after the death of Septimius Severus, his father. Although the information about the contest between Artabanus and Vologases is trace, the Latin sources say that Caracalla gave special attention to the internal contest of Parthians and reported the disruption of the Parthians' status to the Roman Senate. Knowledge about the civil war in the Parthian Empire might have encouraged "the idea of a military conquest" in Caracalla and stimulated him towards successes larger than those of his father's (Septimius Severus) in fighting the Parthians. At the time while Emperor Caracalla had already been formulating a plan to start a new war with the Parthians, he sent a request for extradition of two fugitives, a philosopher named Antiochus and an unknown man called Tiridates, to Vologases searching for an excuse to start a war in 214 or early 215; Vologases returned the two fugitives; but Caracalla invaded Armenia anyway.

It can be deduced from Caracalla's request from Vologases for returning the two fugitives that the Romans considered Vologases the actual Parthian power and great shah at the time. About one year later in 216, Caracalla made another excuse to attack Parthia; that time he demanded Artabanus (not Vologases) to give him his daughter for marriage, which Artabanus did not accept and the war started in summer 216. According to that request of Caracalla from Artabanus, it is assumed that Aratabanus gained "the upper hand" in his internal contest with Vologases then, though Vologases' coins were minted until 221–222 in Seleucia. Although the exact path of the Romans' invasion is not known, they certainly conquered Erbil, center of Adiabene; apparently the Parthians avoided a large confrontation; but they applied an offensive policy toward Mesopotamia in early 217. That was the time Caracalla, who was heading to Harran, was killed by head of his security detail Macrinus, who showed his inclination towards peace with the Parthians by "putting the blame of starting the war on Caracalla" and "freeing Parthian prisoners"; but Artabanus demanded the Romans' "relinquishing of the whole Mesopotamia", "rebuilding the destroyed cities and fortresses" and "paying compensations for destroying the royal cemetery of Erbil", knowing of having the upper hand.

Macrinus refused the extensive demands of the Parthians and war was restarted and its peak was in a three-day battle in Nusaybin. Although there is controversy about the result of the battle in the views of the ancient world's historians, the aftermath of the battle was obviously Roman defeat. After the end of the war, peace negotiations began and resulted in a peace treaty in 218 according to which the Romans paid 50 million dinars to the Parthians and kept Armenia and Northern Mesopotamia. It was probably in about 220 that the local Persian governors (Ardashir I) started taking far and close lands. At the time, Artabanus did not pay much attention to his actions and decided to fight him when it had become too late. Eventually, Ardashir ended the life of the House of Arsaces in the Battle of Hormozdgan and founded the Sasanian dynasty. However, the end of the Parthian dynasty did not mean an endpoint for all Parthian houses. Movses Khorenatsi, Armenian historian, has quoted some reports of the roles and aids of some Parthian houses, like Suren and Ispahbudhan, in Ardashir's uprising.

== Biography ==
=== Early years until his uprising and gaining power ===
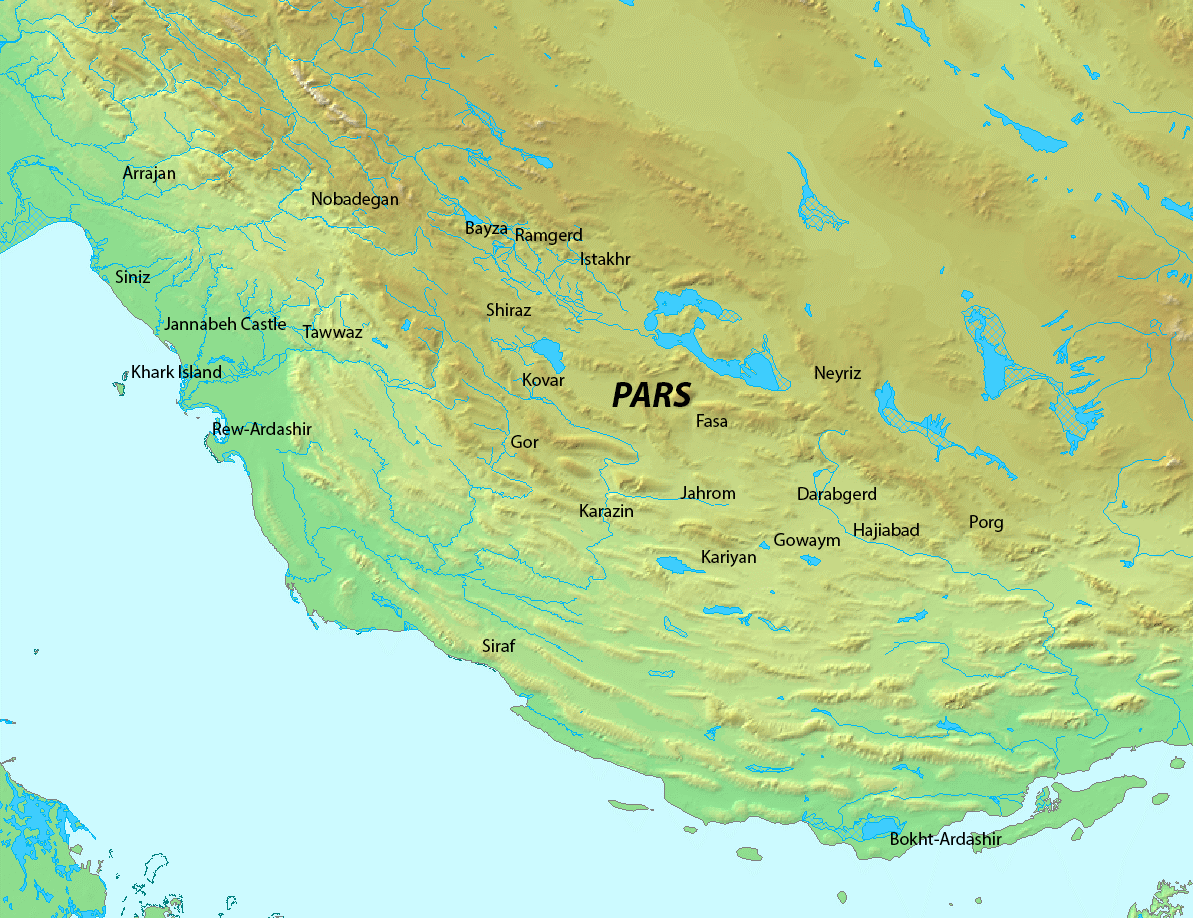
Map of Pars.

According to Al-Tabari's report, Ardashir was born in a village named "Tirudeh" in the district of "Khir" around Istakhr, Pars in an established family. His grandfather, Sasan, was the trustee of the Temple of Anahita in Istakhr and his grandmother was Rambehesht from Bazrangi House. Al-Tabari added that when Ardashir was seven years old, Papak, Ardashir's father, asked Gochihr, local shah in Pars, to send Ardashir to Tiri, commander of Fort Darabgard, for raising, which Gochihr did. After Tiri's death, Ardashir took over for him and became the commander of Fort Darabgard.

According to the current sources, Papak was the priest of the Fire Temple of Anahita. He managed to assemble local Persian warriors who believed in the deity. At the time, Vologases V's reign was disrupted due to the invasion of Septimius Severus, Roman emperor, on Mesopotamia. It is probable that Vologases defeated Papak after he rebelled and forced him to submit to Parthian rule for a while. It is not probable that Papak's kingdom was beyond the Persian land.

According to Arabic-Persian sources, Ardashir started his uprising when he was the commander of Fort Darabgard in eastern Pars. The oldest archaeological proofs of the period of Ardashir's reign are acquired from Ardashir-Khwarrah (Gor or current Firuzabad) in south border of Pars. Therefore, Ardashir rose up in his war in Ardashir-Khwarrah, far from the fortress of local Persian shahs in Istakhr and farther from the Parthian Empire. The beginning of Ardashir's uprising may be related to his first inscription in Firuzabad; in the inscription, he is shown acquiring the royal ring from Ahura Mazda in front of his henchmen. Ardashir began the procedure of extending his reign by killing some local kings and taking their domains. According to Al-Tabari's report, Ardashir then asked Papak to stand against Gochihr and start a rebellion. Papak did it and rebelled against Gochihr and killed him. Daryaee believes that Papak was a local governor who dreamed of conquering Istakhr and was eventually able to achieve it by the help of his older son Shapur; that means in contrast to Al-Tabari's report, it was not Ardashir's request and order that caused Papak's rebellion against Gochihr, governor of Istakhr, and it can be implied from the common coins of Papak and Shapur. Later, Papak wrote a letter to Artabanus IV and requested permission to appoint Shapur instead of the "overthrown" Gochihr in power; in response, Artabanus announced Papak and Ardashir outlaws. Although Artabanus had defeated the Romans, he faced the problem of the defiance of Vologases VI, who had minted coins in his own name between 221 and 222; and this shows that no powerful emperor controlled the Parthian Empire then. During the time that Artabanus was dealing with a more important challenge, he could not pay much attention to the rise of a newcomer in Pars. After a while, Papak died in an unknown date and Shapur ascended to the throne; afterward, the contest and fight started between the two brothers (Shapur and Ardashir), but Shapur died in an accidental way. According to sources, Shapur stopped at a ruin while assaulting Darabgard and a stone suddenly separated from the ceiling and hit his head and Shapur succumbed immediately. After the incident, the brothers relinquished the Persian throne and crown to Ardashir, who became the Persian Shah thereafter. Ardashir and his followers could be considered the main suspects of Shapur's mysterious death, since they "benefitted from the accidental death"; but the accusation is not provable.

Papak's picture has been drawn on both Shapur's coins and later Ardashir's; in the picture of the Papak drawn on Shapur's coins, he wears a wig dissimilar to normal Parthian and local Persian shahs and only Shapur has worn a royal wig. According to royal reports, it was Papak who overthrew Gochihr and appointed Shapur instead of him. Ardashir refused to accept Shapur's appointment and removed his brother and whoever stood against him and then minted coins with his face drawn on them and Papak's behind them. Papak's picture on Ardashir-Papak coins, wears a wig similar to those of local Persian shahs in contrast to his picture in Shapur-Papak coins. According to the descriptions given on Papak's pictures on the coins, it is probable that the determining role of Ardashir depicted in leading the rebellion against the central government is the product of later historical studies. It is probable that Papak had united most of Pars under his rule by the time; since his picture exists on Ardashir's coins too.

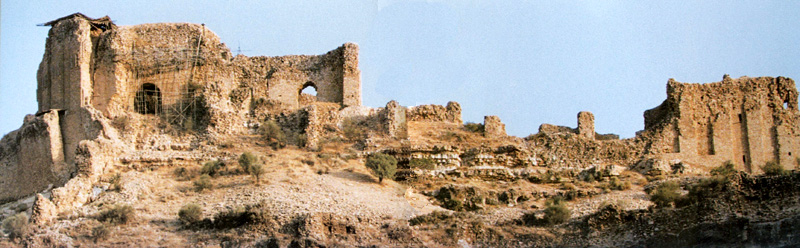
Ghaleh Dokhtar, or "The Maiden's Castle", Iran, built by Ardashir I in AD 209, before he was finally able to defeat the Parthian empire.

In the procedure of extending his domain and power, Ardashir made many Parthian-dependent local shahs and landlords follow him. In the first phase of rebellion, Ardashir challenged the Parthians' central power by actions like minting coins and constructing new cities. After all, a sight of victory was not imaginable for Ardashir without a public dissatisfaction and interest in rebellion against the Parthians. For example, according to sources, the governor of a land northeast of Ctesiphon called "Beth Garmai" in Syriac and its center was today Kirkuk, along with Sharat, who was the governor of Adiabene, aided Ardashir in his rebellion against the Parthians. In order to consolidate his power, Ardashir killed some of the important figures in Darabgard; then he seized Kerman and subsequently took control of whole Pars, including the Persian Gulf shores. At that time, Ardashir constructed a palace and fire temple in Gor (current Firuzabad) that its ruins still remain and is called the Palace of Ardashir. He appointed one of his sons named Ardashir as the governor of Kerman. Artabanus, the Parthian emperor, ordered the governor of Susa to attack Ardashir, suppress his rebellion and send him to Ctesiphon. After Ardashir defeated and killed Shadh-Shapur, the governor of Spahan, he headed towards Khuzestan and killed the governor of Susa as well, and added his domain to the lands under his rule. Then he invaded Characene State in the mouth of Tigris and took it and added it to his kingdom.

Eventually, in Ardashir's contest with Artabanus in the Battle of Hormozdgan on April 28, 224, Artabanus was killed by Ardashir and the Parthian dynasty was overthrown with his death. The year of the occurrence of the battle is confirmed by Shapur I's inscription in Bishapur. The extended report of the Battle of Hormozdgan is probably made for the Sasanian's formal history. If the mentioned assumption is right, the writing may have been the main source of Al-Tabari's History. After Artabanus's death, Ardashir's quest for extending his kingdom did not end. In a procedure, the large landlord Parthian houses, either submitted to Ardashir (willingly or unwillingly) or were conquered by him.

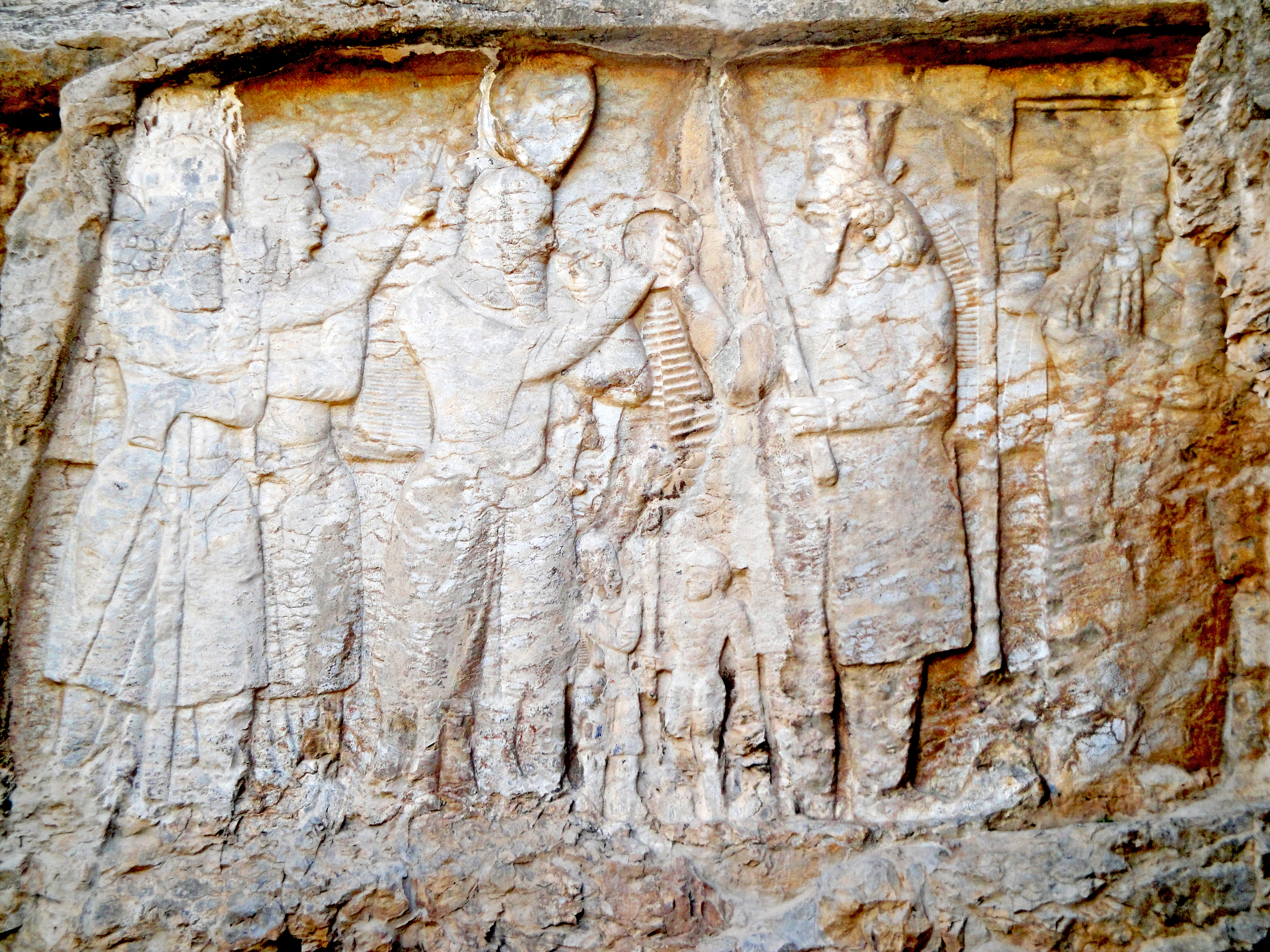
Ardashir I is receiving the Kingship's ring from Ahuramazda at Naqsh-e Rajab.

The subsequent sources emphasized on the Sasanians' hatred of everything adapted from the Parthians. The existence of such a mentality in Ardashir is understandable; but even he was forced to establish his newborn government on Parthian foundations by the help of other remarkable Iranian houses, who were either affiliated with the Parthians or nursed by them. However, no change is seen in that hatred of the Parthians in the next generations of Sasanian emperors either. Therefore, it can be deduced that the Parthians enforced a more hard and tyrannical domination than presumed on their submitted shahs and that might have been the reason that facilitated Ardashir's conquest.

=== After coronation ===
There is controversy among specialists about the year of Ardashir's coronation; according to W.B. Henning's studies and calculations, Ardashir was crowned on April 28, 224; however, the calculations of H. Taqizadeh show the date April 6, 227. Josef Wiesehöfer believes the year of Ardashir's coronation in Ctesiphon 226 and at the time of his invasion on Northern Mesopotamia based on other sources.

Anyway, by choosing the title Shahanshah (king of kings), Ardashir revealed his inclination toward government. During about 226–227, Ardashir experienced a failed attempt to conquer Hatra, which was previously unsuccessfully tried by Trajan and Septimius Severus, while on a crusade for taking the northwest regions of the land. In the late Parthian era, Hatra had become semi-dependent due to the gradual deterioration of the central government. After that unsuccessful attempt of Ardashir's in the west, he started taking eastern lands and dominating large Parthian landlords, local noblemen and large Iranian houses and was successful. The exact extent and limits of Ardashir's ruled domain can not be determined correctly. Ardashir's domain in the west was probably extended to the traditional borders between the Romans and Parthians in the northwest; in the east, the Kushan and Turan and probably Merv Desert rulers surrendered to Ardashir's empire; and in the southwest, the northern part of "Arabic shores of the Persian Gulf"were taken by war. According to Al-Masudi, Ardashir had some relation with a Platonist by the name of Bihir at the beginning of his reign, however he only mentions the existence of Bihir, saying that he has already covered him at length in his now-lost work, the Akhbar al-Zaman.

=== War with Rome ===
According to the information collected from Latin and Greek sources, the first clash between the "newborn Sasanian power" in its west borders with Rome occurred by the Persians' attack on the regions held by Rome in Northern Mesopotamia on Ardashir's era, 230. Ardashir besieged Nusaybin, which was one of the two fortresses of Roman defense system in Mesopotamia -the other being Harran, but was not able to take it; the Sasanian riders' assault was pulled to other Syrian regions and Cappadocia and they invaded it. After the Romans' unfruitful attempt to make peace with Ardashir, Severus Alexander eventually decided to oppose the Persians unwillingly and reluctantly in 232. The Roman forces led by Alexander attacked Armenia by one military column and the south by two columns. Although there is no accurate information about the details of the events, it is known that the Romans achieved some victories in the north (Armenia); but the troops sent to Southern Mesopotamia did not achieve anything.

In any case, "the first war test between the Sasanians and Romans" ended without any positive result for the Romans; though Alexander held a celebration in Rome for his "victory" and the war has been viewed as a victory in some Roman writings due to preserving the past borders of the Roman empire and Alexander appeared as a victor in Rome. In the war, many casualties were inflicted upon the two armies. In subsequent Arabic-Persian sources, there has been no mention of the war; the cause of not mentioning might have been Ardashir considering the incident shameful.

Although no peace treaty was signed, the eastern Roman borders were not attacked by the Sasanians in the next years. It might have been more important for the Romans to attach Hatra to their fortresses of the border defense system. The people of Hatra knew that their relative autonomy, which became possible at the late Parthian era due to the weakness of the central government, was under the threat of the policies announced by the Sasanians. The foreign policy of the new Persian rulers was to proceed to the Occident and that was probably in order to divert the public attention from the internal problems of the land; that is while the procedure of the Parthians and the Romans in the final years was to leave everything be as they are.

The murder of Severus Alexander by his soldiers and its aftermath which resulted in disturbances in Rome, motivated Ardashir to attack Rome again. In about the years 237–238, Ardashir took Nusaybin and Harran and attacked the city Dura; then he marched toward Hatra, which was a commercial city and the center of the traffic of commercial caravans. Hatra stood hard against the Persian siege and did not fall until April or September 240; it seems that Hatra was chosen as a point for pushing and operation against Roman Mesopotamia. The fall of Hatra might have been the cause of Gordian III's wars with Persia.

In the mythical-national Persian history, the Battle of Hatra and the incident of its fall is accompanied with a romantic story. According to the story, at the time of the Persian attack on Hatra, the daughter of the city's king had fallen in love with Shapur I, Ardashir's son and had him promise her marriage and then opened the gate of the city; then the Persians captured the city and destroyed it. After Shapur found out about the kindness and attention of the father towards his daughter on the wedding night, the former had her killed due to the daughter's inappreciation to that kind of father.

=== Final years and succession ===
Due to the difficulties in the sources, the last years and the day of Ardashir's death are not very clear. His son, Shapur probably ascended as a royal partner on April 12, 240. The time is found from the Pirchavush inscriptions in Salmas, Northwestern Iran that show Shapur's royal participation. The answer to the question if Shapur was crowned as a shah without a partner during Ardashir's life depends on the interpretation a special kind of coin. On those coins, the faces of Ardashir and Shapur are carved together. Adding Shapur to his royal position was probably Ardashir's plan to solve the succession problem without any troubles; the reason was that Ardashir had other sons and feared that they might have craved the throne like himself.

About the year of Shapur's participation in reign with Ardashir, it has been written in Cologne Mani-Codex in Greek about Mani's life:

When I became twenty-four years old; in the year that Persian king, Dari-Ardashir opened the city Hatra, and in the year Shapur Shah, his son, put the largest crown in the month Famuthi, on the month day (8th day of Farmuthi), my god, who is the most blessed, made me proud by his generosity, summoned me by his favor...

It can be deduced by calculating the Egyptian month and year that Shapur's coronation as his father's royal partner occurred on April 12, 240 (the first day of the Babylonian month Nisan in the year 551). Ardashir and Shapur's simultaneous reign lasted apparently until early 242. Therefore, it can be said that Shapur was probably crowned twice; once as a royal partner in 240 and later in 243 as lonely reign; however it is more likely that he was crowned only once in 240.

=== Timeline of life ===
According to three dates that are achieved from Shapur's inscription on a column in Bishapur, the period between 205 and 206 appears as the beginning of an era in Sasanian history; it is written in the first lines of the mentioned inscription:

1- Farvardin 58, 2- Azar Ardashir 40, 3- Azar Shapur from royal Azars 24

Therefor, history is designated with "three eras" in the inscription; "Azar Ardashir 40" means the 40th year in Ardashir's era and "Azar Shapur 24" means the 24th year in Shapur's era. 58 shows an era that has remained unknown. It has been deduced from the allusion that one of the mentioned events (overthrowing the local shah of Istakhr by Papak or announcing independence from the Parthians) has happened between the years 205 and 206; since the year is implied as "the year of the beginning of an era". The assumption that "the period between the years 205 and 206" is related to Papak's rebellion is very probable since "the period between the years 205 and 206" was never a basis in any of the future achieved histories from the Sasanians and usually every Sasanian emperor either based the calendar on the year of "his ascension" or based it on the Seleucid calendar that began with 312 B.C. R. Ghirshman believes that the year 58 shows the beginning of the domination of the Sasanian dynasty over the Iranian lands. Besides, the date of altering the Persian coins along with which the names of previous governors were replaced with the Sasanian dynasty can be accepted to be 205–206. It is very probable that Papak took the royal throne of Istakhr between the years 205/206 and 211/212 and appointed his son Shapur for it; then in an insurgent action, Ardashir moved to Gur (Ardashir-Khwarrah or current Firuzabad) from Darabgard and raised his defense fortifications there in order to be able to attack his older brother just after the death of his father, Papak. "The first inscription of Ardashir's quest of the crown" in Firuzabad is probably the symbol of his rebellion against his father and brother. Papak probably died in about 211/212 and it is after that when his two sons (Shapur and Ardashir) minted coins titled "The Shah" and decorated them with the face of their recently deceased father (Papak) behind. The report of Zin-el-Akhbar also confirms that Ardashir was crowned as a local shah in 211/212. The events of 211/212, which contain the defeat of Shapur (Ardashir's brother) and his probable murder, might be related to Ardashir's second inscription on Naqsh-e Rajab and also minting coins without the Papak's face. The writing of the phrase "his majesty worshiping Mazda, Ardashir the Persian Shah" on some second group of coins of Ardashir's might have been after his conquest of Istakhr and taking control of Pars. Ardashir's conquest of Pars and taking the adjacent lands was a threat for Artabanus; therefore, Artabanus defied Ardashir and eventually lost the Battle of Hormozdgan and was killed. It was after that when Ardashir was able to claim being "the Shahanshah of Iranians". Ardashir carved a memorial inscription for victory in the Battle of Hormozdgan near the city Gur. The signs of these events (the period between taking Istakhr until conquering Ctesiphon and formal coronation there) are shown in the inscription of Ardashir's coronation in Naqsh-e Rostam and also the alteration of his coins.

== Reign infrastructure ==
=== The procedure of centralization of power ===
Ardashir I and his Dastur (Councillor). Page from the Great Mongol Shahnameh. Keir Collection

The history of the Sasanian society can be studied based on two completely opposite principles; one was the central power, whose incarnation was the "shahanshah" himself and constantly attempted to increase his power; and on the other hand was the liegemen and grand landlords who prevented the centralization of power by the shahanshah and sometimes increased their own powers against the shah.

At first, the Sasanian policies were formed based on the relations between the shah, the royal family and the noble landlords (including members of the old Parthian high class). In Ardashir's period, though the centralization had begun and the number of local shahs had decreased sharply, his reign stood on the same bases which the Parthian empire was on after all.

According to the description of Shapur I's inscription at the Ka'ba-ye Zartosht of Ardashir's court, the latter's name is mentioned as the king of kings (shahanshah) along with four "shahs", who were the rulers of Nishapur, Marw, Kerman and Sakastan. There were also the three kingdoms Makran, Turgistan and Kushanshahr that had submitted to Ardashir's command and paid him taxes. Those local shahs were partly semi-dependent from the central government and the successions were inherited for them. However at the periods of the succeeding Sasanian shahanshahs, the independences of some of them were taken; for example at the time of Shapur I, the independences of Merv and Nishapur were taken and Sakastan became a province (city) and was granted to liegeman Narseh, son of Shapur. This shows an increasing inclination towards the centralization of power since the early Sasanian era.

The structure of the central Parthian government depended on "local noblemen" and "clan grandees" and included local autonomous governments based on "aristocracy" and "tribal interests". Ardashir had realized that it would be impossible to pursue and finish the policy of attacking and attaching without permanentizing and consolidating power in his domain; and thus, he could alter the military balance in then status and the homeland structure only by removing the local governors and establishing a central power with an organized bureaucratic system. Although the Sasanian government did not have any difference from the final Parthian era on its first days, but as mentioned, one of the prominent features of the Sasanian era was an increasing inclination toward the concentration of power in Iran since the first days of the Sasanians' uprising. In the Sasanian dawn, Iran included a union of kingdoms and noble landlords (liegemen), each of which possessed a various degree of independence from the central government and were economically connected to it by different channels. In other words, a type of feudal society under the rule of large owners stood in the Iranian Plateau while in the Mesopotamian deserts, the urban culture and pathway cities were the face of society more often.

==== Urbanization ====
The first Sasanian shahanshahs founded or renovated some cities in different Iranian regions. It is clear from the first Sasanian inscriptions that "altering the names", renovating or rebuilding of new cities were done in regions that had been conquered by Sasanian troops and were considered part of the royal property (dastkert). Those "royal cities" of the Sasanian era were the centers of military garrisons in newly taken lands and later became the centers of newfound official divisions and abodes of government agents. Therefore, the increase in the number of "royal cities" equaled with the growth of royal dastkerts; thus, instead of the autonomous cities of the Parthian era that were usually in western regions of the land and governed more of less extensive regions independently from the central government, came the "royal cities" in the early Sasanian era that were considered the garrison centers of the central government. Each of those regions were constructed to center a rural district under the rule of a "Shahrab" and the taxes of those regions were sent directly to the empire. On the other hand, beside the royal fields (dastkerts), wide lands ruled by noble landlords and local grandees also existed and the shahanshah did not have direct control over them and the taxes of those lands were paid to the royal treasury by indirect channels. That was why it became the internal goal and financial policy of Ardashir and his descendants to increase the number of royal districts and the regions attached (dastkerts); though the dichotomy of taxation between the royal lands (dastkerts) with direct taxes to the royal treasury and the lands ruled by grandees and noble landlords with indirect taxes to the royal treasury continued until the fiscal reforms at the time of Kavadh I and Khosrow I.

The cities which are believed to have been constructed by Ardashir are:

	Name of the city in the Sasanian era	Name of the city in the Islamic era	The region where the city was constructed
1	Ardashir-Khwarrah	Firuzabad	Fars
2	Rew-Ardashir	Reyshahr	Fars
3	Ram-Hormozd-Ardashir	Ramhormoz	Khuzestan
4	Hormozd-Ardashir	Ahvaz	Khuzestan
5	Ostad-Ardashir	Characene	Khuzestan
6	Vahshatabad-Ardashir	Basra	Khuzestan
7	Veh-Ardashir	Beharsir	Mesopotamia
8	Buz-Ardashir	Mosul	Mesopotamia
9	Veh-Ardashir (Kerman)	Bardsir	Kerman
10	Tan-Ardashir	Madinat-ol-Khat	Bahrain

According to Al-Tabari, Ardashir I founded eight cities, three of which were in Pars, titled "Ardashir-Khwarrah", "Ram-Ardashir" and "Riv-Ardashir"; one was in Khuzestan titled "Hormozd-Ardashir", two cities in Asoristan titled "Veh-Ardashir" and "Ostabad", one in Bahrain titled "Pasa-Ardashir" and one close to today Mosul titled "Nud-Ardashir". However, attribution of the dates of constructions of all these cities to Ardashir's royal era is doubted. For example, it is known that Shapur I founded several cities "with a name combined with Ardashir's" to honor his father; while some other are founded by other people named Ardashir.

=== Government ideology and Iranian thought ===
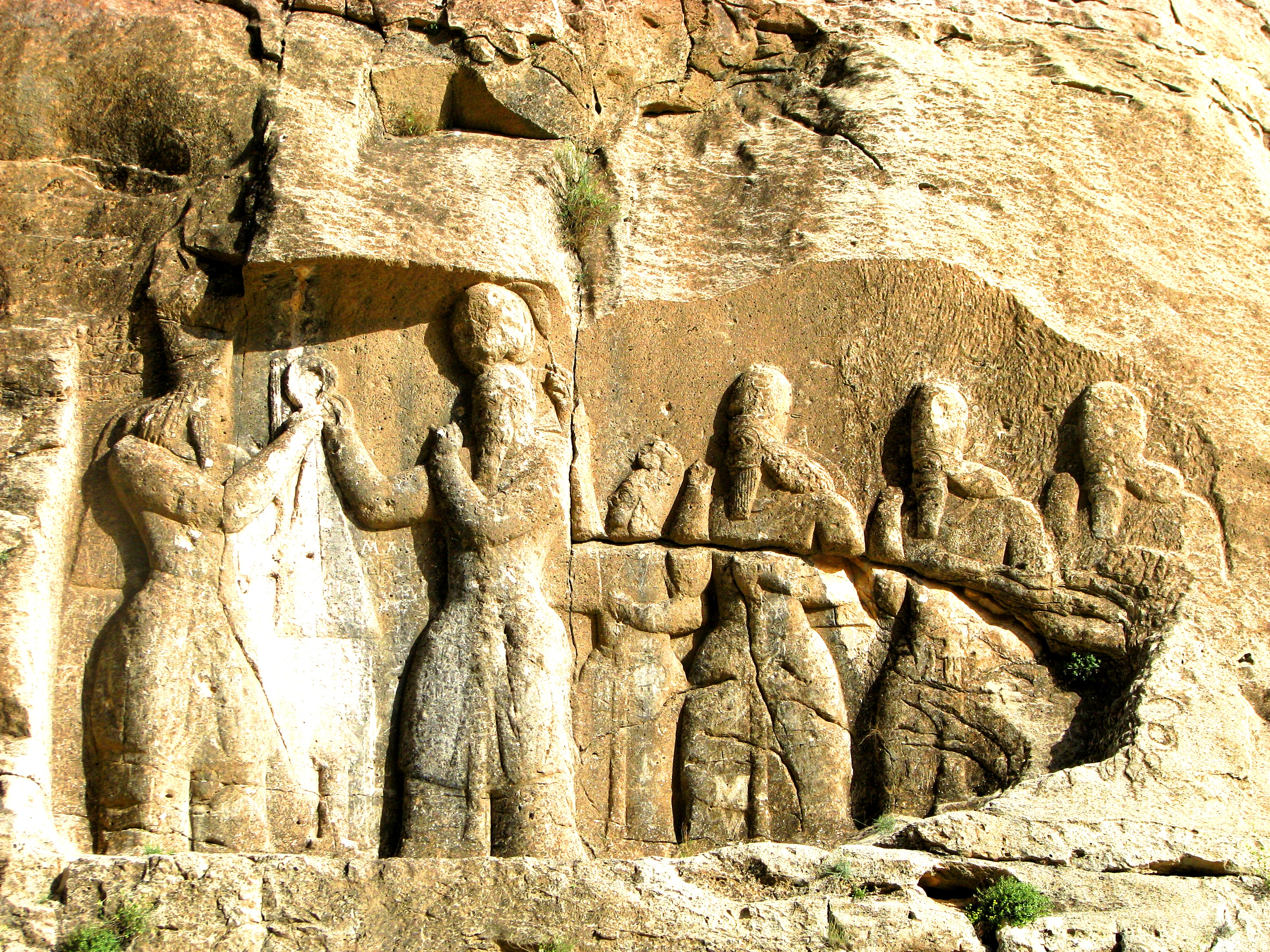
The first carving of "coronation" and the second carving of Ahura Mazda by Ardashir, Ardashir standing against his henchmen, city of Gur (current Firuzabad)

The remnants of the ruins of Pasargadae and Takht-e Jamshid could be permanent memorials of the previous magnificence of Pars; though the knowledge about the existence of a great empire was almost forgotten. According to the information from the coins of local Persian governors before the Sasanian uprising, at least one local king ruled in Persian land almost slightly after the demise of Alexander III of Macedon. The first local Persian shahs were known as "Frataraka", meaning mayors or governors. They carved the title "Lord of the Gods" (Ferehtorkeh of Baghs) on their coins; this carving was the subject of important studies. Panaino believes that by the phrase "gods" (baghs), deities like "Ahura Mazda", "Mitra" and "Anahita" are meant that were supported by Achaemenid shahs. Daryaee believes that "gods" indicates Achaemenid shahs and not "the deities they supported". He adds that the "gods" (baghs) mentioned on the coins were the Achaemenid shahs that were worshiped by the Seleucids after death. This is probably why the fact that "bagh" is translated as "god" on the coins of Ardashir and other succeeding shahs today is originated from Greek concepts.

It is deduced from onomastic and physiognomic findings that the remark of the Achaemenids and adoring fire, one of the principles of Zoroastrianism, still existed in Pars. The similarity of Ardashir I's coins with the remaining coins of local Persian shahs shows a Persian tradition and the adoring of local shahs toward it. On the coin of Hubarz, one of local Persian shahs, it is written: "Hubarz, a governor from the gods, son of a Persian". The importance of this writing is that it shows the title on Ardashir's coins "Worshiper of Mazda, Lord Ardashir, the shahanshah of Iran that has a face from the gods" is the continuation of the tradition of Fratarakas. On the other hand, with the existence of the names of kings like Darius and Artaxerxes on the coins of local shahs of the land, if it is not assumed that a subsidiary house of the Achaemenids still ruled in Pars, it at least testifies for the continuation of a part of the Achaemenid traditions. After all, the rise of the Parthians to power meant the domination of nomadic and degenerate Iranians on urban Iranians; the second faction, which was more original and nationally authentic than the first faction, looked at the Parthians with a grudge, considered them usurpers who had violated their right and Pars was the head of those regions.

Ardashir had a remarkable role in developing the royal ideology. He tried to announce himself as a Mazda worshiper connected to god and owner of divine khvarenah. The claim of his royal eligibility as a rightful newcomer from the line of mythical Iranian shahs and the propagations attributed to Ardashir against the eligibility and the role of the Parthians in the Iranian history sequence confirms the excellent place that the Achaemenid legacy had in the minds of the first Sasanian shahanshahs; though the consensus is that the Sasanians probably did not know much about the Achaemenids and the status. On the other hand, Shahbazi believes that the first Sasanian shahanshahs were familiar with the Achaemenids and their succeeding shahanshahs turned to the Kayanians deliberately. About that, Daryee adds that the Sasanians knowingly ignored the Achaemenids in order to be able to attribute their origins to the Kayanians; and that is why they applied the holy historiography. In that method, the social familiarity and bureaucracy did not matter and the court propagated its custom history by the help of the religious system. In order to remark his victories, Ardashir carved pictures in Firuzabad, Naqsh-e Rustam and Naqsh-e Rajab; on his picture in Naqsh-e Rustam, Ardashir and Ahura Mazda are opposite to each other on horsebacks and the bodies of Artabanus IV and Ahriman are visualized under the nails of Ardashir and Mazda's horses. It can be deduced from the picture that Ardashir believed or wanted others to believe that his reign over the land that is called "Iran" in inscriptions is designated by the Lord. The word "Iran" was previously used in Avesta and as "the name of the mythical Aryan land". In Ardashir's period, the title "Iran" was applied to the geography under Sasanian rule. The thought of "Iran" was accepted by both Zoroastrian and non-Zoroastrian societies in the whole empire and the collective memory of the Iranians has continued and survived until the modern period today in different stages and various layers of the Iranian society. What is clear is that the concept "Iran" has had a religious application too and has later ended in the formation of its political face meaning a collection of lands.

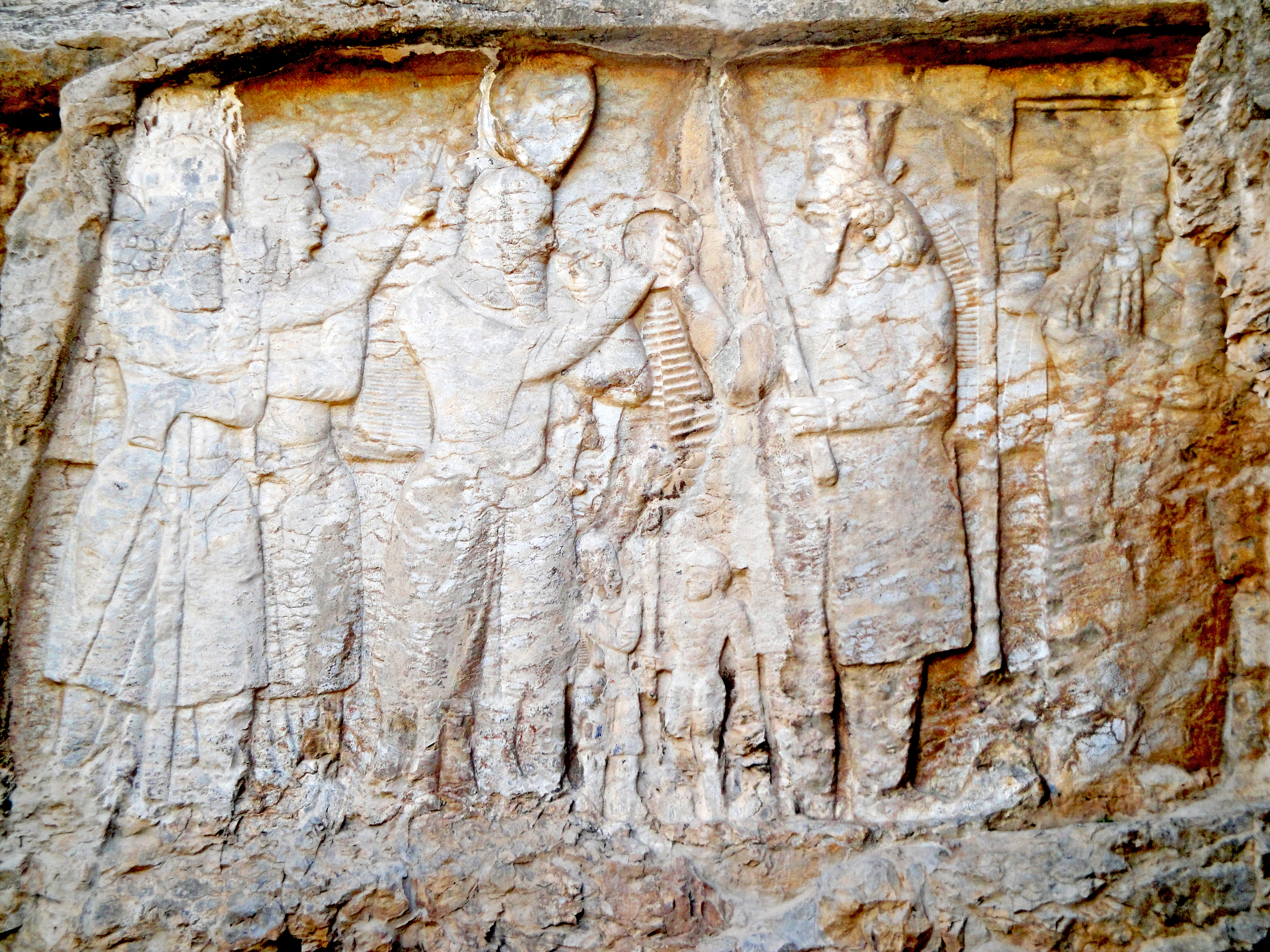
The second carving of "coronation" and the third carving of Ahura Mazda by Ardashir, carved in Naqsh-e Rajab

Choosing a place like Naqsh-e Rustam, which is mausoleum of Achaemenid shahs, for carving and inscribing, the site of the temple of Anahita in Istakhr and the existence of the names of some Achaemenid shahs as ancestors in the legendary Sasanian family tree show the existence of an inclination toward the Achaemenids in the early Sasanian period. There are many proofs in Middle Persian and Arabic-Persian writings that show the Sasanians' aggressive confrontation with Rome in order to return to the magnificent past status in the west and it had been assumed that the glory was taken by the Romans. About that, Al-Tabari has mentioned that Ardashir claimed and announced that he had risen to take the revenge of Darius III, who had been defeated and killed by Alexander III of Macedon. Roman historians like Herodian and Cassius Dio have also mentioned reports about "the Sasanians' desire to return to the magnificence and kingdom of the Achaemenids"; these reports of Roman historians show that the Romans had understood the goals of the Sasanian foreign policy well; though they did not have a decent understanding of the change and transformation in the royal Iranian continuum. The place of Alexander, who was known as a nemesis of Iran, in the thought of the Sasanians' desire for return at the time was simultaneous and aligned with the idea of "following and honoring Alexander" in the Roman emperors; Caracalla called himself "the second Alexander" and "Severus Alexander" honored him. Kettenhofen, Robin and Heuse believe that the class of Greek-Roman sources that have reported the Sasanians' familiarity with the Achaemenids and their desire for return to and extension of the Achaemenid lands had propagative applications and should be interpreted in the frame of the Roman empire thoughts. But what is clear is Ardashir's and later his son Shapur's claim of Roman lands. Daryee believes that the cause of Ardashir and Shapur's wars with Rome was to accommodate their territorial ideals with traditions; he believes that the Sasanians' claim of Asian lands as their fathers' legacy had a mythical basis and originated from the mythical story of Fereydun dividing the world between his sons (Salm, Tur and Iraj); in that myth, Fereydun grants the reign of Turan to Tur and Rome to Salm and Iran, which is the best land in the world, to Iraj; the brothers become envious of the latter and the world goes under war. Thus, the Sasanians considered themselves Iraj's children and the Romans Salm's heirs by a mythical view. Daryee adds that only by that way the Sasanians' territorial claims, which are mentioned in Cassius Dio and Herodian's works, can be understood. He believes that the Sasanians' territorial claims were basically different from those of the Achaemenids.

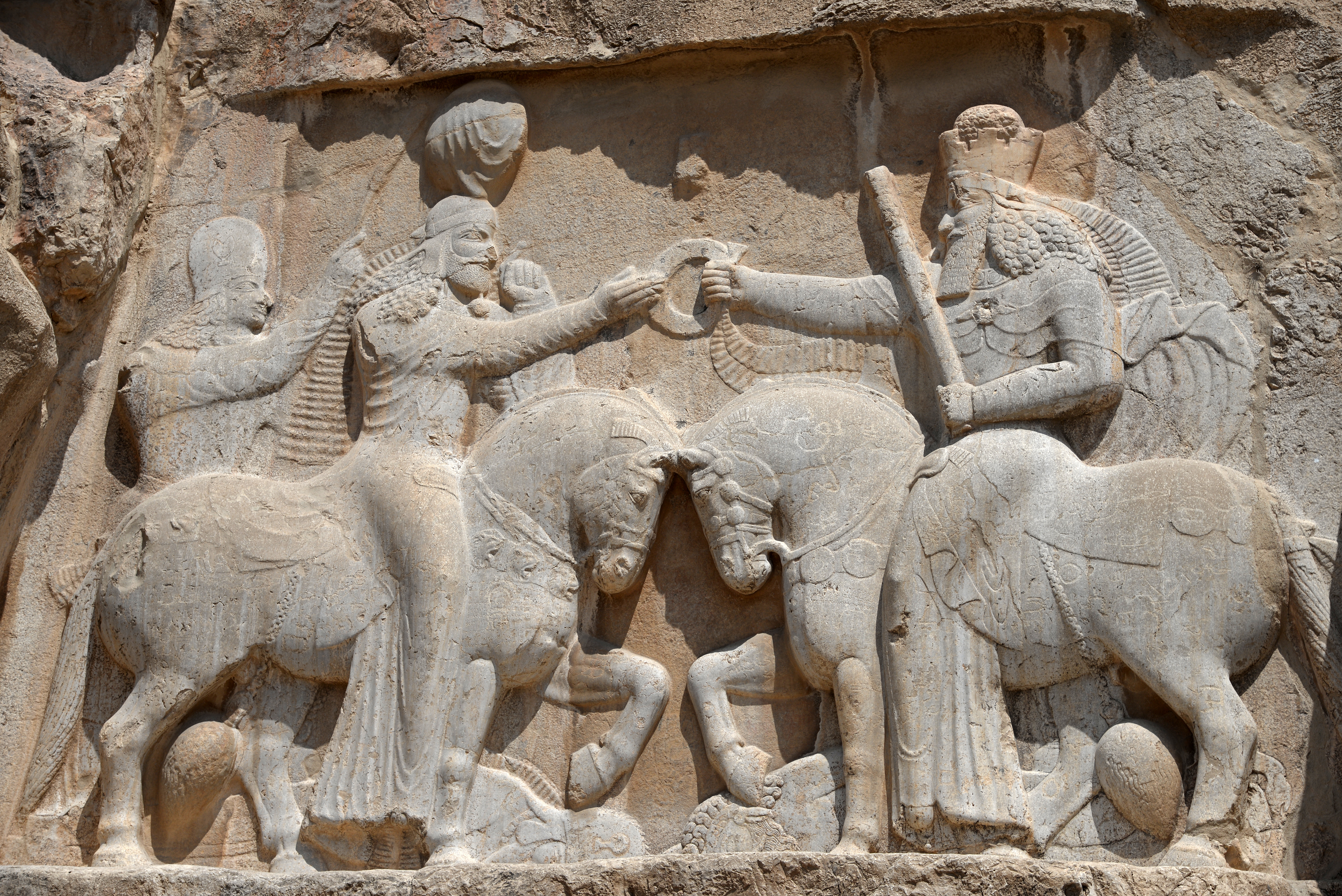
The third carving of "coronation" and the fourth carving of Ahura Mazda by Ardashir, carved in Naqsh-e Rustam. Ardashir and Ahura Mazda on horsebacks in front of each other, with the corpses of Artabanus and Ahriman under the nails of their horses, and Ardashir taking the ring of reign from Ahura Mazda

In the Sasanians' legendary genealogy that has appeared in Kar-Namag i Ardashir i Pabagan, the relation between the Sasanians and the Achaemenids is mentioned. In the book, the thought that has been reflected is the relation of Sasan, the ancestor of the Sasanian house, with Darius's descendants on one hand and the local Persian kings on the other hand; though in the fifth century, the Sasanians attributed their lineage to the mythical kings of Avesta or Kayanians; and its proof is the addition of the prefix "Kay" to the aliases of the Sasanian shahanshahs.

The question whether those claims and schemes and avengings, in the same way as mentioned in the historical sources, were actually proposed by Ardashir himself or were later attributed to him as the founder of the empire has still remained without answer due to the lack of sufficient sources; though the attribution of these claims to Ardashir after his lifetime seems more logical. According to these, it is undoubtedly true that Ardashir's grandiose views about policy and relations with the outside world had formed based on rebooting and repeating the Achaemenids' successes. However, the Sasanians' knowledge of the Achaemenids were superficial and vague information and did not have a regular and historical basis. About that, Richard Frye and Daryee believe that the section of the Arabic-Persian sources (like Al-Tabari) that contain the Sasanian history since the beginning until the age of Khosrow I should be looked at suspiciously; they consider this suspicious look at texts like Kar-Namag i Ardashir i Pabagan too. The suspicious look has been due to that most of the Iranian history sources were edited in the age of Khosrow I and by the royal writers and clerics in order to accommodate their predecessors' history with then world view of the Sasanian empire and draw a picture of Ardashir idealistic and aligning with Khosrow's ideals in the best way.

=== Religious policy ===
In the Meadows of Gold, Al-Masudi has mentioned Ardashir's preach to his son Shapur about the combination of religion and reign this way: "... Remember that religion and reign are bonding brothers and religion does not last without the throne; and reign does not remain without religion. Religion is the basis of reign and reign is the column of religion."

Papak was the grand priest of the temple of Anahita in Istakhr and the father of Ardashir, the founder of the Sasanian house, with the beginning of whose reign religion sat on the Persian throne. Papak's religious credit might have helped him in taking the power from Gochihr, then Persian governor who had no interest in following the religion of fire. In a scratched picture, Papak and his son Shapur are shown on a wall in Takht-e Jamshid; in the picture, Papak and Shapur both wear the same helmet similar to that of Shapur I's in his coins; in the picture, Shapur is visualized in the dual place of shah-priest in a way that he squeezes the hilt of his sword by one hand and manipulates the fire in the fireplace and adds woods by the other hand; and Shapur, son of Papak, squeezes his sword by one hand and takes a ring having a ribbon which is the royal symbol by the other hand on horseback. In his coins, Ardashir, who replaces his brother Shapur as the ruler of Pars in 220, wears the same crown as Shapur's, from the front however, and the picture of his father Papak is drawn behind. Zoroastrianism was the believed and supported religion of the Sasanians until Ardashir's takeover. The current belief is that the priests of the fire temples became noticed and respected by Ardashir's uprising and the opponents were disturbed; but this narrative is the subject of controversy today. Although no remarkable authority of Zoroastrianism had a high rank in Ardashir's court, it seems that the first attempts to establish Zoroastrianism as a government religion was done during Ardashir's period; also the remaining Achaemenid, Hellenic and Parthian traditions were combined and used in that era. Ardašhir demolished the dynastic sanctuaries of all the vassal kings, permitting only those established with his approval and that honored his dynasty. Accordingly, in Arsacid Armenia, Ardašhir expanded the temple cults and commanded that the fire of Ohrmazd, which burned on the altar at Bagavan, be kept alight forever. However, he destroyed the statues that Valarsace had erected as representations of his ancestors, along with those of the sun and moon at Armavir. These statues, which had been moved from Armavir to Bagaran and then to Artashat, were also broken by Ardašhir.

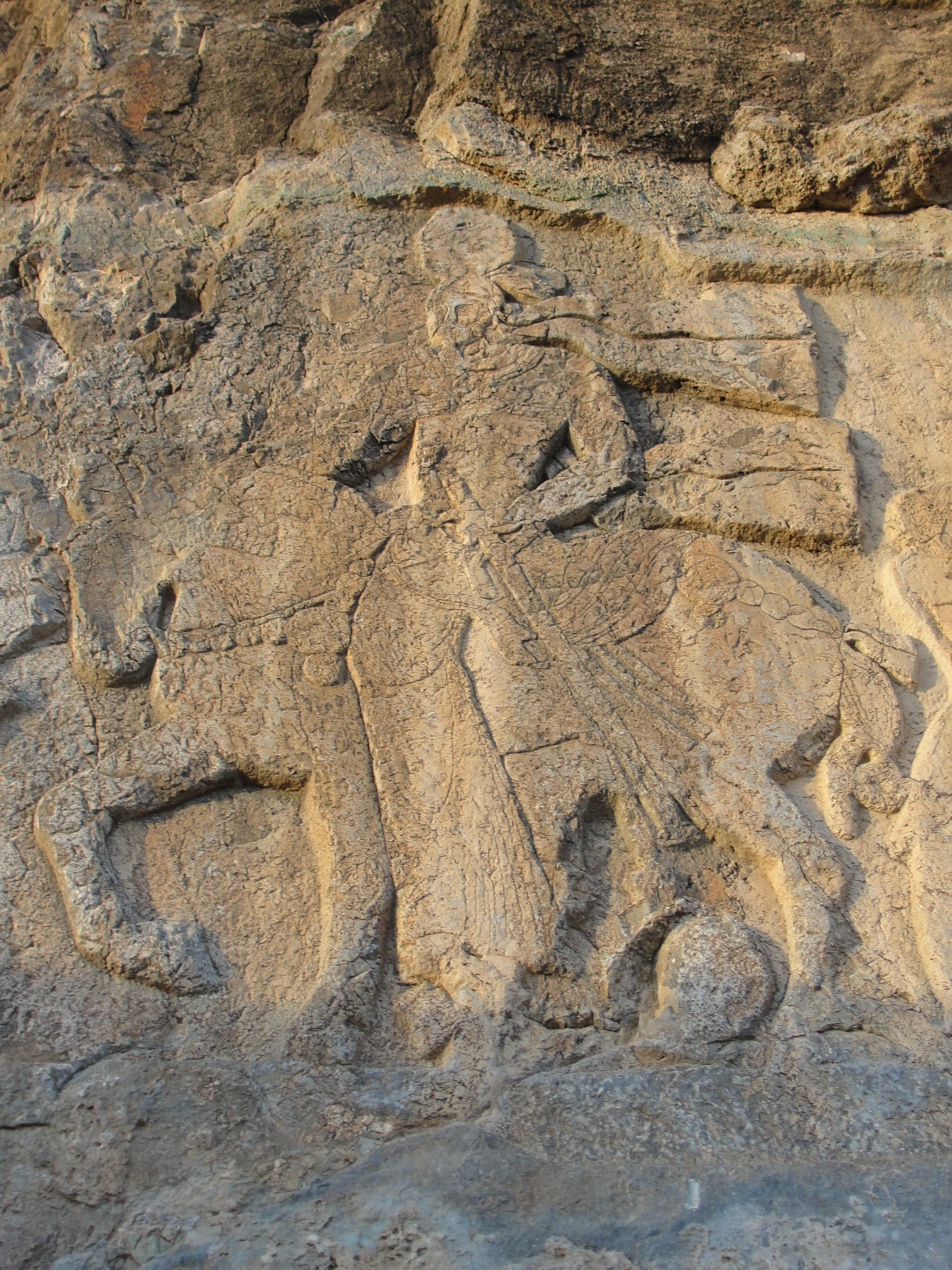
The fourth carving of "coronation" and the fifth carving of Ardashir in Khan-Takhti, Salmas

In his coins and inscription in Naqsh-e Rustam, Ardashir has called himself the worshiper of Ahura Mazda and from the line of gods. In Ardashir's subsequent coins, the dentate crown has replaced the traditional hat on his head; that change along with the addition of the phrase "...looks similar to the gods" (he is from the line of gods) claim Ardashir's divine place. That dentate crown looks like the same crown that is drawn on the head of Ahura Mazda in the carvings of the coronation in Naqsh-e Rustam and it is not known whether Ahura Mazda's crown is adapted from Ardashir's or vice versa. His beliefs are revealed behind his coins by visualizing the fire temple. His projecting pictures in Firuzabad, Naqsh-e Rustam and Naqsh-e Rajab have shown him close to Ahura Mazda. The latter's attention towards Ardashir has been known as khvarenah due to the mythical Iranian thoughts and it can be compared to the Greek "tuxeh" and the Roman "fortuna". Ardashir's khvarenah status shows the legitimacy of his reign. Founding the fire temples and giving budget to them along with considering Zoroastrian religious texts was another way for Ardashir to gain legitimacy. A special fire temple called "Ardashir's Fire" was founded in the beginning of his reign that is named in his inscriptions in Bishapur. In the Meadows of Gold, Al-Masudi has attributed some words to him:

Remember that religion and reign are two brothers that one can not exist without the other; because religion is the basis of reign and reign is the supporter of religion. Whatsoever does not stand on a basis will be doomed and whatever does not have a supporter will deteriorate.

Ardashir's policy against non-Mazda worshiping societies inside his kingdom had made it a difficult period for them. The Jews and believers in some other religions were more or less tolerated in the Parthian era and also had limited independence. Ardashir and his son Shapur, especially in the beginning of his reign, tried to limit the Jews' autonomy and deprive them of their independent judiciary and legal rights. The purpose of those actions might have been to extend the Zoroastrian society. The Syriac-language Christians were treated with more tolerance and leniency and their population increased until mid-third century. Mani did not reveal his message until Ardashir's death; he might have realized that Shapur was more convincing than his father.

=== Court and government posts ===
The rankings of the figures in Ardashir's court is found from Shapur I's inscription at the Ka'ba-ye Zartosht. Thus, the first four shahs are mentioned as Satarop Shah Abarinag (Abarineh: higher (lands), Nishapur, Khorasan), Ardashir the Shah of Merv, Ardashir the Shah of Kerman, Ardashir the Shah of Sekan (Sakastan), having the right of inherited succession in their family. After that, the name of three queens Denag Bazrangi, Ardashir's grandmother, Rodag, Ardashir's mother, and Denag Babakan, Ardashir's sister and wife are mentioned. Then, the names of "Ardashir Bidakhsh" and "Papak Hazarbed" and the five members of the great houses, called "Dihin" from the House of Veraz, Sasan from the House of Suren, Sasan-e Andigan-e Khoday va Piruz and Goug from the House of Karen along with "Abarsam-e Farardashir", who was probably the senior advisor are mentioned. Afterward, the names of fifteen remarkable characters like "Spahbed", "Dabiroft", Ayundbad (Director of Ceremonies), Framadar and his clerks and religious authorities like Herbad and Mubed and Mogh are mentioned. According to the inscription, the high posts of wuzurg framadar, priest of priests and Herbadan Herbad were not yet established in Ardashir's period.

It can be deduced from the list that some deviations have occurred in the important names and events of the era in the late Sasanian sources. For example, in the narrative Iranian history, the land that was ruled by "Mihrak Andigan" was named "the largest enemies of Ardashir"; while the mentioned region was under the rule of Sasan Shah Andigan and is mentioned as one of the pro-Ardashir regions in the mentioned inscription. It can be deduced from the list that a same-story group had appeared supporting Ardashir that included the representatives of large Iranian houses like the Varazes, Surens and Karens in addition to the shahs of Andigan and Opernak and Merv and Sakastan. According to Roman sources, some of the minor Mesopotamian governors had also joined them.

== Ardashir in the narrative-mythical Iranian history ==
In the narrative Iranian history, Ardashir is described as a heroic, bold, forethoughtful man with a high amount of fortitude and mood. According to those texts, he was a persistent man and had a chivalric behavior though he applied much violence and cruelty, and fought alongside his warriors in battles. In the narrative Iranian history texts, Ardashir succeeded because he was from the line of the ancient Iranian shahanshahs and was chosen by the gods to rule Iran. But there is no doubt in that justifying the Sasanian rule occurred by adding some matters to the real trend of the events of the era later and at the end of their reign and it probably had a political reason to mention those matters in official writings.

In the Letter of Tansar, it is mentioned that Ardashir's intention was to seek the revenge of Darius III from the Alexandrians (Romans). That text was obviously written in order to arouse the Iranians national emotions; though these narratives have more actually the criteria of epic stories. But it reveals the psychological truth that the Iranians deeply had the feeling of possessing a national identity for several centuries and considered themselves separate from other peoples; and that is why the other lands that the Iranians conquered were never named "Iran", but were called "Aniran".

== Ardashir's petroglyphs ==
The Sasanians' petroglyphic art was established by Ardashir and lived on until Shapur II's reign. The art was revived in Khosrow II's period. Ardashir's petroglyphs are clearly different from the few remaining Parthian samples and a new historic frame is seen in them. His first three petroglyphs have various styles, but do not show a clear evolutionary procedure. Only the fourth petroglyph, the picture of Ardashir's coronation in Naqsh-e Rustam, possesses clear features that reappears in the petroglyphs of Shapur I and his successors.

== Numismatics ==
The coins minted in Ardashir's period are divided into three general groups based on the applied designs:

The first group is the coins that show a full-face portrait of Ardashir on the coin and a profile of Papak, Ardashir's father who looks left due to the Parthians, behind the coin. The phrase "Ardashir Shah" is written on these coins with the phrase "His Majesty Papak Shah" behind.

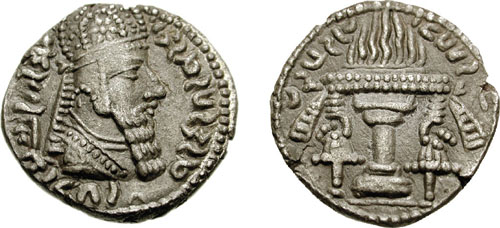
The picture of one of Ardashir's second group coins; Ardashir I's portrait on the coin and the symbol of firebox behind it

The second group have the profile of Ardashir wearing a hat or crown looking right similar to other coins of the Sasanian era. Behind the second group coins, a symbol of the firebox of the fire temple is seen like in all the coins of the Sasanian era. On the second group of the coins, the phrase "The worshiper of Mazda, his majesty Ardashir the Iranian shahanshah who has his face from the gods" is written that shows Ardashir's religious beliefes.

On the third group of the coins, the picture of Ardashir is carved in front of the picture of his son, Shapur, with the phrases "Shapur the Iranian shah who has his face from the gods" and "Ardashir's fire". The firebox of the fire temple is carved behind the coins.

The symbol behind the second group coins is a fireplace carving based on a design found in Persia and the phrase "Ardashir's fire" implies a royal fire that was ignited in the beginning of every shah's reign. The section of the supporting basis of the fireplace has some similarity to the Achaemenid throne. Some hanging bands are carved in the end of an open headband, which is the royal symbol in Persian traditions. Therefore, the petroglyphs behind these coins show Ardashir's concern for showing himself not only as the Achaemenids' rightful heir, but also as a religious Zoroastrian. In the makeup of head and hair, Ardashir was loyal to the Parthian traditions in the first coins and chose a crown similar to the crowns of Mithridates II's period. However, in the final years, Ardashir's main crown was from a type in which a part of the hair was decorated in a globe above the head; the globe and the lid were covered with a thin silky net and some bands were hanging behind it.

Based on a research by Callieri, most of the symbols of the Frataraka's coins like the flag, the memorial building and the appearing posture of the person standing opposite to it are derived from the Achaemenids. Daryaee believes that though the Fratarakas probably did not know the proper application of a building like Ka'ba-ye Zartosht, it still had an ideological importance to them. Therefore, it can be deduced from the similarity of Ardashir's coins with the late coins of local Persian governors there was a movement based on Persian traditions and the local Persian governors' adornment of it. However that does not necessarily mean that Ardashir was related to the local Persian shahs in all affairs.

== Legacy ==
Among the Sasanian shahs, two, Ardashir I and Khosrow I, are attributed preaches and scholarly words more than other shahs and these works are quoted of them in most of Arabic literature and history books and by them in Persian ethics and history books. One of the most important works attributed to Ardashir is his "testament".

=== Ardashir's Testament ===
Ardashir's Testament is a book including Ardashir's political advice to the Iranian shahs who rose after him and he had mentioned lectures in it that he believed were necessary to be applied in running the kingdom.

Ibn al-Nadim once mentioned a book called Ardashir's Testament that Al-Baladhuri (died 279 Hijri), one of Persian (Middle) translators, had turned into an Arabic poem. Once again in the chapter about the books of the Persians, Romans, Indians and Arabs in the preaches and ethics and doctrines, he mentioned a book called Ardashir I's Testament to His Son Shapur and it seems that he meant another book.

The original Middle Persian text of Ardashir's Testament is lost; but some versions of its Arabic translations are available:

1. The text that is written in the book Al-Ghorreh that was probably written in the second half of the fourth century and its author is not known. That version was rewritten in 584 Hijri.
2. The text that is written in Miskawayh's Tajarob-ol Omam.
3. The text that is written in a series belonging to the Kuperolo Library (No. 1608) and was probably rewritten from a sixth-century version in the early eleventh century.
4. The text written by Abi.

In addition to the complete text, there is an abridged version of it titled Montakhab men Ahd-e Ardashir bin Babak available.

In the Islamic era, Ardashir's Testament is mentioned in many history and literature books. Al-Masudi has remarked it and has quoted a phrase of its about the last millennium. It is also named in Mojmal al-tawarikh and Farsnameh and in the latter it is mentioned about Khosrow I that "he suggested the testaments of Ardashir, son of Papak, and applied his preaches that were in that testament." The same matter is mentioned by Al-Tabari and Al-Tha'alibi. Al-Jahiz has mentioned Ardashir's Testament along with Bozorgmehr's Quotes and mentions that the writers (Kottab) used it. Al-Mubarrad (died 286 Hijri) writes that Al-Ma'mun had ordered his son's mentor to teach him Al-Watheg bellah the book of God and read him Ardashir's Testament and force him to memorize Kelileh va Demneh.

=== Ardashir's Testament to His Son Shapur ===
Ibn al-Nadim names a book titled Ardashir I's Testament to His Son Shapur among the books of preaches and ethics and doctrines. That is probably the same short text that is written with the version title Ardashir's Testament to His Son Shapur in the book Nahayat-ol Aarab attributed to Al-Asma'i. Apparently, Ibn al-Muqaffa' or more probably the author of the Seir-ol Moluk that was the reference of Nahayat-ol Aarab chose the text from the Arabic translation of Ardashir's Testament and added some matters from other places to it. Ibn Qutaybah has written a matter from Ardashir intended to his son quoted from One of the Ajam Books that can be found in this testament.

=== Ardashir's Book on Government Principles ===
A book attributed to Ardashir about the bases of government is written in an Arabic translation in the book Nahayat-ol Aarab and the warriors (Asawereh), writers (Kottab), Judges (Gozat), invasion (Bo'uth va Thoghur), accepting ambassadors (Fi Godum-el Vofud alayhe men gabl-e Moluk) constructing cities (Bana-ol Modon), his strategy for noble houses (Tadbirohu fi Ahl-e Boyutat-el Sharaf), complaint (Mazalem) and development of lands (Tadbirohu Emarat-al Arzain) are discussed in it. The Persian translation of that book is written in the translation of Nahayat-ol Aarab called Tajarob-ol Omam and also in Ferdowsi's Shahnameh. It is not known whether the book is translated directly from Middle Persian or not. Grinaski believes that an Arabic-writing author had assembled it from different places. In order to prove his opinion, he mentions evidence that shows the influence of Islamic principles in it, for instance the writing in the book that one fifth of the war plunder is for the shah. However, since the text is written in Shahnameh, it probably existed in Khwaday-Namag too and some matters aligning with Islamic principles were added to it in the translation.

=== Ardashir-Khwarrah ===
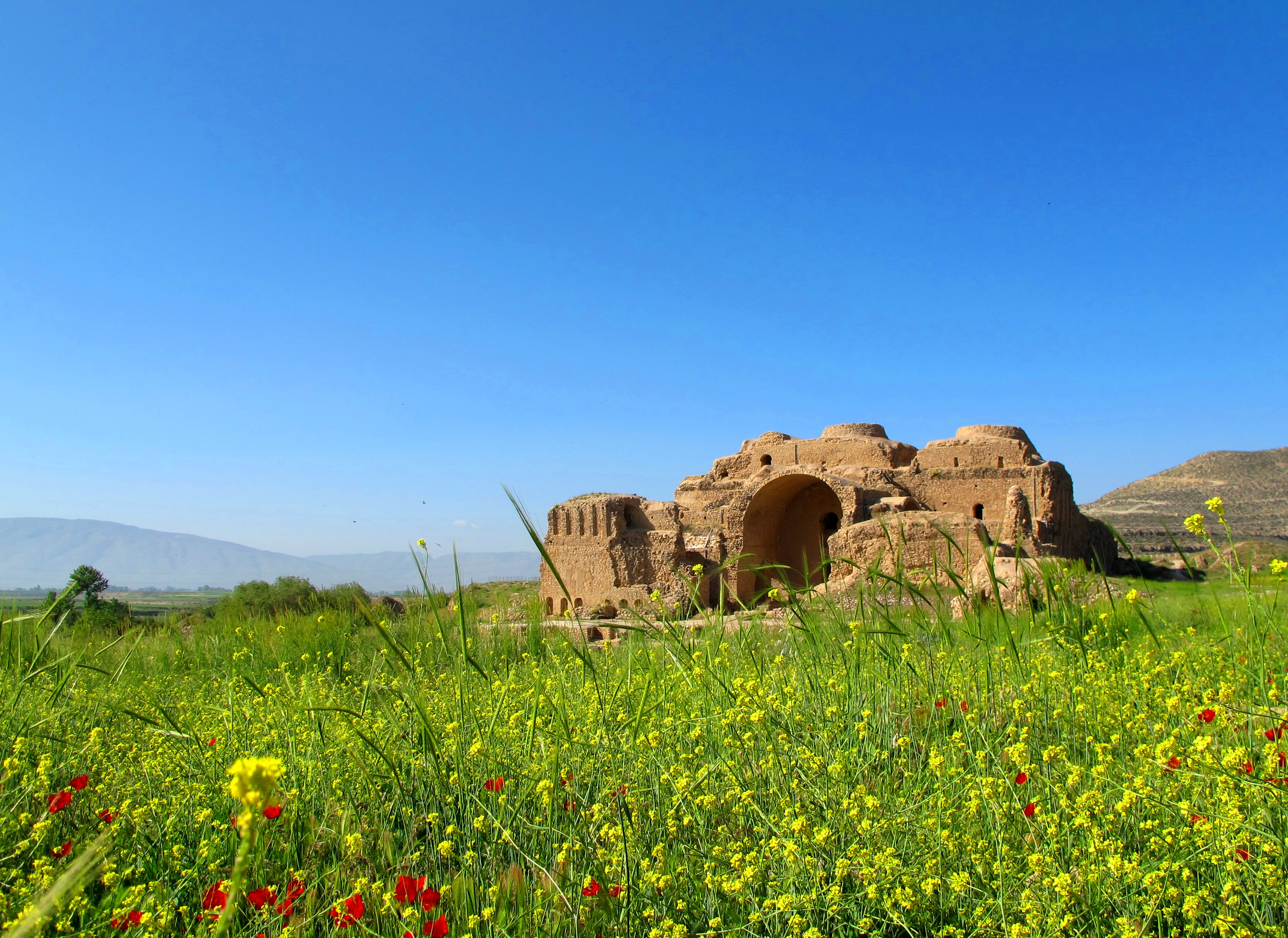
A view of the Palace of Ardashir, the city of Gur (current Firuzabad), the entrance hall and supporting halls of the palace were covered with wheel domes. The outside walls did not have windows, but did contain prominent and dome-like columns.

Ardashir-Khwarrah is one of the five Iranian villages in the Sasanian era until the first Islamic centuries centered by the city of Gur (Arabic: Jur) that were constructed by Ardashir. The name means "Ardashir's magnificence". The town was probably constructed after Ardashir's victory over Artabanus in 224. The town was constructed beside Ardashir's palace (where he lived before the rebellion) and it is said that the emperor built five fire temples beside the town that the historian, Al-Masudi had seen. The city of Gur was run by a representative from the shah. Gur was later renamed Firuzabad by the 10th-century Buyid king 'Adud al-Dawla. Ardashir-Khwarrah can be mentioned as a military base and one of the active mints of the Sasanian era. Of the works of Ardashir-Khwarrah, the building of Tarbal (Menar) Kiakhoreh beside the building of Chaharotag (The Gur fire temple), Ardashir's palace, the inscription of Mihr Narseh (the vizier of three Sasanian kings; Yazdegerd I, Bahram V and Yazdegerd II) and his four fire temples can be mentioned.

The structure of the town is inspired by the architectural method of Darabgard and contains circular walls that surround an area with a diameter of about two kilometers and a double muddy wall and a trench with a Parthian style and two axes divide the perpendicular intersection of the city to four sectors with four main gates of Mehr, Bahram, Hormoz and Ardashir that each is divided to five smaller sections that are connected to each other by ring-like streets.

== See also ==
- Inscription of Ardashir-e Babakan and Hormozd
- Sassanid campaign of Severus Alexander
- Mesopotamian campaigns of Ardashir I

== Sources ==
- Christensen, A. (2005). "Sassanid Persia". In Bowman, Alan K.; Cameron, Averil; Garnsey, Peter (eds.). The Cambridge Ancient History, Volume XII: The Crisis of Empire, A.D. 193-337. Cambridge: Cambridge University Press. pp. 109–111, 118, 120, 126–130. ISBN 978-0-5213-0199-2.
- Oranskij, I. M. 1977: Les Langues Iraniennes. Paris: Librairie C. Klincksieck, pp. 71–76. ISBN 2252019913.

Ardashir I Sasanian dynasty Died: February 242
New title	King of Kings of Iran; 224–242	Succeeded by Shapur I
