= Denag (sister of Ardashir I) =

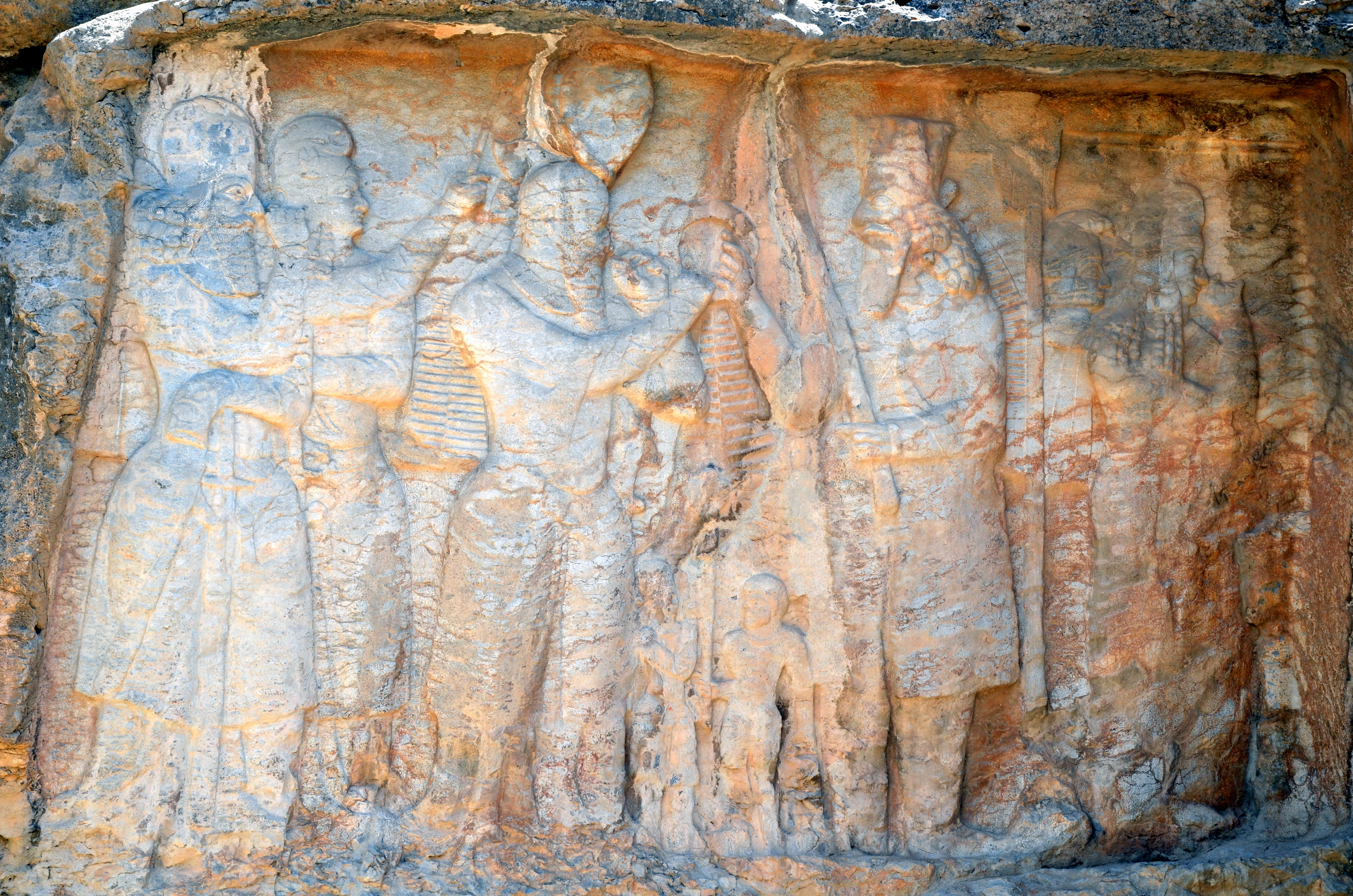
Investiture relief of Ardashir I at Naqsh-e Rajab, with Denag possibly representing the figure on the far right

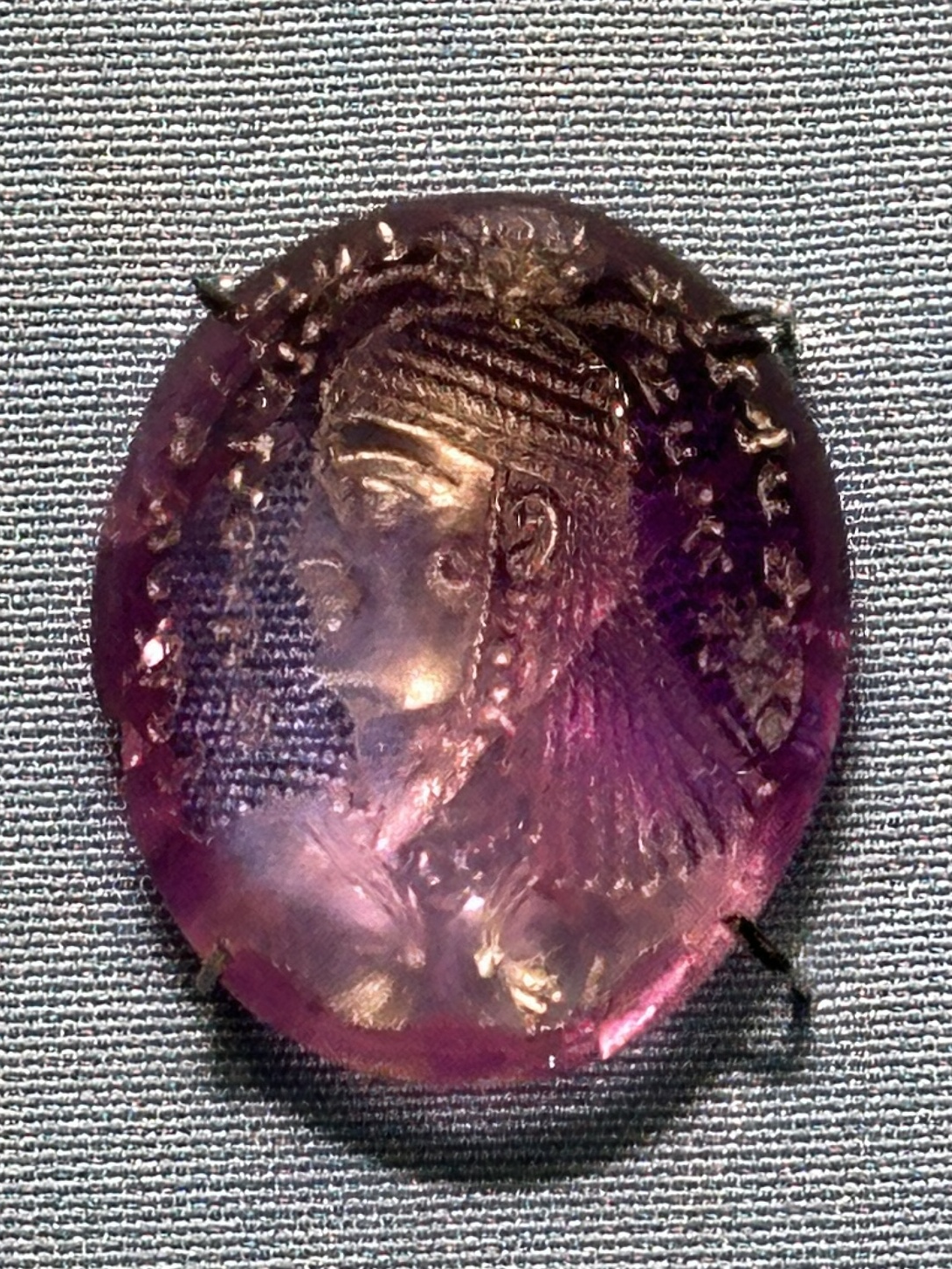
Seal of Queen Denag

Denag (Middle Persian: Dēnag) was a 3rd-century Sasanian queen (banbishn), who was the sister-wife of the Sasanian king (shah) Ardashir I (r. 224–242).

== Biography ==
She was one of the daughters of Pabag, a local ruler in Pars; her brothers were Shapur, Ardashir I, and Balash. She later became the wife of Ardashir I in accordance with the Zoroastrian law of consanguine marriage. She was thus given the title of bānbishnān bānbishn ("Queen of Queens") and is assumed to have been represented the figure on the far right of the investiture relief of Ardashir at Naqsh-e Rajab. She later lost her title of bānbishnān bānbishn after the death of her husband in 242.

== Sources ==
- Gignoux, Philippe (1994). "Dēnag". In Yarshater, Ehsan (ed.). Encyclopædia Iranica. Vol. VII/3: Dehqān I–Deylam, John of. London and New York: Routledge & Kegan Paul. p. 282. ISBN 978-1-56859-021-9.
