= Rodag =

Rodag or Rodak (Middle Persian: Rōdak, New Persian: رودک) was a 3rd-century Sasanian noblewoman, the wife of Pabag and the mother of Ardashir I (r. 224–242), the founder of the Sasanian Empire. She is mentioned in the inscription of Shapur I on the wall of the Ka'ba-ye Zartosht at Naqsh-e Rostam near Persepolis in southern Iran as “Mother of the King of Kings”.

She was an Iranian woman who lived during the start of the Sasanian period. She played a significant and direct role in the formation of the Sasanian dynasty. Her husband, Pāpak, was a leader at the Anahita temple in Istakhr. By her old age, she was able to attend her son’s coronation ceremony.

== Sources ==
- Brosius, Maria (2000). "WOMEN i. In Pre-Islamic Persia". Encyclopaedia Iranica, Vol. London et al.
- Wiesehöfer, J. (1986). "ARDAŠĪR I i. History". In Yarshater, Ehsan (ed.). Encyclopædia Iranica. Vol. II/4: Architecture IV–Armenia and Iran IV. London and New York: Routledge & Kegan Paul. pp. 371–376. ISBN 978-0-71009-104-8.
