= Shadh-Shapur =

Shadh-Shapur was an Iranian king who ruled Spahan and its surroundings as a vassal of the Parthian Empire in the early 3rd-century. In 224, the Sasanian king Ardashir I seized the city and killed him.

== Sources ==
- Hansman, J. (2006). "ISFAHAN iv. PRE-ISLAMIC PERIOD". Encyclopaedia Iranica, Vol. XIII, Fasc. 6. pp. 635–638.
- Al-Tabari, Abu Ja'far Muhammad ibn Jarir (1985–2007). Ehsan Yar-Shater (ed.). The History of Al-Ṭabarī. Vol. 40 vols. Albany, NY: State University of New York Press.
