= Ardashir (king of Marv) =

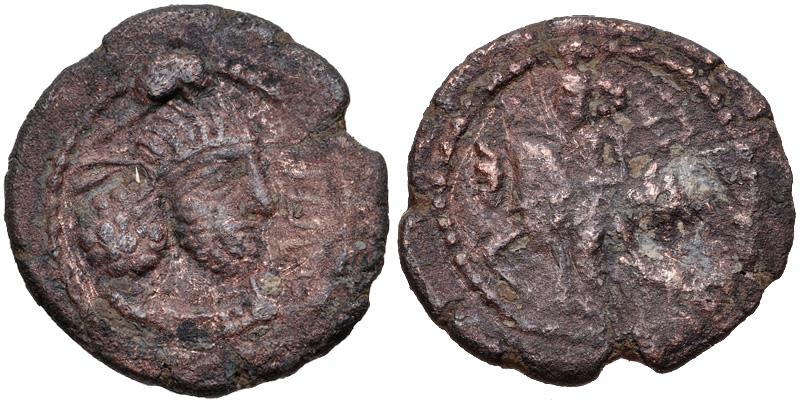
Coin of Ardashir

Ardashir (Middle Persian: ) was a Sasanian prince, who ruled Marv from ca. 240 to 262. He was either a brother or son of the Sasanian king Ardashir I (r. 224-242), who had installed him as the ruler of Marv, which was the outpost of his empire in the north-east.

== Sources ==
- Frye, R. N. (1984). The History of Ancient Iran. C.H.Beck. pp. 1–411. ISBN 9783406093975. "The history of ancient iran."
- Frye, R. N. (1993). "The Political History of Iran under the Sasanians". In Bayne Fisher, William; Gershevitch, Ilya; Yarshater, Ehsan; Frye, R. N.; Boyle, J. A.; Jackson, Peter; Lockhart, Laurence; Avery, Peter; Hambly, Gavin; Melville, Charles (eds.). The Cambridge History of Iran. Cambridge University Press. ISBN 0-521-20092-X.
