= Pusdil =

Sasanian prince (died 628)

Pusdil was a Sasanian prince—he was the son of Khosrow II (r. 590-628), and together with most of his brothers and half-brothers were executed in 628 by Kavadh II (r. 628), another son of Khosrow II. According to the Iranian historian al-Tabari, Pusdil and the rest of his executed brothers and half-brothers were "all well-educated, valiant, and chivalrous men".

== Sources ==
- Shapur Shahbazi, A. (2005). "SASANIAN DYNASTY". Encyclopaedia Iranica, Online Edition.
