= Shahrvaraz Jadhuyih =

Sasanian military officer

Shahrvaraz Jadhuyih (Persian: شهربراز جادویه) was a Sasanian military officer from the Mihran family. He was related to Shahrbaraz, the Sasanian spahbed and briefly shahanshah. He participated in the battle of Isfahan along with Fadhusfan and another Persian general against the Islamic Arabs. He was, however, defeated and killed during the battle.

== Sources ==
- Pourshariati, Parvaneh (2008). Decline and Fall of the Sasanian Empire: The Sasanian-Parthian Confederacy and the Arab Conquest of Iran. London and New York: I.B. Tauris. ISBN 978-1-84511-645-3.
