= Turan (Baluchistan) =

Medieval name for the district around Khuzdar, Baluchistan

Turan (Urdu: توران), the medieval Islamic name for the district around Khuzdar, south of modern Quetta, in the east-central part of what is now Baluchistan, the territory in British Indian times of the Khanate of Kalat.

Tabari, Istakhri and Ibn Hawqal mentioned Turan in their history books.
