= Sasan =

Early 3rd century ancestor of the Sasanian dynasty

- Zoroastrian High Priest

Founder of the Sasanian Empire
- Reign: 3rd century
- Issue: Ardashir I
Names
- Sasan
- Dynasty: Sasanian Dynasty
- Religion: Zoroastrianism

Sasan (Middle Persian 𐭮𐭠𐭮𐭠𐭭 Sāsān > Persian ساسان), considered the eponymous ancestor of the Sasanian (or Sassanid) Dynasty (ruled 224–651) in Persia, was "a great warrior and hunter" and a Zoroastrian high priest in Pars. He lived sometime near the fall of the Arsacid (Parthian) Empire in the early 3rd century.

== Identity of Sasan ==
=== Medieval sources ===
There are many slightly different stories concerning Sasan and his relation to Ardashir I, the founder of the Sasanian Empire. The northern Iranian historian Tabari mentions that Sasan married Rambehesht, a princess of the Bāzarangid family, the vassal dynasty of Pārs, and that Sasan was a grandfather of Ardashir I, while Papak is named as Ardashir I's father.

According to the Pahlavi book of Karnamak-i Artaxshir-i Papakan, Sasan's wife was a daughter of a nobleman called Papak. The marriage was arranged by Papak after hearing that Sasan has "Achamenian (Achaemenid) blood in him". Their son was Ardashir I. Sasan vanishes shortly after Ardashir appears in the story and Papak is "considered the father of Ardashir".

Al-Masudi wrote that Sasan's mother was a Jewish woman, descended from the Israelites who had lived in the area from the time of the Babylonian captivity.

These stories on different relations between Ardashir, Pāpak, and Sāsān have, according to Frye, a Zoroastrian explanation. Sasan was indeed the father of Ardashir and "disappears" from the story after the birth of Ardashir. Similar to the current Zoroastrian practices, Papak had then taken the responsibility of his daughter and her son Ardashir after Sasan "disappears" and is named afterwards as the father of Ardashir.

In the Kabe Zartosht inscription of Shapur I the Great, the four named persons "Sasan, Papak, Ardashir, Shapur" have different titles: Sasan is named as hwataw or xwadāy ("the lord", usually given to sovereigns of small local principalities), Papak as shah, Ardashir as shāhanshāh ("King of Kings of the Sasanian Empire") and Shapur as "King of Kings of Iran and Aniran".

=== Modern sources ===
However, according to Touraj Daryaee, Sasanian sources cannot be trusted because they were from the royal Sasanian archives, which were made by the court, in the words of Daryaee, "to fit the world-view of the late Sasanian world". Daryaee and several other scholars state that Sasan had his name from a deity who was known in many parts of Asia but not in Fars, the homeland of the Sasanians, which thus means that Sasan was an Iranian foreigner from the west or the east who had settled in Fars, whose inhabitants did not know about this deity he believed in. However, a newly discovered pre-Sasanian Middle Persian inscription from Persis attests to the name Sāsān in the region before the rise of the Sasanian dynasty.

Sasan later managed to become the priest of the important Anahid temple in Estakhr, the capital of Fars. According to the Bundahishn, which according to Daryaee was made independently and not by the Sasanian court, Sasan's daughter later married Papak and bore him Ardashir. Furthermore, the Bundahishn states that Sasan was the son of a certain Weh-afrid.

== Politics of the Sasanian family ==
The political ambition of Sasan was evoked by the troubles and weakness of the last years of the Parthian Empire. According to Tabari, Papak managed to consolidate his power with the help of his own sons Shapur and Ardashir. This is considered the beginning of the Sasanian dynasty.

Sasan's family became the rulers of the second Persian Empire and ruled over a great portion of western Asia (the first Persian Empire having been ruled by the dynasty of Cyrus the Great). The three founders of this new empire – that is, Papak and his two sons – are depicted and mentioned on the wall of the harem of Xerxes at Persepolis, a remnant site of the Achaemenids, a representation suggested to be the evidence of a claim to Achaemenid heritage likely later added.

Sasan is known for his efforts to try to bring Zoroastrianism back into the empire. He even encouraged Papak to take over the Parthian satrapy of Pars.

== See also ==
- List of shahanshahs of the Sasanian Empire
- Sasanian Empire

== Bibliography ==
- Daryaee, Touraj (2010), "Ardashir and the Sasanians' Rise to Power" (PDF), Anabasis: Studia Classica et Orientalia, vol. 1, archived from the original (PDF) on 4 March 2016
- Frye, Richard N. (1983). "The political history of Iran under the Sasanians". In Yarshater, Ehsan (ed.). The Cambridge History of Iran. Vol. 3. Cambridge University Press. ISBN 978-0-521-20092-9.
- Kohl, Philip L.; Kozelsky, Mara; Ben-Yehuda, Nachman (2008), Selective Remembrances: Archaeology in the Construction, Commemoration, and Consecration of National Pasts, University of Chicago Press, ISBN 9780226450643
- Shahbazi, Alireza Shapour (2005), "Sassanian Dynasty", Encyclopedia Iranica, Columbia University Press
