= Khwasak =

Satrap of Susa under the Parthian king Artabanus IV

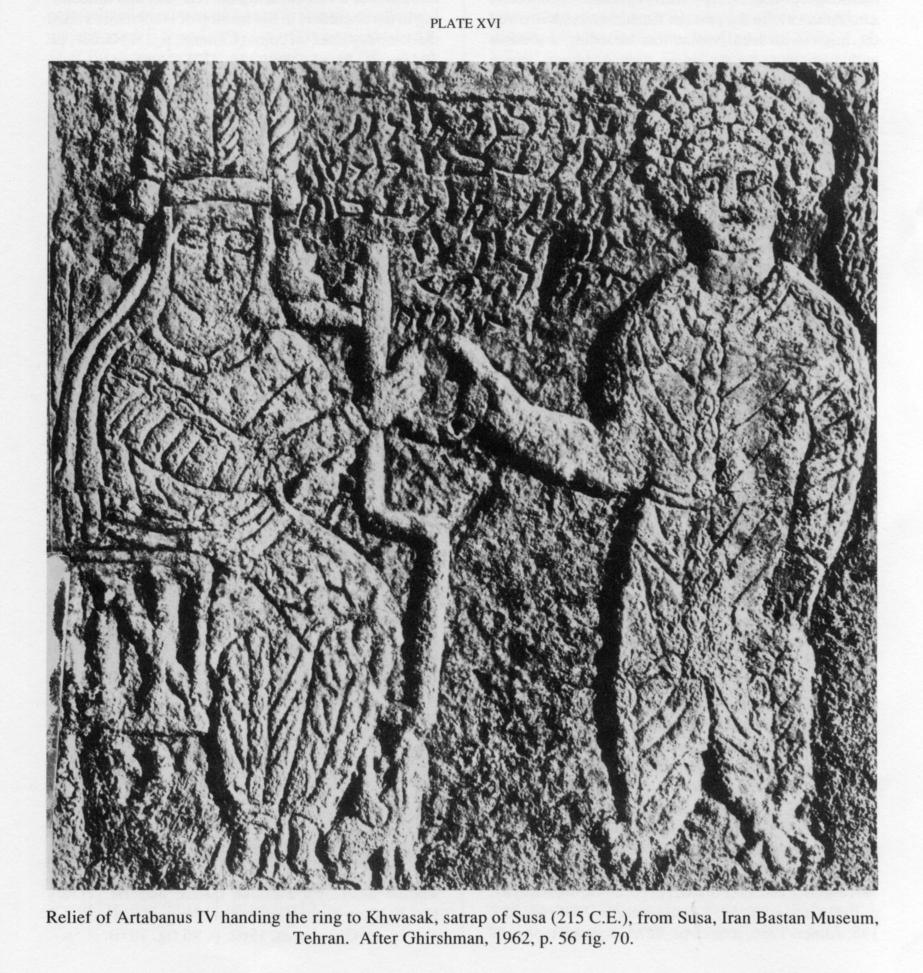
- Relief of Artabanus IV of Parthia and the satrap Khwasak at Susa
- Occupation: Satrap
- Years active: Early 3rd century AD
- Known for: Satrap of Susa under Parthian king Artabanus IV
- Title: Satrap of Susa

Khwasak (Parthian: 𐭇𐭅𐭎𐭊, romanized: ḥwsk) was at the beginning of the 3rd century AD, the Satrap of Susa under the Parthian king Artabanus IV.

Khwasak is known from a stela found at Susa. The function of the stela is unknown but it might have been a tomb stone. The stela shows Khwasak and the king, who is handing over the ring of power to Khwasak. The Parthian text informs us that the stela was set up in the year AD 215. Susa was most likely in the 2nd century more or less an independent state. The inscription on the stela demonstrates that the city became at the beginning of the 3rd century again part of the Parthian empire with Khwasak as governor under king Artabanus IV.

== Sources ==
- D. T. Potts: The Archaeology of Elam: Formation and Transformation of an Ancient Iranian State, Cambridge University Press, Cambridge, 1999, ISBN 0-521-56358-5; p. 401-402
