= Banu al-Munajjim =

Iranian family of Abbasid officials

The Banu al-Munajjim (Arabic: بنو المنجم), was an Iranian family of Abbasid officials attested in the 9th and 10th centuries. They claimed descent from the Sasanian dynasty.

== History ==
According to Ibn al-Nadim, the Banu al-Munajjim were descended from Mihr-Gushnasp, a son of the last Sasanian king Yazdegerd III (r. 632–651). The family is first mentioned in the 9th century, when the eponymous ancestor of the family, Abu Mansur al-Munajjim (originally named Aban-Gushnasp), worked at the court of the second Abbasid caliph, al-Mansur (r. 754–775) as an astrologer (al-munajjim). His son, Yahya, worked at the Abbasid court under al-Ma'mun (r. 813–833), and later converted from Zoroastrianism to Islam. Yahya had four sons named Ali, Sa'id, Abdallah, and Hasan. These four sons would, like their father, work at the Abbasid court. Ali even befriended the caliph al-Mutawakkil (r. 847–861), and his son Yahya did the same with al-Muwaffaq, the de facto regent for his brother al-Mu'tamid (r. 870–892). One of Ali's other sons, Harun, also worked at the Abbasid court. Harun had a son named Ali, who eventually served under the Buyids when they became the new rulers of Baghdad. He is the last known member of the family.

== Sources ==
- D. Pingree. "Banu Monajjem". Encyclopaedia Iranica. Ed. Ehsan Yarshater. Columbia University. Retrieved 14 February 2014.
- Karamati, Younes; Umar, Suheyl (2013). "Banū al-Munajjim". " Encyclopaedia Islamica. Leiden and New York: BRILL. ISBN 9789004246911.
