= Dehuiyeh =

Dehuiyeh or Dehuyeh or Dehueeyeh or Dehooeyeh or Dohuiyeh or Dehooyeh or Dahuiyeh or Dahooeyeh or Dehvieh (Persian: دهوييه) may refer to:

- Dehuyeh, Estahban, Fars Province
- Dehuiyeh, Khir, Estahban County, Fars Province
- Dehuyeh, Runiz, Estahban County, Fars Province
- Dehuiyeh, Firuzabad, Fars Province
- Dehuyeh, Neyriz, Fars Province
- Dehuiyeh, Kerman
- Dehuiyeh, Derakhtengan, Kerman County, Kerman Province
- Dehuiyeh, Golbaf, Kerman County, Kerman Province
- Dehuiyeh, Rafsanjan, Kerman Province
- Dehuiyeh, Koshkuiyeh, Rafsanjan County, Kerman Province
- Dahuiyeh, Ravar, Kerman Province
- Dehuiyeh, Shahr-e Babak, Kerman Province
- Dahuiyeh, Zarand, Kerman Province
