= Dehu (disambiguation) =

Dehu is a census town in Maharashtra, India.

Dehu (Persian: دهو) may also refer to:

- Dehu, Bushehr, a village in Bushehr Province, Iran
- Dehu, Fars, a village in Fars Province, Iran
- Dehu, Estahban, a village in Fars Province, Iran
- Dehu, Khir, a village in Estahban County, Fars Province, Iran
- Dehu, Hormozgan, a village in Hormozgan Province, Iran
- Dehu, Bam, a village in Kerman Province, Iran
- Dehu, Kerman, a village in Kerman Province, Iran
- Dehu, Meyghan, a village in South Khorasan Province, Iran
