= Aliabad-e Shams =

Aliabad-e Shams علي ابادشمس
- Village
- Location within Iran
- Coordinates: 29°10′13″N 53°40′12″E
- Country: Iran
- Province: Fars
- County: Estahban
- Bakhsh: Runiz
- Rural District: Runiz

Population (2006)
  - Total: 618
- Time zone: UTC+3:30 (IRST)
  - Summer (DST): UTC+4:30 (IRDT)

Aliabad-e Shams (Persian: علي ابادشمس, also Romanized as 'Alīābād-e Shams) is a village in Runiz Rural District, Runiz District, Estahban County, Fars province, Iran. At the 2006 census, its population was 618, in 144 families.
