= Ab Band, Iran =

Ab Band اب بند
- Village
- Location within Iran
- Coordinates: 28°53′31″N 54°23′02″E
- Country: Iran
- Province: Fars
- County: Estahban
- Bakhsh: Central
- Rural District: Ij

Population (2006)
  - Total: 217
- Time zone: UTC+3:30 (IRST)
  - Summer (DST): UTC+4:30 (IRDT)

Ab Band (Persian: اب بند, also Romanized as Āb Band) is a village in Ij Rural District, in the Central District of Estahban County, Fars province, Iran. At the 2006 census, its population was 217, in 52 families.
