= Darb-e Emamzadeh =

Darb-e Emamzadeh درب امامزاده
- Village
- Location within Iran
- Coordinates: 29°02′37″N 54°17′15″E
- Country: Iran
- Province: Fars
- County: Estahban
- Bakhsh: Central
- Rural District: Ij

Population (2006)
  - Total: 454
- Time zone: UTC+3:30 (IRST)
  - Summer (DST): UTC+4:30 (IRDT)

Darb-e Emamzadeh (Persian: درب امامزاده, also Romanized as Darb-e Emāmzādeh) is a village in Ij Rural District, in the Central District of Estahban County, Fars province, Iran. At the 2006 census, its population was 454, in 113 families.
