= Khaneh Ket =

Khaneh Ket خانه كت
- Village
- Location within Iran
- Coordinates: 29°26′47″N 53°38′07″E
- Country: Iran
- Province: Fars
- County: Estahban
- Bakhsh: Runiz
- Rural District: Khir

Population (2006)
  - Total: 1,108
- Time zone: UTC+3:30 (IRST)
  - Summer (DST): UTC+4:30 (IRDT)

Khaneh Ket (Persian: خانه كت, also Romanized as Khāneh Ket and Khaneh-i-Kat; also known as Khāneh Ket Baker, Khāneh Qasţ, and Khani Kat) is a village in Khir Rural District, Runiz District, Estahban County, Fars province, Iran. At the 2006 census, its population was 1,108, in 238 families.
