= Abbasabad, Estahban =

Abbasabad عباس آباد
- Village
- Location within Iran
- Coordinates: 29°10′22″N 53°41′52″E
- Country: Iran
- Province: Fars
- County: Estahban
- Bakhsh: Runiz
- Rural District: Runiz

Population (2016)
  - Total: 61
- Time zone: UTC+3:30 (IRST)

Abbasabad (Persian: عباس آباد, also Romanized as 'Abbāsābād) is a village in Runiz Rural District, Runiz District, Estahban County, Fars province, Iran. At the 2006 census, its population was 81, in 18 families. In 2016, it had 61 people in 20 households.
