= Kar Panbehi =

Kar Panbehi كرپنبه اي
- Village
- Location within Iran
- Coordinates: 29°06′41″N 53°54′59″E
- Country: Iran
- Province: Fars
- County: Estahban
- Bakhsh: Runiz
- Rural District: Runiz

Population (2006)
  - Total: 17
- Time zone: UTC+3:30 (IRST)
  - Summer (DST): UTC+4:30 (IRDT)

Kar Panbehi (Persian: كرپنبه اي, also Romanized as Kar Panbehī; also known as Kar Panbeh) is a village in Runiz Rural District, Runiz District, Estahban County, Fars province, Iran. At the 2006 census, its population was 17, in 4 families.
