= Damaneh, Fars =

Damaneh دامنه
- Village
- Location within Iran
- Coordinates: 29°13′39″N 53°53′24″E
- Country: Iran
- Province: Fars
- County: Estahban
- Bakhsh: Runiz
- Rural District: Khir

Population (2006)
  - Total: 479
- Time zone: UTC+3:30 (IRST)
  - Summer (DST): UTC+4:30 (IRDT)

Damaneh (Persian: دامنه, also Romanized as Dāmaneh; also known as Davāneh) is a village in Khir Rural District, Runiz District, Estahban County, Fars province, Iran. At the 2006 census, its population was 479, in 107 families.
