= Bagh-e Shad =

Bagh-e Shad باغ شاد
- Village
- Location within Iran
- Coordinates: 28°58′22″N 54°24′01″E
- Country: Iran
- Province: Fars
- County: Estahban
- Bakhsh: Central
- Rural District: Ij

Population (2006)
  - Total: 443
- Time zone: UTC+3:30 (IRST)
  - Summer (DST): UTC+4:30 (IRDT)

Bagh-e Shad (Persian: باغ شاد, Romanized as Bāgh-e Shād) is a village in Ij Rural District, in Central District of Estahban County, Fars province, Iran. At 2006 census, population was 443, in 97 families.
