= Khir =

Khir may refer to:

- Khir Rural District, Fars province, Iran
- Banavan, Fars, a village in Khir Rural District
- Mobarakabad, Estahban, a village in Khir Rural District
- Kheer, a pudding or porridge popular in the Indian subcontinent
