= Qashm Qavi =

Qashm Qavi قشم قاوي
- Village
- Location within Iran
- Coordinates: 29°24′33″N 53°41′03″E
- Country: Iran
- Province: Fars
- County: Estahban
- Bakhsh: Runiz
- Rural District: Khir

Population (2006)
  - Total: 644
- Time zone: UTC+3:30 (IRST)
  - Summer (DST): UTC+4:30 (IRDT)

Qashm Qavi (Persian: قشم قاوي, also Romanized as Qashm Qāvī; also known as Qashan Qū’ī) is a village in Khir Rural District, Runiz District, Estahban County, Fars province, Iran. At the 2006 census, its population was 644, in 151 families.
