= Ab-e Narak =

Ab-e Narak آب نارک
- Village
- Location within Iran
- Coordinates: 28°57′52″N 54°17′49″E
- Country: Iran
- Province: Fars
- County: Estahban
- Bakhsh: Central
- Rural District: Ij

Population (2006)
  - Total: 191
- Time zone: UTC+3:30 (IRST)
  - Summer (DST): UTC+4:30 (IRDT)

Ab-e Narak (Persian: آب نارک, also Romanized as Āb-e Nārak; also known as Ab Anarak, Āb Anārak, and Āb-e Anārak) is a village in Ij Rural District, in the Central District of Estahban County, Fars province, Iran. At the 2006 census, its population was 191, in 39 families.
