= Anjirak, Fars =

Anjirak انجيرك
- Village
- Location within Iran
- Coordinates: 28°57′23″N 54°19′49″E
- Country: Iran
- Province: Fars
- County: Estahban
- Bakhsh: Central
- Rural District: Ij

Population (2006)
  - Total: 524
- Time zone: UTC+3:30 (IRST)
  - Summer (DST): UTC+4:30 (IRDT)

Anjirak (Persian: انجيرك, also Romanized as Anjīrak; also known as Anjīrak-e Soflá) is a village in Ij Rural District, in the Central District of Estahban County, Fars province, Iran. At the 2006 census, its population was 524 in 123 families.
