= Shamsabad, Estahban =

Village in Fars, Iran

Shamsabad شمس اباد
- Village
- Location within Iran
- Coordinates: 29°11′22″N 53°39′41″E
- Country: Iran
- Province: Fars
- County: Estahban
- Bakhsh: Runiz
- Rural District: Runiz

Population (2006)
  - Total: 430
- Time zone: UTC+3:30 (IRST)
  - Summer (DST): UTC+4:30 (IRDT)

Shamsabad (Persian: شمس اباد, also Romanized as Shamsābād) is a village in Runiz Rural District, Runiz District, Estahban County, Fars province, Iran. At the 2006 census, its population was 430, in 91 families.
