= Dastjerd, Estahban =

Dastjerd دستجرد
- Village
- Location within Iran
- Coordinates: 29°16′20″N 53°55′23″E
- Country: Iran
- Province: Fars
- County: Estahban
- Bakhsh: Runiz
- Rural District: Khir

Population (2006)
  - Total: 1,173
- Time zone: UTC+3:30 (IRST)
  - Summer (DST): UTC+4:30 (IRDT)

Dastjerd (Persian: دستجرد) is a village in Khir Rural District, Runiz District, Estahban County, Fars province, Iran. At the 2006 census, its population was 1,173, in 285 families.
