= Mohammadabad, Estahban =

Mohammadabad محمداباد
- Village
- Location within Iran
- Coordinates: 29°14′51″N 53°59′06″E
- Country: Iran
- Province: Fars
- County: Estahban
- Bakhsh: Runiz
- Rural District: Khir

Population (2006)
  - Total: 1,268
- Time zone: UTC+3:30 (IRST)
  - Summer (DST): UTC+4:30 (IRDT)

Mohammadabad (Persian: محمداباد, also Romanized as Moḩammadābād) is a village in Khir Rural District, Runiz District, Estahban County, Fars province, Iran. At the 2006 census, its population was 1,268, in 323 families.
