= Darbandan =

Darbandan دربندان
- Village
- Location within Iran
- Coordinates: 29°15′01″N 53°54′13″E
- Country: Iran
- Province: Fars
- County: Estahban
- Bakhsh: Runiz
- Rural District: Khir

Population (2006)
  - Total: 118
- Time zone: UTC+3:30 (IRST)
  - Summer (DST): UTC+4:30 (IRDT)

Darbandan (Persian: دربندان, also Romanized as Darbandān) is a village in Khir Rural District, Runiz District, Estahban County, Fars province, Iran. At the 2006 census, its population was 118, in 28 families.
