= Pol Shekasteh, Fars =

Pol Shekasteh پل شكسته
- Village
- Location within Iran
- Coordinates: 28.8568677°N 54.4047676°E
- Country: Iran
- Province: Fars
- County: Estahban
- Bakhsh: Central
- Rural District: Estahban

Population (2006)
  - Total: 109
- Time zone: UTC+03:30 (IRST)
  - Summer (DST): UTC+04:30 (IRDT)

Pol Shekasteh (Persian: پل شكسته) is a village in Ij Rural District, in the central district of Estahban, Fars province, Iran. At the 2006 census, its population was 109, in 27 families.
