= Third gender =

Gender identity as neither man nor woman

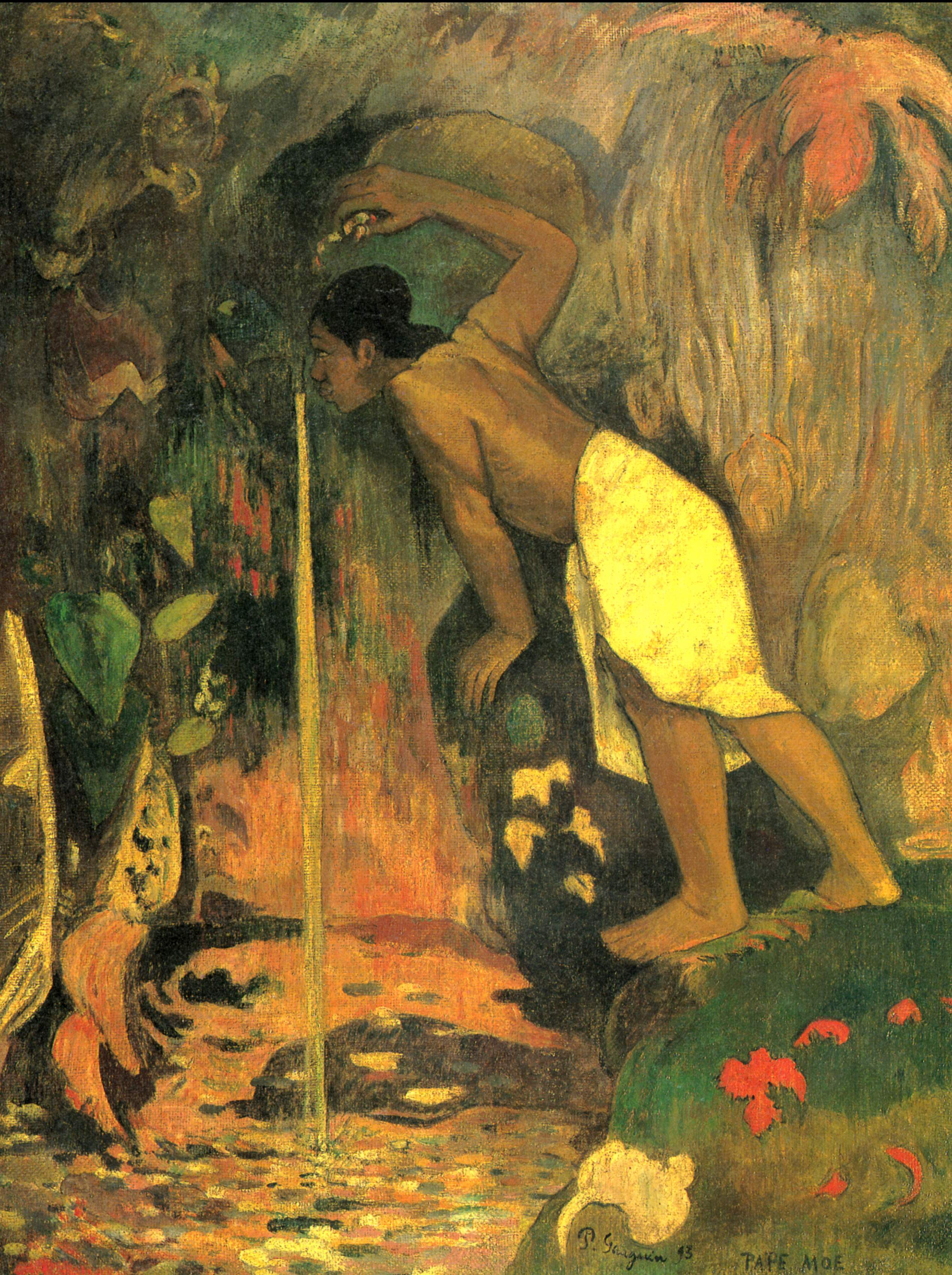
Pape Moe (Mysterious Water), a painting by Paul Gauguin depicting a Tahitian māhū

Third gender or third sex is an identity recognizing individuals categorized, either by themselves or by society, as neither a man nor a woman. Many gender systems around the world include three or more genders, deriving the concept either from the traditional, historical recognition of such individuals or from its modern development in the LGBTQ community, which can include third gender people as a non-binary identity. The term third is usually understood to mean "other", though some societies use the concept to encompass fourth and fifth genders.

The state of personally identifying as, or being identified by society as, a man, a woman, or other is usually also defined by the individual's gender identity and gender role in the particular culture in which they live.

Most cultures use a gender binary, having two genders (boys/men and girls/women). In cultures with a third or fourth gender, these genders may represent very different things. To Native Hawaiians and Tahitians, māhū is an intermediate state between man and woman known as "gender liminality", part of a wider MVPFAFF spectrum. Many Indigenous North American traditions recognize third or fourth gender people in a variety of ceremonial roles, sometimes categorized in the modern day under the umbrella identity of Two-Spirit to reflect the spiritual and Indigenous contexts of such practices. The term "third gender" has also been used to describe the hijras of South Asia, the fa'afafine of Polynesia, and the sworn virgins of the Balkans. Third gender traditions can arise to fulfill ritual or religious roles to emphasize a positive social status, however a culture recognizing a third gender does not in itself mean that they were valued by that culture, with some practices developing as direct reactions to the devaluation of women in one's culture.

While found in a number of non-Western cultures, concepts of "third", "fourth", and "fifth" gender roles are still somewhat new to mainstream Western culture and conceptual thought. While mainstream Western scholars—notably anthropologists who have tried to write about the South Asian hijras or the Native American "gender variant" and two-spirit people—have often sought to understand the term "third gender" solely in the language of the modern LGBT community, other scholars—especially Indigenous scholars—stress that mainstream scholars' lack of cultural understanding and context has led to widespread misrepresentation of the people these scholars place in the third gender category, as well as misrepresentations of the cultures in question, including whether or not this concept actually applies to these cultures at all.

== Sex and gender ==
Third gender recognition

World map of nonbinary gender recognition Nonbinary / third gender option available as voluntary opt-in Opt-in for intersex people only Standard for third gender Standard for intersex Nonbinary / third gender option not legally recognized / no data

Since at least the 1970s, anthropologists have described gender categories in some cultures which they could not adequately explain using a two-gender framework. At the same time, feminists began to draw a distinction between sex and (social/psychological) gender.

Anthropologist Michael G. Peletz believes our notions of different types of genders (including the attitudes toward the third gender) deeply affect our lives and reflect our values in society. In Peletz' book, "Gender, Sexuality, and Body Politics in Modern Asia", he describes:

For our purposes, the term "gender" designates the cultural categories, symbols, meanings, practices, and institutionalized arrangements bearing on at least five sets of phenomena: (1) females and femininity; (2) males and masculinity; (3) Androgynes, who are partly male and partly female in appearance or of indeterminate sex/gender, as well as intersex individuals, also known as hermaphrodites, who to one or another degree may have both male and female sexual organs or characteristics; (4) transgender people, who engage in practices that transgress or transcend normative boundaries and are thus by definition "transgressively gendered"; and (5) neutered or unsexed/ungendered individuals such as eunuchs.

=== Transgender people and third gender ===
Gender may be recognized and organized differently in different cultures. In some non-Western cultures, gender may not be seen as binary, or people may be seen as being able to cross freely between male and female, or to exist in a state that is in-between, or neither. In some cultures, being third gender may be associated with the gift of being able to mediate between the world of the spirits and the world of humans. For cultures with these spiritual beliefs, it is generally seen as a positive thing, though some third gender people have also been accused of witchcraft and persecuted. In most western cultures, people who did not conform to heteronormative ideals were often seen as sick, disordered, or insufficiently formed. However, as of 2013, individuals who live in countries where the Diagnostic and Statistical Manual of Mental Disorders is used, being labeled as disordered for being transgender would no longer occur due to the manual's update. Instead, a new diagnosis was announced called gender dysphoria. This new diagnosis highlights the distress a transgender person may experience rather than labels individuals who identify with a third gender as sick or disordered.

The Indigenous māhū of Hawaii are seen as embodying an intermediate state between man and woman, known as "gender liminality". Some traditional Dineh of the Southwestern US recognize a spectrum of four genders: feminine woman, masculine woman, feminine man, masculine man. The term "third gender" has also been used to describe the hijras of South Asia who have gained legal identity, the fa'afafine of Polynesia, and the Albanian sworn virgins.

In some indigenous communities in Africa, a woman can be recognized as a "female husband" who enjoys all the privileges of men and is recognized as such, but whose femaleness, while not openly acknowledged, is not forgotten either.

The hijras of South Asia are one of the most recognized groups of third gender people. Some western commentators (Hines and Sanger) have theorized that this could be a result of the Hindu belief in reincarnation, in which gender, sex, and even species can change from lifetime to lifetime, perhaps allowing for a more fluid interpretation. There are other cultures in which the third gender is seen as an intermediate state of being rather than as a movement from one conventional sex to the other.

In a study of people in the United States who thought themselves to be members of a third gender, Ingrid M. Sell found that they typically felt different from the age of 5. Because of both peer and parental pressure, those growing up with the most ambiguous appearances had the most troubled childhoods and difficulties later in life. Sell also discovered similarities between the third genders of the East and those of the West. Nearly half of those interviewed were healers or in the medical profession. Many of them, again like their Eastern counterparts, were artistic, and several were able to make a living from their artistic abilities. The capacity to mediate between men and women was a common skill, and third genders were oftentimes thought to possess an unusually wide perspective and the ability to understand both sides. A notable result of Sell's study is that 93% of the third genders interviewed, again like their Eastern counterparts, reported "paranormal"-type abilities.

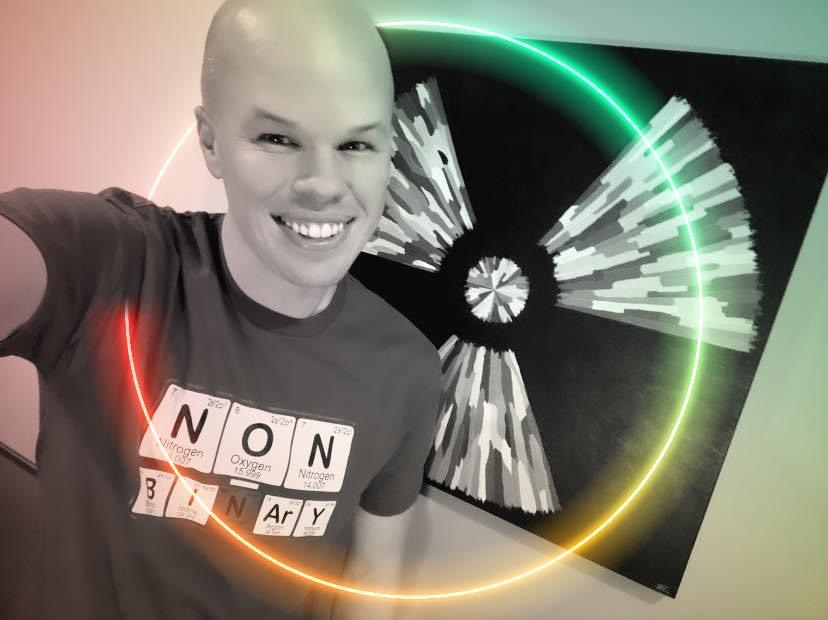
Identifying as gender-fluid, American nuclear engineer Sam Brinton uses they/them pronouns.

In recent years, some Western societies have begun to recognize non-binary or genderqueer identities. Some years after Alex MacFarlane, Australian Norrie May-Welby was recognized as having unspecified status. In 2016, an Oregon circuit court ruled that a resident, Elisa Rae Shupe, could legally change gender to non-binary.

The Open Society Foundations published a report, License to Be Yourself in May 2014, documenting "some of the world's most progressive and rights-based laws and policies that enable trans people to change their gender identity on official documents". The report comments on the recognition of third classifications, stating:

From a rights-based perspective, third sex/gender options should be voluntary, providing trans people with a third choice about how to define their gender identity. Those identifying as a third sex/gender should have the same rights as those identifying as male or female.

The document also quotes Mauro Cabral of GATE:

People tend to identify a third sex with freedom from the gender binary, but that is not necessarily the case. If only trans and/or intersex people can access that third category, or if they are compulsively assigned to a third sex, then the gender binary gets stronger, not weaker.

The report concludes that two or three options are insufficient: "A more inclusive approach would be to increase options for people to self-define their sex and gender identity."

=== Third gender and sexual orientation ===
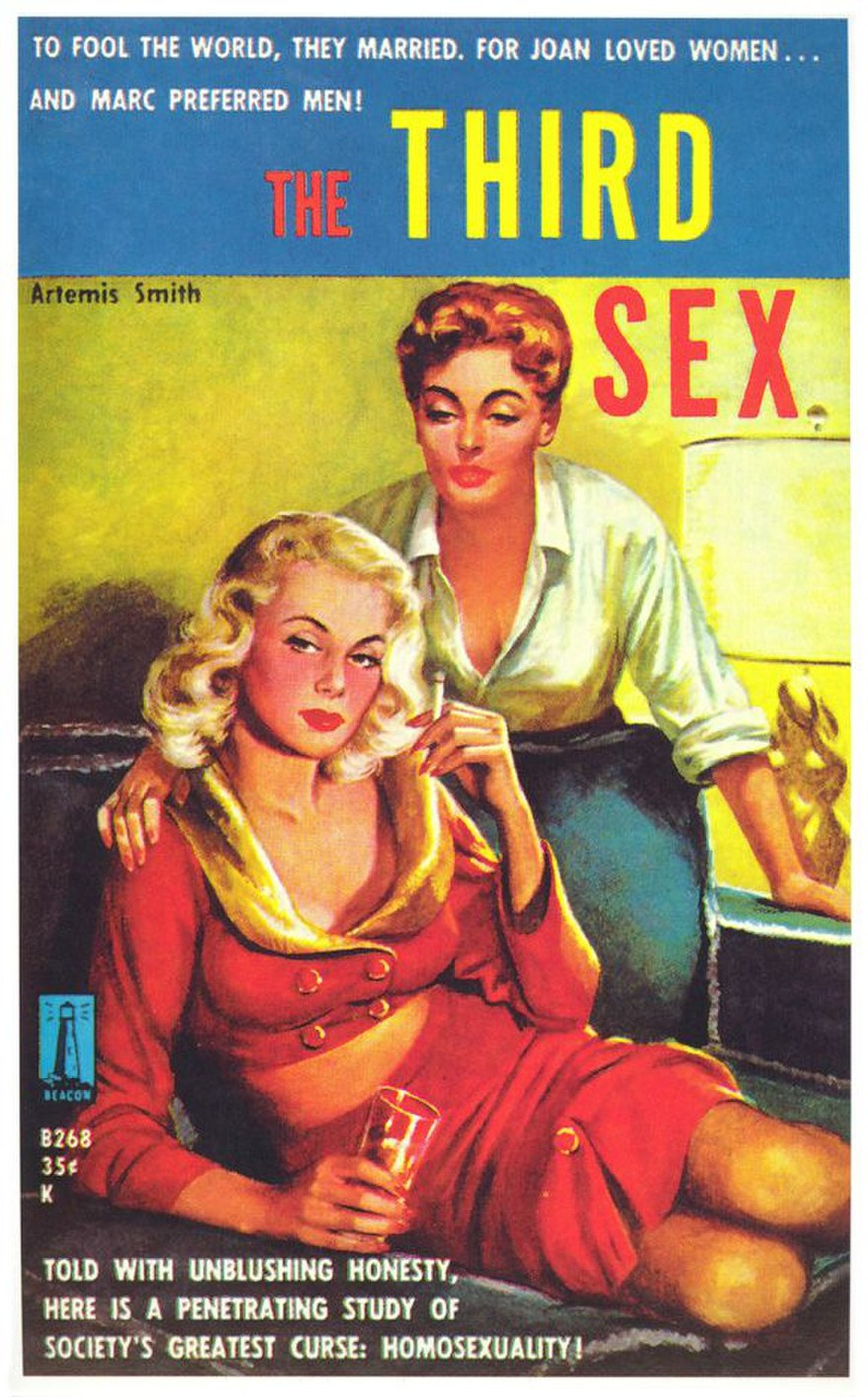
Cover of Artemis Smith's 1959 lesbian pulp fiction novel The Third Sex

Before the sexual revolution of the 1960s, there was no common non-derogatory vocabulary in modern English for non-heterosexuality; terms such as "third gender" trace back to the 1860s.

One such term, Uranian, was used in the 19th century for a person of a third sex—originally, someone with "a female psyche in a male body" who is sexually attracted to men. Its definition was later extended to cover homosexual gender variant females and a number of other sexual types. It is believed to be an English adaptation of the German word Urning, which was first published by activist Karl Heinrich Ulrichs (1825–95) in a series of five booklets (1864–65) that were collected under the title Forschungen über das Räthsel der mannmännlichen Liebe ("Research into the Riddle of Man-Male Love"). Ulrich developed his terminology before the first public use of the term "homosexual", which appeared in 1869 in a pamphlet published anonymously by Karl-Maria Kertbeny (1824–82). Ulrich is widely regarded as one of the pioneering theorists who advocated for the natural occurrence of same-sex attraction, and he believed that such an orientation does not warrant criminalization. The word Uranian (Urning) was derived by Ulrichs from the Greek goddess Aphrodite Urania, who was created out of the god Uranus' testicles. German lesbian activist Anna Rüling used the term in a 1904 speech, "What Interest Does the Women's Movement Have in Solving the Homosexual Problem?"

According to some scholars, the West is trying to reinterpret and redefine ancient third-gender identities to fit the Western concept of sexual orientation. In Redefining Fa'afafine: Western Discourses and the Construction of Transgenderism in Samoa, Johanna Schmidt argues that the Western attempts to reinterpret fa'afafine, the third gender in Samoan culture, make it have more to do with sexual orientation than gender. She also argues that this is actually changing the nature of fa'afafine itself, and making it more "homosexual".

A Samoan fa'afafine said, "But I would like to pursue a master's degree with a paper on homosexuality from a Samoan perspective that would be written for educational purposes because I believe some of the stuff that has been written about us is quite wrong."

In How to become a Berdache: Toward a unified analysis of gender diversity, Will Roscoe, using an anthropological term Indigenous people have always found offensive, writes that "this pattern can be traced from the earliest accounts of the Spaniards to present-day ethnographies. What has been written about berdaches reflects more the influence of existing Western discourses on gender, sexuality and the Other than what observers actually witnessed."

According to Towle and Morgan:

Ethnographic examples [of ‘third genders’] can come from distinct societies located in Thailand, Polynesia, Melanesia, Native America, western Africa, and elsewhere and from any point in history, from Ancient Greece to sixteenth-century England to contemporary North America. Popular authors routinely simplify their descriptions, ignoring...or conflating dimensions that seem to them extraneous, incomprehensible, or ill-suited to the images they want to convey (484).

Western scholars often do not make a distinction between people of the third gender and males; they are often lumped together. The scholars usually use gender roles as a way to explain sexual relations between the third gender and males. For example, when analyzing the non-normative sex gender categories in Theravada Buddhism, Peter A. Jackson says it appears that within early Buddhist communities, men who engaged in receptive anal sex were seen as feminized and were thought to be hermaphrodites. In contrast, men who engaged in oral sex were not seen as crossing sex/gender boundaries, but rather as engaging in abnormal sexual practices without threatening their masculine gendered existence.

Some writers suggest that a third gender emerged around 1700 in England: the male sodomite. According to these writers, this was marked by the emergence of a subculture of effeminate males and their meeting places (molly houses), as well as a marked increase in hostility towards effeminate or homosexual males. People described themselves as members of a third sex in Europe from at least the 1860s with the writings of Karl Heinrich Ulrichs and continuing in the late nineteenth century with Magnus Hirschfeld, John Addington Symonds, Edward Carpenter, Aimée Duc and others. These writers described themselves and those like them as being of an "inverted" or "intermediate" sex and experiencing homosexual desire, and their writing argued for social acceptance of such sexual intermediates. Many cited precedents from classical Greek and Sanskrit literature (see below).

Throughout much of the twentieth century, the term "third sex" was a common descriptor for homosexuals and gender nonconformists, but after the gay liberation movements of the 1970s and a growing separation of the concepts of sexual orientation and gender identity, the term fell out of favor among LGBT communities and the wider public. With the renewed exploration of gender that feminism, the modern transgender movement, and queer theory has fostered, some in the contemporary West have begun to describe themselves as a third sex again. Other modern identities that cover similar ground include pangender, bigender, genderqueer, androgyne, intergender, "other gender" and "differently gendered".

=== Third gender and feminism ===
In Wilhelmine Germany, the terms drittes Geschlecht ("third sex") and Mannweib ("man-woman") were also used to describe feminists – both by their opponents and sometimes by feminists themselves. In the 1899 novel Das dritte Geschlecht (The Third Sex) by Ernst von Wolzogen, feminists are portrayed as "neuters" with external female characteristics accompanied by a crippled male psyche.

== Legal recognition ==
Several countries have adopted laws to accommodate non-binary gender identities. As of 2019, the state of California the United States non-binary has become an option for individuals to select the sex category on their driver's license, birth certificates, and identity cards; this all became possible with the passing of California's Gender Recognition Act (SB 179).

== Modern societies without legal recognition ==
The following gender categories have also been described as a third gender:

=== Africa ===
- Angola: Chibados, third-gendered shamans in the Ndongo kingdom.
- Democratic Republic of the Congo: Mangaiko among the Mbo people.
- Kenya: Mashoga of Swahili-speaking areas of the Kenyan coast, particularly Mombasa.
- Southern Ethiopia: Ashtime of Maale culture.

=== Asia-Pacific ===
- In the Philippines, a number of local sex/gender identities are commonly referred to as a 'third sex' in popular discourse, as well as by some academic studies. Local terms for these identities (which are considered derogatory by some) include baklâ and binabae (Tagalog), bayot (Cebuano), agi (Ilonggo), bantut (Tausug), badíng – all of which refer to 'gay' men or trans women. Gender variant females may be called lakin-on or tomboy.
- Japan: X-gender (Xジェンダー) is a transgender identity that is not female or male, similar to "genderqueer" or "nonbinary". The term X-gender came into use during the latter 1990s, popularized by queer organizations in Kansai, in Osaka and Kyoto. In 2019, Japan LGBT Research Institute Inc. conducted an online survey, collecting 348,000 valid responses from people aged 20 to 69, not all of whom were LGBT. 2.5% of the respondents called themselves X-gender.
- Micronesia: Palao'ana in Chamorro language, Northern Marianas Islands including Guam.
- Polynesia: Fa'afafine (Samoan), fakaleiti (Tongan), mahu (Hawaiian), mahu vahine (Tahitian), Rae-Rae (Tahitian), whakawahine (New Zealand Māori), sistergirls and brotherboys (Aboriginal Australians and Torres Strait Islanders) and akava'ine (Cook Islands Māori).
- Indonesia: Bissu (Bugis), waria (pan-Indonesian term from 1978)

=== Europe ===
- 18th century England: Mollies
- 19th century England: Uranian
- Albania: Sworn virgins, females who work and dress as men and inhabit some men-only spaces, but do not marry.
- Femminiello, in Neapolitan culture

=== Latin America and the Caribbean ===
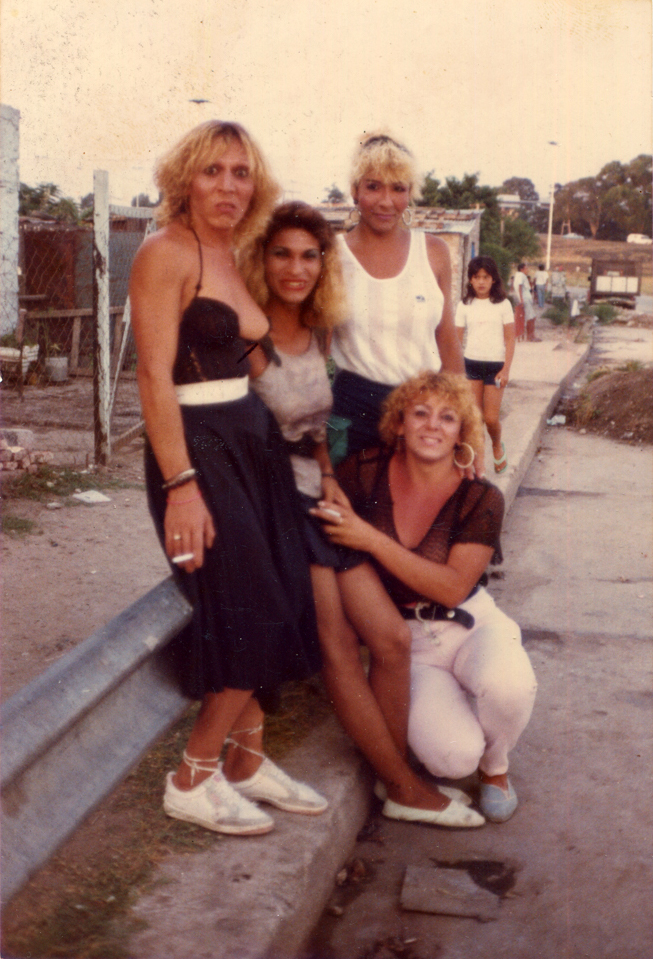
A group of Argentine travestis working as street prostitutes at a slum in Buenos Aires Province, 1989.

- Biza'ah: In Teotitlán, they have their own version of the muxe that they call biza'ah. According to Stephen, there were only 7 individuals in that community considered to be biza'ah in comparison to the muxe, of which there were many. Like the muxe they were well-liked and accepted in the community. Their way of walking, talking and the work that they perform are markers of recognizing biza'ah.
- Southern Mexico: Muxe, In many Zapotec communities, third gender roles are often apparent. The muxe are described as a third gender; biologically male but with feminine characteristics. They are not considered to be homosexuals, but rather just another gender. Some will marry women and have families, others will form relationships with men. Although it is recognized that these individuals have the bodies of men, they perform gender differently than men, it is not a masculine persona, but neither is it a feminine persona that they perform but, in general, a combination of the two. Lynn Stephen quotes Jeffrey Rubin, "Prominent men who [were] rumoured to be homosexual and did not adopt the muxe identity were spoken of pejoratively", suggesting that muxe gender role was more acceptable in the community.
- The travestis of Latin America have been considered an expression of a third gender by a wide range of anthropological studies, although this view has been contested by later authors.
- Tida wena: Among the Indigenous Warao people of Venezuela, Guyana and Suriname, people considered to be neither man nor woman. Historically respected, and sometimes serving as shamans or in other honored positions in their tribes.

=== Middle East ===
- Oman: Xanith or khanith.

=== North American indigenous cultures ===
Two-Spirit is a modern umbrella term created at an Indigenous lesbian and gay conference in 1990 with the primary intent of replacing the offensive term "berdache", which had been, and in some quarters still is, the term used for gay and gender-variant Indigenous people by non-Native anthropologists. "Berdache" has also been used to describe slave boys, sold into sexual servitude. Kyle De Vries writes, "Berdache is a derogatory term created by Europeans and perpetuated by anthropologists and others to define Native American/First Nations people who varied from Western norms that perceive gender, sex, and sexuality as binaries and inseparable." Mary Annette Pember adds, "Unfortunately, depending on an oral tradition to impart our ways to future generations opened the floodgates for early non-Native explorers, missionaries, and anthropologists to write books describing Native peoples and therefore bolstering their own role as experts. These writings were and still are entrenched in the perspective of the authors who were and are mostly white men." This has resulted in widely diverse traditions of gender-variant and third-gender traditions among the over 500 living Native American communities being homogenized and misrepresented under English-language names, and widely misinterpreted by both non-Native and disconnected descendants alike. "[Two-Spirit] implies that the individual is both male and female and that these aspects are intertwined within them. The term moves away from traditional Native American/First Nations cultural identities and meanings of sexuality and gender variance. It does not take into account the terms and meanings from individual nations and tribes. ... Although two-spirit implies to some a spiritual nature, that one holds the spirit of two, both male and female, traditional Native Americans/First Nations peoples view this as a Western concept."

At the conferences that produced the book, Two-Spirited People, I heard several First Nations people describe themselves as very much unitary, neither "male" nor "female," much less a pair in one body. Nor did they report an assumption of duality within one body as a common concept within reservation communities; rather, people confided dismay at the Western proclivity for dichotomies. Outside Indo-European-speaking societies, "gender" would not be relevant to the social personae glosses "men" and "women," and "third gender" likely would be meaningless. The unsavory word "berdache" certainly ought to be ditched (Jacobs et al. 1997:3-5), but the urban American neologism "two-spirit" can be misleading.

While some have found the new term two-spirit a useful tool for intertribal organizing, it is not based in the traditional terms, and has not met with acceptance by more traditional communities; the tribes who have traditional ceremonial roles for gender-variant people use names in their own languages, and have generally rejected this "binary" neologism as "Western".

== History ==
=== Old World ===
==== Egypt ====
Inscribed pottery shards from the Middle Kingdom of Egypt (2000–1800 BCE) found near ancient Thebes (now Luxor, Egypt), list three human genders: tai (male), sḫt ("sekhet") and hmt (female). Sḫt is often translated as "eunuch", although there is little evidence that such individuals were castrated.

==== Mesopotamia ====
Stone tablet from 2nd millennium BC Sumer containing a myth about the creation of a type of human who is neither man nor woman.

In Mesopotamian mythology, among the earliest written records of humanity, there are references to types of people who are not men and not women. In a Sumerian creation myth found on a stone tablet from the second millennium BC, the goddess Ninmah fashions a being "with no male organ and no female organ", for whom Enki finds a position in society: "to stand before the king". In the Akkadian myth of Atra-Hasis (ca. 1700 BC), Enki instructs Nintu, the goddess of birth, to establish a "third category among the people" in addition to men and women, that includes demons who steal infants, women who are unable to give birth, and priestesses who are prohibited from bearing children. The term sal-nu-bar has been interpreted as referring to women who were permitted to marry but forbidden to bear children, and who therefore brought other women with them to bear children on their behalf; according to this interpretation, if they bore children themselves, they were expected to conceal them or cast them out, as in the tradition concerning Sargon's mother.

In Babylonia, Sumer and Assyria, certain types of individuals who performed religious duties in the service of Inanna/Ishtar have been described as a third gender. They worked as sacred prostitutes or Hierodules, performed ecstatic dance, music and plays, wore masks and had gender characteristics of both women and men. The term sal-zikrum, attested in Old Babylonian texts and mentioned in the Code of Hammurabi (c. 1700 BC), may translate to "woman-man" and refer to a gender-nonconforming individual, "perhaps a female functionary, attached to a temple." The word is regularly treated as grammatically feminine, and a sal-zikrum inherited the same amount as her brothers. According to some interpretations, a sal-zikrum could also marry women. In Sumer, they were given the cuneiform names of ur.sal ("dog/man-woman") and kur.gar.ra (also described as a man-woman). Modern scholars, struggling to describe them using contemporary sex/gender categories, have variously described them as "living as women", or used descriptors such as hermaphrodites, eunuchs, homosexuals, transvestites, effeminate males and a range of other terms and phrases.

==== Indic culture ====
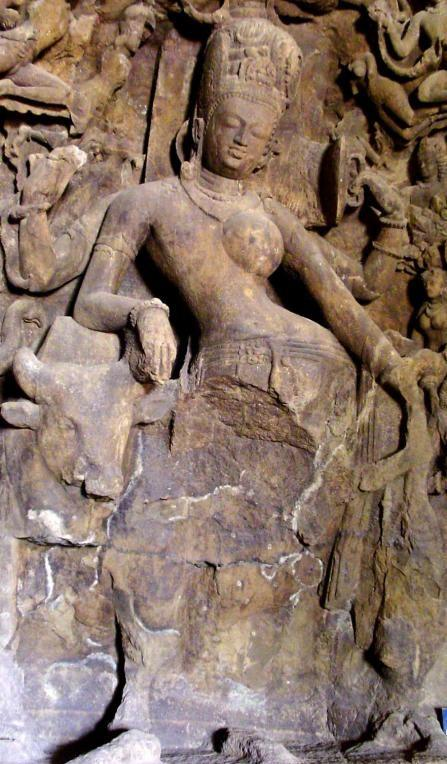
The Hindu god Shiva is often represented as Ardhanarisvara, with a dual male and female nature. Typically, Ardhanarisvara's right side is male and left side female. This sculpture is from the Elephanta Caves near Mumbai.

References to a third sex can be found throughout the texts of India's religious traditions like Jainism and Buddhism – and it can be inferred that Vedic culture recognised three genders. The Vedas (c. 1500 BC–500 BC) describe individuals as belonging to one of three categories, according to one's nature or prakrti. These are also spelled out in the Kama Sutra (c. 4th century AD) and elsewhere as pums-prakrti (male-nature), stri-prakrti (female-nature), and tritiya-prakrti (third-nature). Texts suggest that third sex individuals were well known in premodern India and included male-bodied or female-bodied people as well as intersex people, and that they can often be recognised from childhood.

A third sex is discussed in ancient Hindu law, medicine, linguistics and astrology. The foundational work of Hindu law, the Manu Smriti (c. 200 BC–200 AD) explains the biological origins of the three sexes:

A male child is produced by a greater quantity of male seed, a female child by the prevalence of the female; if both are equal, a third-sex child or boy and girl twins are produced; if either are weak or deficient in quantity, a failure of conception results.

Indian linguist Patañjali's work on Sanskrit grammar, the Mahābhāṣya (c. 200 BC), states that Sanskrit's three grammatical genders are derived from three natural genders. The earliest Tamil grammar, the Tolkappiyam (3rd century BC) refers to hermaphrodites as a third "neuter" gender (in addition to a feminine category of unmasculine males). In Vedic astrology, the nine planets are each assigned to one of the three genders; the third gender, tritiya-prakrti, is associated with Mercury, Saturn and (in particular) Ketu. In the Puranas, there are references to three kinds of devas of music and dance: apsaras (female), gandharvas (male) and kinnars (neuter).

The two great Sanskrit epic poems, the Ramayana and the Mahabharata, indicates the existence of a third gender in ancient Indic society. Some versions of Ramayana tell that in one part of the story, the hero Rama heads into exile in the forest. Halfway there, he discovers that most of the people of his hometown Ayodhya were following him. He told them, "Men and women, turn back", and with that, those who were "neither men nor women" did not know what to do, so they stayed there. When Rama returned from exile years later, he discovered them still there and blessed them, saying that there will be a day when they, too, will have a share in ruling the world.

In the Buddhist Vinaya, codified in its present form around the 2nd century BC and said to be handed down by oral tradition from Buddha himself, there are four main sex/gender categories: males, females, ubhatobyañjanaka (people of a dual sexual nature) and paṇḍaka (people of non-normative sexual natures, perhaps originally denoting a deficiency in male sexual capacity). As the Vinaya tradition developed, the term paṇḍaka came to refer to a broad third sex category which encompassed intersex, male and female-bodied people with physical or behavioural attributes that were considered inconsistent with the natural characteristics of man and woman.

==== Greco-Roman Classical Antiquity ====
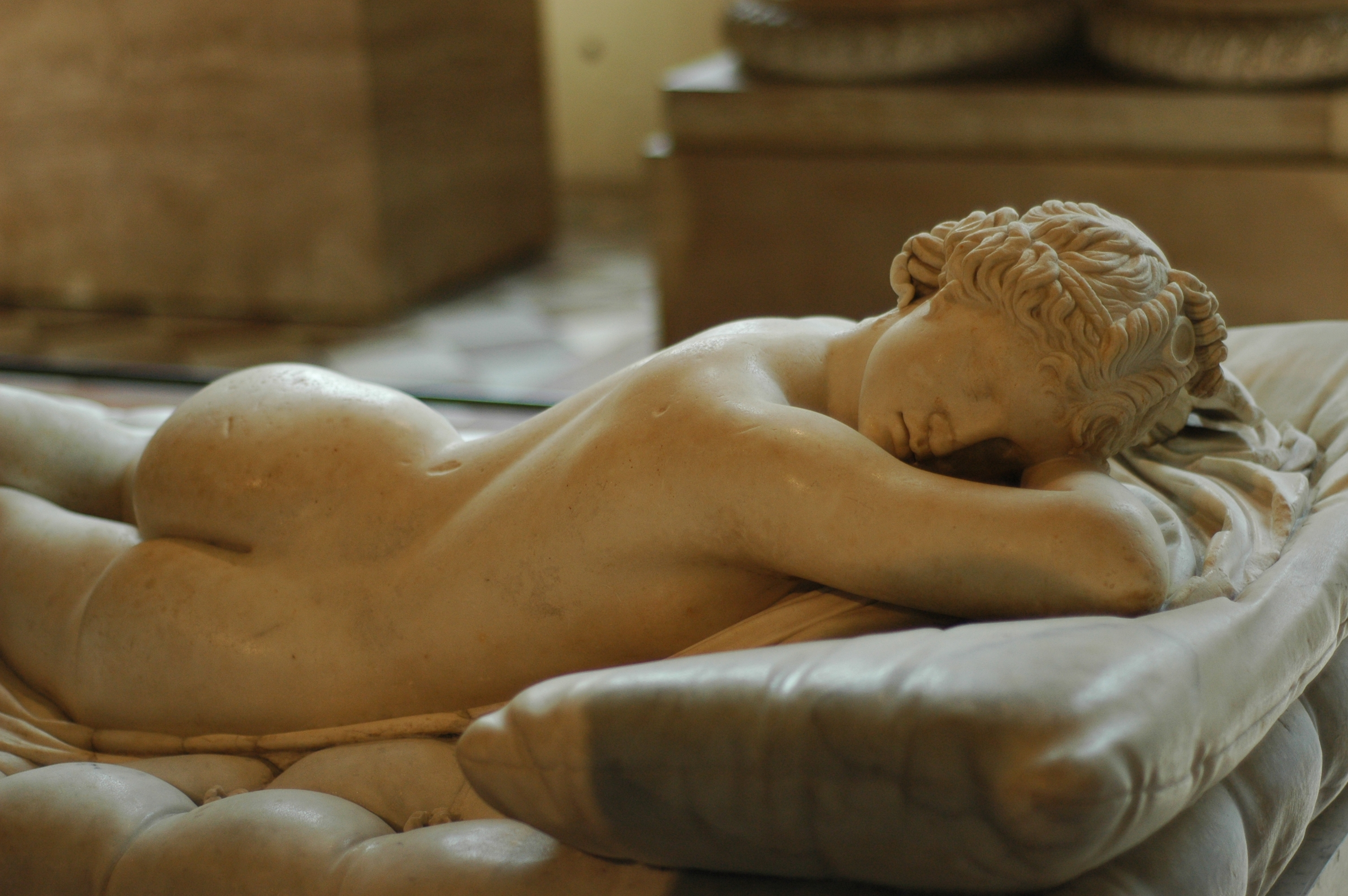
2nd-century Roman copy of a Greek sculpture of Hermaphroditus, from which the word hermaphrodite is derived.

In Plato's Symposium, written around the 4th century BC, Aristophanes relates a creation myth involving three original sexes: female, male and androgynous. They are split in half by Zeus, producing four different contemporary sex/gender types which seek to be reunited with their lost other half; in this account, the modern heterosexual man and woman descend from the original androgynous sex. The myth of Hermaphroditus involves heterosexual lovers merging into their primordial androgynous sex.

Other creation myths around the world share a belief in three original sexes, such as those from northern Thailand.

Many have interpreted the "eunuchs" of the Ancient Eastern Mediterranean world as a third gender that inhabited a liminal space between women and men, understood in their societies as somehow neither or both. In the Historia Augusta, the eunuch body is described as a tertium genus hominum (a third human gender). In 77 BC, a eunuch named Genucius was prevented from claiming goods left to him in a will, on the grounds that he had voluntarily mutilated himself (amputatis sui ipsius) and was neither a woman or a man (neque virorum neque mulierum numero) according to Valerius Maximus. Several scholars have argued that the eunuchs in the Hebrew Bible and the New Testament were understood in their time to belong to a third gender, rather than the more recent interpretations of a kind of emasculated man, or a metaphor for chastity. The early Christian theologian, Tertullian, wrote that Jesus himself was a eunuch (c. 200 AD). Tertullian also noted the existence of a third sex (tertium sexus) among heathens: "a third race in sex... made of male and female in one." He may have been referring to the Galli, "eunuch" devotees of the Phrygian goddess Cybele, who were described as belonging to a third sex by several Roman writers.

==== Early modern Europe ====
The so-called "Balkan Sworn Virgins", which have been documented as early as the 19th century, are sometimes considered a separate gender category. Sworn virgins take an irreversible vow of chastity, and in so doing relinquish their sexual, reproductive, and social duties as women. They often dress as men, act as head of their households, and take on male duties. Breaking the vow was once punishable by death; though this is no longer the case today, breaking one's vow can result in social ostracization.

==== Jewish diaspora ====
In Rabbinical Jewish traditions there were 6 terms used to describe gender identity:

- Androgynos: both male and female genitalia (eternal doubt of legal gender)
- Ay'lonit: Barren female. Female genitalia, barren.
- Nekeva: female
- Saris: castrated or naturally infertile male (often translated as "eunuch")
- Tumtum: genitalia concealed by skin (unknown gender, unless skin removed)
- Zachar: male

==== Early Islamic world ====
Mukhannathun (مخنثون "effeminate ones", "ones who resemble women", singular mukhannath) was a term used in Classical Arabic to refer to effeminate men or people of ambiguous sex characteristics who appeared feminine or functioned socially in roles typically carried out by women. According to the Iranian scholar Mehrdad Alipour, "in the premodern period, Muslim societies were aware of five manifestations of gender ambiguity: This can be seen through figures such as the khasi (eunuch), the hijra, the mukhannath, the mamsuh and the khuntha (hermaphrodite/intersex)." Western scholars Aisya Aymanee M. Zaharin and Maria Pallotta-Chiarolli give the following explanation of the meaning of the term mukhannath and its derivate Arabic forms in the hadith literature: Mukhannathun, especially those in the city of Medina, are mentioned throughout the hadith and in the works of many early Arabic and Islamic writers. During the Rashidun era and first half of the Umayyad era, they were strongly associated with music and entertainment. During the Abbasid caliphate, the word itself was used as a descriptor for men employed as dancers, musicians, or comedians.

Mukhannathun existed in pre-Islamic Arabia, during the time of the Islamic prophet Muhammad, and early Islamic eras. A number of hadith indicate that mukhannathun were used as male servants for wealthy women in the early days of Islam, due to the belief that they were not sexually interested in the female body. These sources do not state that the mukhannathun were homosexual, only that they "lack desire". In later eras, the term mukhannath was associated with the receptive partner in gay sexual practices, an association that has persisted into the modern day. Khanith is a vernacular Arabic term used in some parts of the Arabian Peninsula to denote the gender role ascribed to males and occasionally intersex people who function sexually, and in some ways socially, as women. The term is closely related to the word mukhannath.

Early Islamic literature rarely comments upon the habits of the mukhannathun. It seems there may have been some variance in how "effeminate" they were, though there are indications that some adopted aspects of feminine dress or at least ornamentation. Some thirteenth and fourteenth-century scholars like al-Nawawi and al-Kirmani classified mukhannathun into two groups: those whose feminine traits seem unchangeable, despite the person's best efforts to stop them, and those whose traits are changeable but refuse to stop. Islamic scholars like Ibn Hajar al-Asqalani stated that all mukhannathun must make an effort to cease their feminine behavior, but if this proved impossible, they were not worthy of punishment. Those who made no effort to become less "effeminate", or seemed to "take pleasure in (his effeminacy)", were worthy of blame. By this era, mukhannath had developed its association with homosexuality, and Badr al-Din al-Ayni saw homosexuality as "a more heinous extension of takhannuth", or effeminate behavior.

One particularly prominent mukhannath with the laqab Ṭuways ("little peacock") was born in Medina on the day Muhammad died. There are few sources that describe why Tuways was labeled a mukhannath, or what behavior of his was considered effeminate. No sources describe his sexuality as immoral or imply that he was attracted to men, and he is reported to have married a woman and fathered several children in his later life. While he is described as non-religious or even frivolous towards religion in many sources, others contradict this and portray him as a believing Muslim instead. His main association with the label seems to come from his profession, as music was mainly performed by women in Arab societies.

=== Pre-Colonial Americas and Oceania ===
==== Mesoamerica ====
The ancient Maya civilization may have recognised a third gender, according to historian Matthew Looper. Looper notes the androgynous Maize Deity and masculine Moon goddess of Maya mythology, and iconography and inscriptions where rulers embody or impersonate these deities. He suggests that a Mayan third gender might also have included individuals with special roles such as healers or diviners.

Anthropologist and archaeologist Miranda Stockett notes that several writers have felt the need to move beyond a two-gender framework when discussing prehispanic cultures across Mesoamerica, and concludes that the Olmec, Aztec and Maya peoples understood "more than two kinds of bodies and more than two kinds of gender." Anthropologist Rosemary Joyce agrees, writing that "gender was a fluid potential, not a fixed category before the Spaniards came to Mesoamerica. Childhood training and ritual shaped, but did not set, adult gender, which could encompass third genders and alternative sexualities as well as "male" and "female." At the height of the Classic period, Maya rulers presented themselves as embodying the entire range of gender possibilities, from the male through the female, by wearing blended costumes and playing male and female roles in state ceremonies." Joyce notes that many figures of Mesoamerican art are depicted with male genitalia and female breasts, while she suggests that other figures in which chests and waists are exposed but no sexual characteristics (primary or secondary) are marked may represent a third sex, ambiguous gender, or androgyny.

==== Inca ====
Andean Studies scholar Michael Horswell writes that third-gendered ritual attendants to chuqui chinchay, a jaguar deity in Incan mythology, were "vital actors in Andean ceremonies" prior to Spanish colonisation. Horswell elaborates: "These quariwarmi (men-women) shamans mediated between the symmetrically dualistic spheres of Andean cosmology and daily life by performing rituals that at times required same-sex erotic practices. Their transvested attire served as a visible sign of a third space that negotiated between the masculine and the feminine, the present and the past, the living and the dead. Their shamanic presence invoked the androgynous creative force often represented in Andean mythology." Richard Trexler gives an early Spanish account of religious 'third gender' figures from the Inca empire in his 1995 book "Sex and Conquest":

And in each important temple or house of worship, they have a man or two, or more, depending on the idol, who go dressed in women's attire from the time they are children, and speak like them, and in manner, dress, and everything else they imitate women. With them especially the chiefs and headmen have carnal, foul intercourse on feast days and holidays, almost like a religious rite and ceremony.

==== Indigenous North Americans ====
With over 500 surviving Indigenous North American cultures, attitudes about sex and gender are diverse. Historically, some communities have had social or spiritual roles for people who in some way may manifest a third-gender, or another gender-variant way of being, at least some of the time, by their particular culture's standards. Some of these ways continue today, while others have died out due to colonialism. Some communities and individuals have adopted the pan-Indian neologism Two-spirit as a way of honoring contemporary figures and organizing intertribally.

Inuit religion states that one of the first angakkuq was a third gender being known as Itijjuaq who discovered the first amulet. Historically, Inuit in areas of the Canadian Arctic, such as Igloolik and Nunavik, had a third gender concept called sipiniq (Inuktitut: ᓯᐱᓂᖅ). A sipiniq infant was believed to have changed their physical sex from male to female at the moment of birth. Sipiniq children were regarded as socially male, and would be named after a male relative, perform a male's tasks, and would wear traditional clothing tailored for men's tasks. This generally lasted until puberty, but in some cases continued into adulthood and even after the sipiniq person married a man. The Netsilik Inuit used the word kipijuituq for a similar concept.

==== Melanesia ====
The Simbari people, indigenous to what is now Papua New Guinea, traditionally recognized a third sex, which included people born with a genetic condition common in the island's native population. The condition causes atypical genitalia at birth, which midwives could typically recognize, and classify them as kwolu-aatmwol (meaning "turning into a man"). Members of this third sex are typically socialized similarly to males, but are not seen as men. They take on masculine gender roles, and may be war leaders and shamans -- but they do not complete male initiation rites. Kwolu-aatmwol who were not properly identified at birth were socialized as women, and later were "discovered", often upon marriage. Many would move to distant towns where they could "pass" in society as men.

== Art, literature, and media ==
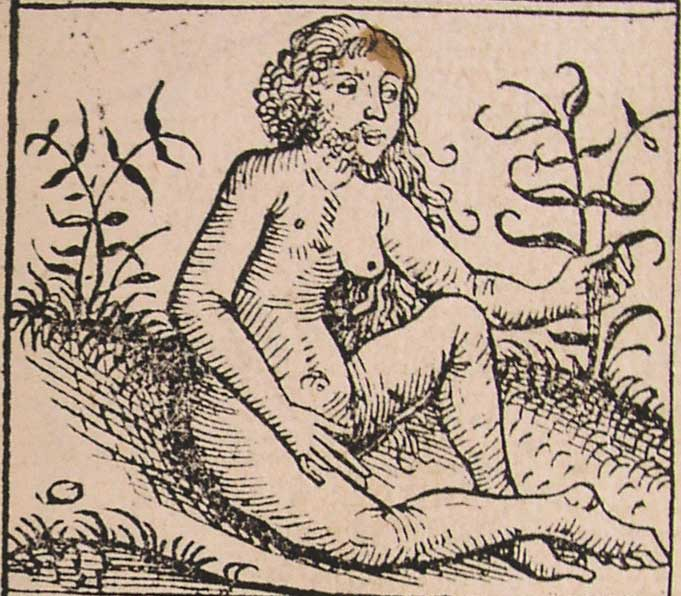
Illustration from the Nuremberg Chronicle, by Hartmann Schedel (1440–1514)

In David Lindsay's 1920 novel A Voyage to Arcturus there is a type of being called phaen, a third gender that is attracted neither to men nor women but to "Faceny" (their name for Shaping or Crystalman, the Demiurge). The appropriate pronouns are ae and aer.

Mikaël, a 1924 film directed by Carl Theodor Dreyer, was also released as Chained: The Story of the Third Sex in the USA.

Literary critic Michael Maiwald identifies a "third-sex ideal" in one of the first African-American bestsellers, Claude McKay's Home to Harlem (1928).

Djuna Barnes' 1936 novel Nightwood touches on the "third sex" in the chapter Go Down, Matthew (148).

Kurt Vonnegut's 1969 novel Slaughterhouse-Five identifies seven human sexes (not genders) in the fourth dimension required for reproduction including gay men, women over 65, and infants who died before their first birthday. The Tralfamadorian race has five sexes.

In bro'Town (2004–2009), Brother Ken is the principal of the school and is fa'afafine, a Samoan concept for a third gender, a person who is born biologically male but is raised and sees themself as female. Because the concept does not readily translate, when the series was broadcast on Adult Swim Latin America, a decision was made not to translate Samoan words and just present them as part of the "cultural journey".

In Knights of Sidonia (2014–2015), Izana Shinatose belongs to a new, nonbinary third gender that originated during the hundreds of years of human emigration into space, as first shown in the episode "Commencement." Izana later turns into a girl after falling in love with Nagate Tanasake.

== Spirituality ==
In Hinduism, Shiva is still worshipped as an Ardhnarishwara, i.e. half-male and half-female form. Shiva's symbol, which is today known as Shivalinga, actually comprises a combination of a 'Yoni' (vagina) and a 'Lingam' (phallus).

At the turn of the common era, male cults devoted to a goddess that flourished throughout the broad region extending from the Mediterranean to South Asia. While galli were missionizing the Roman Empire, kalū, kurgarrū, and assinnu continued to carry out ancient rites in the temples of Mesopotamia, and the third-gender predecessors of the hijra were clearly evident. It should also be mentioned of the eunuch priests of Artemis at Ephesus; the western Semitic qedeshim, the male "temple prostitutes" known from the Hebrew Bible and Ugaritic texts of the late second millennium; and the keleb, priests of Astarte at Kition and elsewhere. Beyond India, modern ethnographic literature documents gender-variant shaman-priests throughout Southeast Asia, Borneo, and Sulawesi. All these roles share the traits of devotion to a goddess, gender transgression and receptive anal sex, ecstatic ritual techniques (for healing, in the case of kalū and Mesopotamian priests, and fertility in the case of hijra), and actual (or symbolic) castration. Most, at some point in their history, were based in temples and, therefore, part of the religious-economic administration of their respective city-states.

The Islamic conception of the "perfect human being" (al-Insān al-Kāmil) is, as evident from the writings of ibn Arabi, genderless, and both women and men could equally attain this stage of spiritual development, which is further reflected in genderless form of the term kamāl.

== Criticism ==
Scholars have made several criticisms of the third gender concept. These critiques regard primarily Western scholars' use of the concept to understand gender in other cultures in an ethnocentric way. Third gender has also been criticized as a reductionist "junk drawer" used for all identities beyond the Western gender binary, ignoring the nuance of various identities, histories, and practices in other cultures to situate them in a Western understanding. As Towle and Morgan write, "The term third gender does not disrupt gender binarism; it simply adds another category (albeit a segregated, ghettoized category) to the existing two." Towle and Morgan additionally note that Western scholars may incorrectly treat non-Western third gender examples as though they existed prior to and serve as the foundation for modern Western understandings of gender variability. This implication makes it difficult for Western scholars to understand how non-Western cultures view and value sex and gender in their own societies in both the present day and historically.

=== South Asia ===
Many transfeminine activists in Indian communities reject being considered as a third gender. In some communities, it's a term that is assigned to trans women even if they do not consider themselves a third gender.

== See also ==
- Ardhanarishvara
- Gender variance
- Intersex
- List of transgender-related topics
- Non-binary gender
- Sexual norm
- Sexuality and gender identity-based cultures
- Transphobia
- saso people
