= Runiz-e Sofla =

Village in Fars province, Iran

Runiz-e Sofla Persian: رونیز سفلی
- Village
- Location within Iran
- Coordinates: 29°12′15″N 53°40′16″E
- Country: Iran
- Province: Fars
- County: Estahban
- District: Runiz
- Rural District: Runiz

Population (2016)
  - Total: 1,880
- Time zone: UTC+3:30 (IRST)

Runiz-e Sofla (Persian: رونیز سفلی) (Note: Also romanized as Rūnīz-e Soflá; also known as Deh Pāīn, Deh-e Pā’īn, Rownīz-e Pā’īn, and Rūnīz-e Pā’īn) is a village in Runiz Rural District of Runiz District, Estahban County, Fars province, Iran.

== Demographics ==
=== Population ===
At the time of the 2006 National Census, the village's population was 2,067 in 500 households. The following census in 2011 counted 1,905 people in 531 households. The 2016 census measured the population of the village as 1,880 people in 567 households. It was the most populous village in its rural district.
