= Dehuyeh, Runiz =

Dehuyeh دهويه
- Village
- Location within Iran
- Coordinates: 29°11′21″N 53°43′33″E
- Country: Iran
- Province: Fars
- County: Estahban
- Bakhsh: Runiz
- Rural District: Runiz

Population (2006)
  - Total: 604
- Time zone: UTC+3:30 (IRST)
  - Summer (DST): UTC+4:30 (IRDT)

Dehuyeh (Persian: دهويه, also Romanized as Dehūyeh; also known as Dehūyeh-ye Rūnīz) is a village in Runiz Rural District, Runiz District, Estahban County, Fars province, Iran. At the 2006 census, its population was 604, in 149 families.
