= Mobarakabad, Estahban =

Mobarakabad مبارک‌آباد
- Village
- Location within Iran
- Coordinates: 29°15′02″N 53°57′03″E
- Country: Iran
- Province: Fars
- County: Estahban
- Bakhsh: Runiz
- Rural District: Khir

Population (2006)
  - Total: 912
- Time zone: UTC+3:30 (IRST)
  - Summer (DST): UTC+4:30 (IRDT)

Mobarakabad (Persian: مبارک‌آباد, also Romanized as Mobārakābād; also known as Khīr and Mubārakābād) is a village in Khir Rural District, Runiz District, Estahban County, Fars province, Iran. At the 2006 census, its population was 912, in 210 families.
