= Lay-e Khorrami =

Lay-e Khorrami لاي خرمي
- Village
- Location within Iran
- Coordinates: 29°12′29″N 53°51′52″E
- Country: Iran
- Province: Fars
- County: Estahban
- Bakhsh: Runiz
- Rural District: Khir

Population (2006)
  - Total: 41
- Time zone: UTC+3:30 (IRST)
  - Summer (DST): UTC+4:30 (IRDT)

Lay-e Khorrami (Persian: لاي خرمي, also Romanized as Lāy-e Khorramī; also known as Lā-ye Khorramī) is a village in Khir Rural District, Runiz District, Estahban County, Fars province, Iran. At the 2006 census, its population was 41, in 12 families.
