= Sahlabad, Estahban =

Village in Fars province, Iran

Sahlabad Persian: سهل‌آباد
- Village
- Location within Iran
- Coordinates: 29°15′28″N 53°53′44″E
- Country: Iran
- Province: Fars
- County: Estahban
- District: Runiz
- Rural District: Khir

Population (2016)
  - Total: 1,882
- Time zone: UTC+3:30 (IRST)

Sahlabad (Persian: سهل‌آباد) (Note: Also romanized as Sahlābād; also known as Sālehābād) is a village in Khir Rural District of Runiz District, Estahban County, Fars province, Iran.

== Demographics ==
=== Population ===
At the time of the 2006 National Census, the village's population was 1,908 in 444 households. The following census in 2011 counted 1,790 people in 533 households. The 2016 census measured the population of the village as 1,882 people in 596 households. It was the most populous village in its rural district.
