= Gordeh, Fars =

Gordeh گرده
- Village
- Location within Iran
- Coordinates: 29°09′44″N 53°52′54″E
- Country: Iran
- Province: Fars
- County: Estahban
- Bakhsh: Runiz
- Rural District: Runiz

Population (2006)
  - Total: 1,748
- Time zone: UTC+3:30 (IRST)
  - Summer (DST): UTC+4:30 (IRDT)

Gordeh (Persian: گرده; also known as Ardāl, Qal‘eh Gerdeh, and Qal’eh-ye Gordeh) is a village in Runiz Rural District, Runiz District, Estahban County, Fars province, Iran. At the 2006 census, its population was 1,748, in 414 families.
