= Banavan, Fars =

Banavan بنوان
- Village
- Location within Iran
- Coordinates: 29°15′45″N 53°55′25″E
- Country: Iran
- Province: Fars
- County: Estahban
- Bakhsh: Runiz
- Rural District: Khir

Population (2006)
  - Total: 1,695
- Time zone: UTC+3:30 (IRST)
  - Summer (DST): UTC+4:30 (IRDT)

Banavan (Persian: بنوان, also Romanized as Banavān and Banvān; also known as Khir, and Qal‘eh-i-Banaven) is a village in Khir Rural District, Roniz District, Estahban County, Fars province, Iran. At the 2006 census, its population was 1,695, in 427 families.
