= Mah Farrokhan =

Village in Fars province, Iran

Mah Farrokhan Persian: ماه فرخان
- Village
- Location within Iran
- Coordinates: 29°13′54″N 53°54′34″E
- Country: Iran
- Province: Fars
- County: Estahban
- District: Runiz
- Rural District: Khir

Population (2016)
  - Total: 1,880
- Time zone: UTC+3:30 (IRST)

Mah Farrokhan (Persian: ماه فرخان) (Note: Also romanized as Māh Farrokhān; also known as Māhfar Khān and Mofanghān) is a village in, and the capital of, Khir Rural District of Runiz District, Estahban County, Fars province, Iran.

== Demographics ==
=== Population ===
At the time of the 2006 National Census, the village's population was 1,718 in 400 households. The following census in 2011 counted 1,756 people in 503 households. The 2016 census measured the population of the village as 1,880 people in 588 households.
