= Darb Qaleh =

Village in Fars province, Iran

Darb Qaleh Persian: درب قلعه
- Village
- Location within Iran
- Coordinates: 28°56′40″N 54°22′27″E
- Country: Iran
- Province: Fars
- County: Estahban
- District: Central
- Rural District: Ij

Population (2016)
  - Total: 1,122
- Time zone: UTC+3:30 (IRST)

Darb Qaleh (Persian: درب قلعه) (Note: Also romanized as Darb Qal‘eh; also known as Dar Qal‘eh, Darqal‘eh, and Dow Qal‘eh) is a village in Ij Rural District of the Central District of Estahban County, Fars province, Iran.

== Demographics ==
=== Population ===
At the time of the 2006 National Census, the village's population was 1,223 in 275 households. The following census in 2011 counted 1,144 people in 322 households. The 2016 census measured the population of the village as 1,122 people in 364 households. It was the most populous village in its rural district.
