= Bard-e Now =

Bard-e Now بردنو
- Village
- Location within Iran
- Coordinates: 28°53′03″N 54°23′23″E
- Country: Iran
- Province: Fars
- County: Darab
- Bakhsh: Central
- Rural District: Ij

Population (2006)
  - Total: 212
- Time zone: UTC+3:30 (IRST)
  - Summer (DST): UTC+4:30 (IRDT)

Bard-e Now (Persian: بردنو; also known as Bardūnow) is a village in Ij Rural District, in the Central District of Darab, Fars province, Iran. At the 2006 census, its population was 212, in 55 families.
