= Khorrami (disambiguation) =

Khorrami is a village in Iran. Khorrami, Khurami or Khorami may also refer to

- Khorrami (surname)
- Khorrami Rural District in Iran
- Lay-e Khorrami, a village in Iran
