= Dehuiyeh, Khir =

Dehuiyeh دهويه
- Village
- Location within Iran
- Coordinates: 29°15′50″N 53°56′22″E
- Country: Iran
- Province: Fars
- County: Estahban
- Bakhsh: Runiz
- Rural District: Khir

Population (2006)
  - Total: 102
- Time zone: UTC+3:30 (IRST)
  - Summer (DST): UTC+4:30 (IRDT)

Dehuiyeh (Persian: دهويه, also Romanized as Dehū‘īyeh, Dehūyeh, and Dehvieh; also known as Dehū and Qal‘eh-ye Dohū) is a village in Khir Rural District, Runiz District, Estahban County, Fars province, Iran. At the 2006 census, its population was 102, in 26 families.
