= Pol-e Shekasteh =

Pol-e Shekasteh or Pol Shekasteh (Persian: پل شكسته) may refer to:

- Pol Shekasteh, Fars
- Pol-e Shekasteh, Asadabad, Hamadan Province
- Pol Shekasteh, Hamadan
