= Tuwai (surname) =

Tuwai is a surname. Notable people with the surname include:

- Adi Tuwai (born 1998), Fijian footballer
- Isoa Tuwai (born 2002), Fijian rugby union player
- Jerry Tuwai (born 1989), Fijian rugby union player
- Pio Tuwai (born 1983), Fijian rugby union player

== See also ==
- Ṭuwais (632–711), an Arab singer and teacher
- Tuwai (hapū), Māori iwi of northern Hawke's Bay
