= Mukhannath =

Ambiguous gender in classic Arab culture

Mukhannath (مُخَنَّث; plural mukhannathun (مُخَنَّثون); "effeminate ones", "ones who resemble women") was a term used in Classical Arabic and Islamic literature to describe effeminate men or people with ambiguous sexual characteristics, who appeared feminine and functioned sexually or socially in roles typically carried out by women. Mukhannathun, especially those in the city of Medina, are mentioned throughout the ḥadīth literature and in the works of many early Arabic and Muslim writers. The historical role and gender identity of mukhannathun have been interpreted by predominantly Western academics of gender studies, Islamic studies, and social sciences as an ancient antecedent to the concept of transgender women in pre-modern Islamic societies.

During the Rashidun era and first half of the Umayyad era, they were strongly associated with music and entertainment. During the Abbasid era, the word itself was used as a descriptor for men employed as dancers, musicians, and/or comedians. In later eras, the term mukhannath was associated with the receptive partner in gay sexual practices, an association that has persisted into the modern day. Khanith is a vernacular Arabic term used in some parts of the Arabian Peninsula to denote the gender role ascribed to males and occasionally intersex people who function sexually, and in some ways socially, as women.

== Etymology ==
The origins of the term mukhannath in Classical Arabic are disputed. The 8th-century Arab lexicographer al-Khalīl ibn Aḥmad al-Farāhīdī connected the etymology of the term mukhannath to khuntha, meaning "hermaphrodite"/"intersex". According to the 9th-century Arab lexicographer Abū ʿUbayd al-Qāsim ibn Sallām, the term mukhannath instead derives from the Arabic verb khanatha, meaning "to fold back the mouth of a waterskin for drinking", indicating some measure of being languid or delicate. This definition attained prominence among Islamic scholars until medieval times, when the term came to be associated with passive homosexuality.

== Mentions in the ḥadīth literature ==
Mukhannathun already existed in pre-Islamic Arabia, during the time of the Islamic prophet Muhammad, and early Islamic eras. A number of ḥadīth reports indicate that mukhannathun were used as male servants for wealthy women in the early days of Islam, due to the belief that they were not sexually interested in the female body. These sources do not state that the mukhannathun were homosexual, only that they "lack desire". According to the Iranian social scientist Mehrdad Alipour, "in the premodern period, Muslim societies were aware of five manifestations of gender ambiguity: This can be seen through figures such as the khasi (eunuch), the hijra, the mukhannath, the mamsuh, and the khuntha (hermaphrodite/intersex)."

Gender specialists Aisya Aymanee M. Zaharin and Maria Pallotta-Chiarolli have noted the agreement of scholarly sources on the appearance in the ḥadīth literature of the term mukhannath to mean people who are "obviously male" but carry themselves with femininity in their movements, appearance and vocal characteristics, and on the term's existence as a category distinct from khuntha, intersex individuals who could be either male or female. They also note the contrast between the Arabic term mukhannith, for transgender women that wish to change their biological sex, and mukhannath, which does not carry the same implication. (Note: "Various academics such as Alipour (2017) and Rowson (1991) point to references in the ḥadīth literature to the existence of mukhannath: a man who carries femininity in his movements, in his appearance, and in the softness of his voice. The Arabic term for a transgender woman is mukhannith, as they want to change their biological sex characteristics, while the mukhannath presumably do not/have not. The mukhannath or effeminate man is obviously male, but naturally behaves like a female, unlike the khuntha, an intersex person, who could be either male or female.")

Various ḥadīth reports state that Muhammad cursed the mukhannathun and their female equivalents, mutarajjilat, and ordered his followers to remove them from their homes. One such incident in the ḥadīth was prompted by a mukhannath servant of Muhammad's wife Umm Salama commenting upon the body of a woman, which may have convinced Muhammad that the mukhannathun were only pretending to have no interest in women, and therefore could not be trusted around them.

Early Islamic historiographical works rarely comment upon the habits of the mukhannathun. It seems there may have been some variance in how "effeminate" they were, though there are indications that some adopted aspects of feminine dress or at least ornamentation. One hadith states that a Muslim mukhannath who had dyed his hands and feet with henna (traditionally a feminine activity) was banished from Medina, but not killed for his behavior. Other ḥadīth also mention the punishment of banishment, both in connection with Umm Salama's servant and a man who worked as a musician. Muhammad described the musician as a mukhannath and threatened to banish him if he did not end his unacceptable career.

== Role in later eras ==
In the Rashidun and Umayyad caliphates, various mukhannathun of Medina established themselves as celebrated singers and musicians. One particularly prominent mukhannath, Abū ʿAbd al-Munʿim ʿĪsā ibn ʿAbd Allāh al-Dhāʾib, who had the Arabic name Ṭuways ("Little Peacock"), was born in Medina on the day Muhammad died (8 June 632).

There are few Islamic literary sources that describe why Ṭuways was labeled a mukhannath or what behavior of his was considered effeminate by his contemporaries. No sources describe his sexuality as immoral or imply that he was attracted to men, and he is reported to have married a woman and fathered several children in his later life. While he is described as irreligious or even frivolous towards religion in many sources, others contradict this and portray him as a believing Muslim instead. His main association with the label mukhannath seems to come from his profession, as music was mainly performed by women in pre-Islamic Arabia. Ṭuways is described as the first mukhannath to perform "perfect singing" characterized by definitive rhythmic patterns in Medina. He was also known for his sharp wit and his skill with the tambourine, which had previously been associated only with female musicians.

Some modern scholars of Islamic studies believe that Ṭuways and other mukhannathun musicians formed an intermediary stage in the social class most associated with musical performance: women in pre-Islamic Arabia, mukhannathun in the Rashidun and early Umayyad caliphates, and mainly non-mukhannath men in later time periods. While many still disapproved of the mukhannathun in general in this era, the musicians among them were nonetheless valued and prized for their skill. Some of the more well-known mukhannathun also served as go-betweens and matchmakers for men and women.

While Ṭuways is typically described as the leading mukhannath musician of Medina during his lifetime, historical sources describe others who served a similar role providing musical and poetic entertainment. A man who was known by the Arabic name al-Dalāl ("the Coquettish") is mentioned as one of Ṭuways' pupils. He is portrayed as a witty but sometimes crude man who "loved women" but did not have sex with them. Unlike Ṭuways, some tales involving al-Dalāl do suggest that he was attracted to men.

== Persecution and decline ==
While sporadic persecution of mukhannathun dates back to the time of Muhammad, their large-scale governmental persecution began in the Umayyad caliphate. According to Everett K. Rowson, professor of Middle Eastern and Islamic Studies at New York University, this may have been prompted by "a perceived connection between cross-dressing and a lack of proper religious commitment".

Some Islamic literary sources associate the beginning of severe persecution with Marwān I ibn al-Ḥakam, fourth caliph of the Umayyad caliphate, and his brother Yaḥyā, who served as a governor under the caliph ʿAbd al-Malik ibn Marwān, while other sources put it in the time of ʿAbd al-Malik's son, al-Walīd I ibn ʿAbd al-Malik. The governor of Mecca serving under al-Walīd I is said to have "issued a proclamation against the mukhannathun", in addition to other singers and drinkers of wine. Two mukhannathun musicians named Ibn Surayj and al-Gharīḍ are specifically referred to as being impacted by this proclamation, with al-Gharīḍ fleeing to Yemen and never returning. Like al-Dalāl, al-Gharīḍ is portrayed as not just "effeminate" but homosexual in some sources. Beyond these two singers, relatively little is known of the mukhannathun of Mecca, compared to the more well-known group in Medina.

The most severe instance of persecution is typically dated to the time of al-Walīd I's brother and successor Sulaymān ibn ʿAbd al-Malik, seventh caliph of the Umayyad caliphate. According to several variants of this story, the caliph ordered the full castration of the mukhannathun of Medina. Some versions of the tale say that all of them were forced to undergo the procedure, while others state that only a few of them were; in the latter case, al-Dalāl is almost always included as one of the castrated mukhannathun.

Some variants of the story add a series of witticisms supposedly uttered by the mukhannathun prior to their castration:

Ṭuways: "This is simply a circumcision which we must undergo again."

al-Dalal: "Or rather the Greater Circumcision!"
Nasim al-Sahar ("Breeze of the Dawn"): "With castration I have become a mukhannath in truth!"
Nawmat al-Duha: "Or rather we have become women in truth!"
Bard al-Fu'ad: "We have been spared the trouble of carrying around a spout for urine."
Zillal-Shajar ("Shade Under the Trees"): "What would we do with an unused weapon, anyway?"

After this event, the mukhannathun of Medina begin to fade from historical sources, and the next generation of singers and musicians had few mukhannathun in their ranks. Rowson states that though many details of the stories of their castration were undoubtedly invented, "this silence supports the assumption that they did suffer a major blow sometime around the caliphate of Sulayman."

By the days of the Abbasid caliph al-Maʾmūn, the mukhannathun working as entertainment were now more associated with court jesters than famed musicians, and the term itself seems to have become synonymous with an individual employed as a comedian or pantomime. The Abbasid caliphs al-Maʾmūn and al-Mutawakkil employed a famed mukhannath named Abbada as an actor in comedic plays. He served as a buffoon whose act depended upon mockery and "low sexual humor", the latter of which involved the flaunting of his "passive homosexuality". These characteristics would define mukhannathun in later eras, and they never regained the relatively esteemed status they held in the early days in Medina.

== Religious opinions ==
The 8th-century Muslim scholar Ibn S̲h̲ihāb al-Zuhrī stated that one should pray behind mukhannathun only in cases of necessity. Some 13th and 14th-century scholars like al-Nawawī and al-Kirmanī classified mukhannathun into two groups: those whose feminine traits seem unchangeable, despite the person's best efforts to stop them, and those whose traits are changeable but refuse to stop.

Early Muslim scholars like Ibn Ḥajar al-ʿAsqalānī stated that all mukhannathun must make an effort to cease their feminine behavior, but if this proved impossible, they were not worthy of punishment. Those who made no effort to become less "effeminate", or seemed to "take pleasure in (his effeminacy)", were worthy of blame. By this era, mukhannath had developed its association with homosexuality, and Badr al-Dīn al-ʿAynī saw passive homosexuality as "a more heinous extension of takhannuth", or effeminate behavior.

Ibn ʿAbd al-Bāŕr stated that mukhannathun in his era were "known to be promiscuous", and resembled women in "softness, speech, appearance, accent and thinking". These mukhannathun were the ones initially allowed to be the servants of women, as they did not demonstrate any physical attraction to the female body.

== Modern views ==
While sometimes classified as transgender individuals, mukhannathun as a group do not fit neatly into any one of the Western categories of gender or sexuality used by the LGBT community. Although they were probably not predominantly cisgender or heterosexual, it cannot be said that they were simply either homosexual males or transgender women. There was too much variety between one mukhannath and the next to determine a specific label for their gender or sexual identity, and the term's meaning changed over time. Western scholars Aisya Aymanee M. Zaharin and Maria Pallotta-Chiarolli view the term mukhannath as referring to men who are "obviously male" and behave like women, but do not want to undergo sex reassignment surgery, in contrast to transgender or intersex people.

In the late 1980s, Muhammad Sayyid Tantawi of Egypt issued a fatwa supporting the right for those who fit the description of mukhannathun to have sex reassignment surgery; Tantawy seems to have associated the mukhannathun with the concept of hermaphroditism or intersex individuals. Ruhollah Khomeini of Iran issued similar fatwas around the same time. Khomeini's initial fatwa concerned intersex individuals as well, but he later specified that sex reassignment surgery was also permissible in the case of transgender individuals. Because homosexuality is illegal in Iran but gender transition is legal, some gay individuals have been forced to undergo sex reassignment surgery and transition into the opposite sex, regardless of their actual gender identity. Due to Khomeini's fatwas allowing sex reassignment surgery for intersex and transgender individuals, It is sanctioned as a supposed "cure" for homosexuality, which is punishable by death penalty under Iranian law. The Iranian government even provides up to half the cost for those needing financial assistance and a sex change is recognised on the birth certificate.

In some regions of South Asia such as India, Bangladesh, and Pakistan, the hijras are officially recognized as a third gender that is neither male nor female, a concept that some have compared to mukhannathun, or mustarjil.

== See also ==
- Hijra
- Khanith
- Third gender
- Transgender rights in Iran
- Transgender rights in Pakistan
- Transgender rights in Syria
- Transgender rights in Turkey
- Two-Spirit

== Bibliography ==
- Rehman, Javaid; Polymenopoulou, Eleni (2013). "Is Green a Part of the Rainbow? Sharia, Homosexuality, and LGBT Rights in the Muslim World" (PDF). Fordham International Law Journal. 37 (1). Fordham University School of Law: 1–53. ISSN 0747-9395. OCLC 52769025. Archived from the original on 21 July 2018.
- Schmidtke, Sabine (June 1999). "Homoeroticism and Homosexuality in Islam: A Review Article". Bulletin of the School of Oriental and African Studies. 62 (2). Cambridge and New York: Cambridge University Press on behalf of the School of Oriental and African Studies (University of London): 260–266. doi:10.1017/S0041977X00016700. eISSN 1474-0699. ISSN 0041-977X. JSTOR 3107489. S2CID 170880292.
