= Årdal Church =

Årdal Church may refer to:

- Årdal Church (Agder), a church in Bygland municipality in Agder county, Norway
- Årdal Church (Rogaland), a church in Hjelmeland municipality, Rogaland county, Norway
- Old Årdal Church, a church in Hjelmeland municipality, Rogaland county, Norway
- Årdal Church (Vestland), a church in Årdal municipality, Vestland county, Norway

== See also ==
- Årdal (disambiguation)
- Ardal (disambiguation)
