= Årdal =

Årdal or Aardal may also refer to:

== People ==
- Asgeir Årdal (born 1983), a Norwegian cross-country skier
- Hans Aardal (1921-1995), a Norwegian politician for the Conservative Party
- Karen Aardal (born 1961), Norwegian and Dutch applied mathematician

== Places ==
- Årdal Municipality, a municipality in Vestland county, Norway
- Årdal Municipality (Rogaland), a former municipality in Rogaland county, Norway
- Øvre Årdal, a village within Årdal municipality, Vestland county, Norway
- Årdal, Hjelmeland, a village in Hjelmeland municipality, Rogaland county, Norway

== Other uses ==
- Årdal FK, a Norwegian football club based in Årdal municipality, Sogn og Fjordane county, Norway

== See also ==
- Årdal Church (disambiguation)
- Ardal (disambiguation)
