= Dehuyeh, Estahban =

Dehuyeh دهويه
- Village
- Location within Iran
- Coordinates: 28°58′11″N 54°23′20″E
- Country: Iran
- Province: Fars
- County: Estahban
- Bakhsh: Central
- Rural District: Ij

Population (2006)
  - Total: 462
- Time zone: UTC+3:30 (IRST)
  - Summer (DST): UTC+4:30 (IRDT)

Dehuyeh (Persian: دهويه, also Romanized as Dehūyeh and Dehvieh; also known as Dehū and Dohū) is a village in Ij Rural District, in the Central District of Estahban County, Fars province, Iran. At the 2006 census, its population was 462, in 103 families.
