= Kafarha Castle =

Castle in Fars province, Iran

Kafarha castle
- قلعه کافرها

General information
- Type: Castle
- Location: Estahban County, Iran

Kafarha castle (Persian: قلعه کافرها) is a historical castle located in Estahban County in Fars province, The longevity of this fortress dates back to the Middle Ages Historical periods after Islam.
