= 1849 in Iran =

- Decades
- See also: Other events of 1849; Years in Iran

The following lists events that happened during 1849 in Qajar era.

== Incumbents ==
- Monarch: Naser al-Din Shah Qajar

== Births ==
- January 6 – Nezam Al Olama Estahbanati, Islamic jurist and scholar.
- ? – Taj ol-Molouk, Royal consort.

== Deaths ==
- ? – Báb, founder of Bábism and, according to the Baháʼís, predecessor of Baháʼu'lláh.
- ? – Haji Mirza Aqasi, Iranian politician.
