= Adud al-Din al-Iji =

Islamic judge and theologian

Imam Aḍud al-Din al-Ījī عضد الدين الإيجي
- Title: Aḍud al-Din

Personal life
- Born: 1281 Ij near Shiraz
- Died: 1356 (aged 74–75) Somewhere near Ij
- Era: Medieval era
- Region: Persia
- Notable work(s): Al-Mawāqif fī 'ilm al-kalām Al-Akhlaq al-Adudiyya; Aqaid al-Adudiyya
- Occupation: Scholar, Theologian, Judge, Jurist, Legal theoretician, Linguist, Rhetorician

Religious life
- Religion: Islam
- Denomination: Sunni
- Jurisprudence: Shafi'i
- Creed: Ash'ari

Muslim leader
- Influenced by: Al-Shafi'i Abu Hasan al-Ash'ari Fakhr al-Din al-Razi Sayf al-Din al-Amidi Ibn al-Hajib Qutb al-Din al-Shirazi Al-Baydawi
- Influenced: Al-Taftazani Al-Sharif al-Jurjani Shams al-Din al-Kirmani

Abū al-Faḍl Aḍud al-Din 'Abd al-Raḥman b. Aḥmad b. Abd al-Ghaffar al-Ījī (1281–1356), better known as Aḍud al-Din al-Ījī (Arabic: عضد الدين الإيجي) was an Islamic scholar from the Ilkhanate period. He was an influential judge, Shafi'i jurist, legal theoretician, linguist, rhetorician and is considered the leading Ash'arite theologian of his time.

== Lineage ==
He was a descendant of a family which traced its genealogy back to the first caliph Abū Bakr.

== Early life ==
=== Birth ===
He was born in a town called Īj near Shiraz, located in the Fars province in the year of 680 AH/1281 AD.

=== Education ===
During his early years, al-Ījī moved to Tabriz and studied grammar and the rational sciences under Fakr al-Din al-Jarbadadi, a pupil of the distinguished scholar, al-Baydawi. Additionally, al-Ījī studied under Qutb al-Din al-Shirazi, who was a prominent pupil of Nasir al-Din al-Tusi. It is also documented that, as a young man, he studied philosophy at Sultaniyya, the Ikhanid capital, with the vizier Rashid al-Din Hamadani as his sponsor.

== Scholarly life ==
=== Scholastic specialization ===
Aḍud al-Din al-Ījī was primarily known for his contributions to theology despite this, he was noted to be well-versed in several academic fields. He specialized in Islamic jurisprudence and given his title, Shaykh al-Shafi'iyya of Persia, it was evident that he was the foremost Shafi'i jurist of the Ilkhanate realm during that period. Al-Suyuti in his famous biographical dictionary Bughyat al-Wuʻāh fī Ṭabaqāt al-Lughawīyīn wa-al-Nuḥāh counted al-Ījī as among the scholars of Arabic science and recognized his eminence in having extensive knowledge on the principles and meanings in the Arabic language. He was proficient in Quranic exegesis and excelled in the rational sciences, such as legal theory, kalam, logic and Islamic philosophy. He was a highly skilled debater and dialectician who mastered the arts of disputation. He was known for his scrutinization, research skills and meticulousness.

=== Career ===
When he was younger, he attempted to pursue a career at the court of the Il-khanids, the Mongol dynasty that ruled Iran in Tabriz. He was successful in gaining the respect of the influential vizier, Rashid al-Din Hamadani, who was a Jew who had converted to Islam when the Mongols themselves eventually abandoned their inherited beliefs in Shamanism or Buddhism. Al-Ījī was a Sunni, therefore his status may have been in jeopardy when Öljaitü converted to Shiism in 1310. Nevertheless, it has been reported al-Ījī served as the judge in Sultaniyya and Rashīd al-Dīn offered him a teaching position at a mobile "university" that accompanied the Il-khanid monarch Öljaitü throughout his expeditions. Eventually, he appears to have settled back in Shābankārah, where he was left to manage substantial lands that protected his family's riches in the form of a charitable trust (waqf) following the death of his father in 1317. Al-Ījī broke off his ties to the court after Rashīd al-Dīn was put to death in 1318 and didn't re-establish them until Ghiyāth al-Dīn, his son, succeeded his father as vizierate in 1327 and rose to the position of chief judge of the empire. But when the Ilkhanate dynasty came to an end in 1335, he relocated to Shiraz, where he was given protection by the provincial ruler Abū Isḥāq Injü and rose to the position of chief judge in the town. Despite his reduced salary, he relished the ambiance of an art-loving court and the companionship of poets like Hafez.

=== Students ===
He produced great students who became horizons as described by biographers:

- Sa'ad al-Din al-Taftazani
- Al-Sharif al-Jurjani
- Shams al-Din al-Kirmani
- Diya' al-Din al-Afifi

== Death ==
After nearly two decades of this peaceful period, al-Ījī's patron was ousted from Shiraz in 1354 by Mubāriz al-Dīn, a rival monarch whose domain also included Shābankārah. Consequently, al-Ījī wisely established secret ties with a new ally and made his way back to his hometown just before Shiraz was apprehended. But no one overlooked his betrayal. He was imprisoned in a fortress near Īj and died there in 1356, presumably at the instigation of a former follower of Abū Isḥāq Injü.

== Legacy ==
After al-Ghazali, Aḍud al-Din al-Ījī finally rose to prominence as one of the key thinkers of what might be referred to as the post-classical (Muta'akhirin) era of Islamic thinking. One of the key features of al-Ījī's work is his verification ability, or "Tahqiq." Verification was an academic discipline in which previous Islamic literature was re-examined and commentaries were composed to determine whether the theological content of those earlier works could withstand the critical examination of logical arguments made in the subject of Islamic philosophy.Al-Mawaqif fi 'ilm al-Kalam, the text on Islamic theology that al-Ījī wrote, is his most enduring contribution. Although he wrote several texts in a variety of fields such as legal hermeneutics, grammar (usul al-Din, Usul al-Fiqh, and Usul al-Lugha), and trivium philosophical theology, his two most renowned students, Sayyid Sharif al-Jurjani and Sa'ad al-Din al-Taftazani, wrote insightful commentary on this work, ensuring that the framework established by kitab al-Mawaqif would become fundamental to Sunni theology for centuries to come. Al-Ījī's theological views are considered the final image of the Ash`ari thought, which did not receive any renewal or addition after him.

al-Akhlaq al-Adudiyya is one of Al-Ījī's other works that, although not considered theological classics, had a major influence on the study of moral philosophy in the Islamic world.

== Works ==
Al-Ījī was a prolific writer who covered several fields including scholastic theology, jurisprudence (according to the Shāfiʿī school), Qurʾanic exegesis, rhetoric and dialectics, ethics, and, to some extent, historiography. Their widespread appeal is demonstrated by the abundance of commentary on them. Some of the works are still used today in religious universities such as al-Azhar in Cairo.

- Al-Mawaqif fi 'ilm al-Kalam ("Stations of the Discipline of Kalām"), is a multivolume work on the discipline of theology (kalam). The book sets out in the style of a summa theologica, in concise language, the traditional ideas of late Asḥʿarite theology; it is based mainly on the Moḥaṣṣal of Fakhr al-Din al-Razi and the Abkār al-Afkār of Sayf al-Din al-Amidi.
- Al-Akhlaq al-Adudiyya, a book on moral philosophy.
- Aqaid al-Adudiyya ("Creed of al-Adudiyya"), a famous treatise on the Ash'ari creed according to the author.
- Jawahir al-Kalam ("Jewels of Kalam")
- Sharh Mukhtasar al-Muntaha, a book on jurisprudential principles and it is considered one of the best commentaries of Mukhtaṣar al-Muntahá al-uṣūlī by Ibn al-Hajib
- Taḥqīq al-tafsīr fī takṯīr al-tanwīr, it's a commentary on Anwar al-Tanzil wa-Asrar al-Ta'wil by al-Baydawi.
- Al- Fawāʾed al-ḡīāṯīya, a book on rhetoric.
- Ādāb al-baḥṯ ("Ethics of discussion")
- Ešrāq al-tawārīḵ, a treatise on the history of religion.

== See also ==
- List of Ash'aris
- List of Muslim theologians

== Bibliography ==
- Oliver Leaman (2006). The Biographical Encyclopaedia of Islamic Philosophy. Oxford University Press. ISBN 9780199754731.
