= Ardal (disambiguation) =

Ardal is a city in Chaharmahal and Bakhtiari Province, Iran.

Ardal (Persian: اردل) may also refer to:

- Ardal, Fars
- Ardal, Isfahan
- Ardal County, in Chaharmahal and Bakhtiari Province
- Ardal O'Hanlon (born 1965), Irish actor and comedian
- Ardal Leagues, Welsh football league

== See also ==
- Årdal (disambiguation)
