= Runiz =

City in Fars province, Iran

Runiz Persian: رونيز
- City
- Location within Iran
- Coordinates: 29°11′33″N 53°46′08″E
- Country: Iran
- Province: Fars
- County: Estahban
- District: Runiz

Population (2016)
  - Total: 5,760
- Time zone: UTC+3:30 (IRST)

Runiz (Persian: رونيز) (Note: Also romanized as Rūnīz; also known as Rownīz-e Bālā, Rownīz-e ‘Olyā, Rūnīz Bala, and Rūnīz-e Bālā (English: Upper Runiz)) is a city in, and the capital of, Runiz District of Estahban County, Fars province, Iran. It also serves as the administrative center for Runiz Rural District.

== Demographics ==
=== Population ===
At the time of the 2006 National Census, the city's population was 5,991 in 1,466 households. The following census in 2011 counted 5,593 people in 1,564 households. The 2016 census measured the population of the city as 5,760 people in 1,764 households.

== Notable people ==
- Murzh Hasan, author (1767–1821)
