= Khanith =

Males who function socially and sexually as women in Arabia

Khanith (also spelled Khaneeth or referred to as Xanith; Arabic: خنيث, romanized: khanīth) is a term originating from the Arabian Peninsula to denote a person assigned male at birth who occupies an intermediate "third gender" between male and female. Their mannerisms and behaviors fall between the socially constructed roles for men and women.

== Dress ==
Khanith individuals wear clothing that blends elements of both traditional men's and women's styles. They typically wear the ankle-length tunic associated with men, but cinch it tightly around their waist in a manner more typical of women's fashion. While men usually dress in plain white garments and women in brightly colored, patterned attire, khanith opt for unpatterned, colored clothing. Hairstyles also reflect this blend. Where men keep their hair short, women wear it long, and khanith maintain it at a medium length. Men tend to comb their hair straight back, women style it diagonally from a center parting, whereas khanith comb theirs forward from a side parting and oil it similarly to women.

== Rights and social liberties ==
As khanith individuals are assigned male at birth, maintain their male genitalia, and have masculine names that are used with masculine grammatical gender forms, khanith individuals have all the same rights as a man under Islamic jurisprudence. They are allowed to worship in mosques with men, and can move freely outside of their homes. However, because khanith are not considered men socially, they are not allowed to sit down in public or play instruments that are associated with men.

Further, in Omani society, men and women are strictly segregated and women are secluded under purdah. As khanith is an intermediate gender, with their appearance judged by feminine beauty standards, they are classed with women in many social aspects. They are allowed to visit women and walk with them in the street, unlike men. They also perform tasks culturally associated with women such as cooking and housekeeping. Additionally, during festive occasions, khanith participate alongside women in singing and dancing. They may also serve as matchmakers, facilitating connections between men and women. Notably, they hold a unique cultural role: only khanith, never other men, are permitted to see a bride's face on her wedding night.

== Sexual intercourse ==
In Oman, one of the key distinctions between men and women lies in the sexual roles they are expected to play. Men are seen as active, penetrative participants in sexual intercourse, while women, and khanith, are regarded as passive recipients. Because khanith do not embody the active sexual role, they are not considered men within this cultural framework.

At the heart of this distinction is a societal definition of masculinity that centers on sexual potency, particularly as demonstrated through marriage. A man's status is validated not only by his ability to marry, but by publicly proving his sexual performance. On the morning after a wedding, this is typically confirmed by displaying a blood-stained handkerchief, indicating the bride's virginity has been taken. This act serves as a public testament to the groom's potency and confirms his identity as a man.

However, this definition also allows khanith individuals to become a man socially. A khanith can be recognized as a man if he marries and fulfills the same expectations. Should he successfully consummate the marriage and provide the expected proof of his sexual role as penetrator, he is then reclassified as a man. In this context, masculinity is defined not by gender identity or expression, but primarily through penetrative sexual performance.

== Westernization ==
Much of the early scholarly work on khanith identity was done by professor Unni Wikan in her seminal work Behind the Veil in Arabia: Women in Oman. This text was one of the first to identify khanith individuals, or xanith as Wikan referenced them, as legitimate third-gendered persons within Omani society. However, despite this important research, many of the methodologies used to study and contextualize khanith were within a western framework.

Transsexualism and homosexuality were used to contextualize khanith individuals, however both of these terms impose a strict binary on sexual and gender preference that is predominately Western. As khanith does not fall within a binary as an social construction, these terms are epistemologically damaging to the study of khanith as a whole.

== Etymology ==
The term stems from the Arabian Peninsula, primarily in Oman and the United Arab Emirates. It contains the same root as "mukhannathun" (Arabic: مخنث, romanized: mukhannath), meaning "effeminate".

== See also ==
- Khawal
- LGBT in the Middle East
- List of transgender-related topics
- List of LGBT slang terms

== Bibliography ==
- Roscoe, Will; Murray, Stephan (1997). Islamic Homosexualities: Culture, History, and Literature (illustrated ed.). New York University Press. ISBN 9780814774687.
