= Mohammad Reza Ale Ebrahim =

Iranian writer, researcher and anthropologist

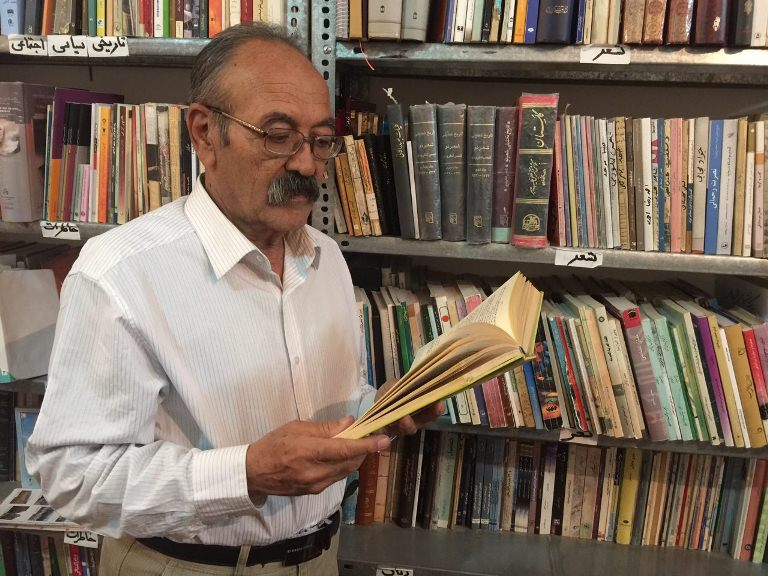

Mohammad Reza Ale Ebrahim (born 24 October 1951 in Estahban) is an Iranian writer, researcher and anthropologist. He has published more than 20 books on the culture, literature and the history of Estahban, a city in Fars province in Iran. He writes short stories in addition to conducting research on culture and the oral lore of the people of Estahban.

== Education ==
Mohammad Reza Ale Ebrahim gained his high school diploma in his hometown, Estahban and then moved to Tehran to further his studies. He holds a double B.A. in Training Sciences (management and planning) and the Persian literature from Allameh Tabataba'i University.

== Books ==
=== Biographies ===
- The Revolt, Life and Struggles of Karimpour Shirazi, Mohammad Reza Ale Ebrahim and Ali Ashraf Darvishian, Cheshmeh Publications, Tehran, 2004.
- Ghazi Azododdin Iji, Mohammad Reza Ale Ebrahim, Setahban Publications, Estahban, 2005.
- Martyr Rabe (the martyr of the Freedom Path), Mohammad Reza Ale Ebrahim, Setahban Publications, Estahban, 2005
- Sheikh Maghrebi: A Brief Review of Life and Poetry of Mohammad Shirin (Shams) Maghrebi, Mohammad Reza Ale Ebrahim, Setahban Publications, Estahban, 2005.
- Wedding Ceremony and its Popular Songs in Estahban, Mohammad Reza Ale Ebrahim, Setahban Publications, Estahban, 2007
- Estahban Folk Games, Mohammad Reza Ale Ebrahim, Setahban Publications, Estahban, 2007
- Ardashir I, the Son of Bakhtehgan, Mohammad Reza Ale Ebrahim, Setahban Publications, Estahban, 2008
- Estahban People's Culture in Muharram, Ramadan and Prayers for Rain, Mohammad Reza Ale Ebrahim, Setahban Publications, Estahban, 2008
- Ancient and Religious Monuments and Tourist Attractions in Estahban, Mohammad Reza Ale Ebrahim, Setahban Publications, Estahban, 2008
- Baharestan (the Spring of Estahban), Mohammad Reza Ale Ebrahim, Setahban Publications, Estahban, 2012

=== Folk Culture ===
- Bibliography of Estahban's People, Mohammad Reza Ale Ebrahim, Setahban Publications, Estahban, 2003.
- Estahban People's Culture in Muharram, Ramadan and Prayers for Rain, Mohammad Reza Ale Ebrahim, Setahban Publications, Estahban, 2008
- Wedding Ceremony and its Popular Songs in Estahban, Mohammad Reza Ale Ebrahim, Setahban Publications, Estahban, 2007
- Estahban Folk Games, Mohammad Reza Ale Ebrahim, Setahban Publications, Estahban, 2007
- Ancient and Religious Monuments and Tourist Attractions in Estahban, Mohammad Reza Ale Ebrahim, Setahban Publications, Estahban, 2008
- Sabonati Sayings, Mohammad Reza Ale Ebrahim (Editor), Setahban Publications, Estahban, 2015.
- Lady Teachers' Legends, Mohammad Reza Ale Ebrahim (Editor), Setahban Publications, Estahban, 2015.
- Educational Corps' Legends, Mohammad Reza Ale Ebrahim (Editor), Setahban Publications, Estahban, 2015.
- History and Geography of Estahban, Mohammad Reza Ale Ebrahim, Setahban Publications, Estahban, 2014.
- Fig and Fig Planting in Estahban, Mohammad Reza Ale Ebrahim, Setahban Publications, Estahban, 2014.
- Grape and Grape Growing in Estahban, Mohammad Reza Ale Ebrahim, Setahban Publications, Estahban, 2014.
- Almond and Saffron in Estahban, Mohammad Reza Ale Ebrahim, Setahban Publications, Estahban, 2014.
- Estahban Folklore, Mohammad Reza Ale Ebrahim, Setahban Publications, Estahban, 2014.
- Prayers and Curses in Estahban, Mohammad Reza Ale Ebrahim, Setahban Publications, Estahban, 2014.
- A Background of Theatre in Estahban, Mohammad Reza Ale Ebrahim, Setahban Publications, Estahban, 2014.
- Hidden Beheshtegan in Neyriz, Mohammad Reza Ale Ebrahim (Editor), Setahban Publications, Estahban, 2014.

=== As researcher and editor ===
- Shams Estahbanati, Mohammad Reza Ale Ebrahim (Editor), Setahban Publications, Estahban, 2006.
- Aref Estahbanati (a collection of poems by Mohammad Ali Manouchehri), Mohammad Reza Ale Ebrahim (Editor), Mohammad Ali Manouchehri (Poet), Setahban Publications, Estahban, 2006.
- Masterpiece of Love or Ashura Enthusiasm (Poems by Shams Estahbanati), Mohammad Reza Ale Ebrahim (Editor), Setahban Publications, Estahban, 2006.
- Sonnets: Shams Estahbanati, Mohammad Reza Ale Ebrahim (Editor), Setahban Publications, Estahban, 2008.
- Mahya, Darvish Keshavarzian, Mohammad Reza Ale Ebrahim (Editor), Setahban Publications, Estahban, 2008.
- Vafadar's Poems (Poetry and folk poetry collections), Mohammad Reza Ale Ebrahim (Editor), Asghar Vafadar (Poet), Setahban Publications, Estahban, 2010.
- Shams Estahbanati's Noha, Mohammad Shams Estahbanati, Mohammad Reza Ale Ebrahim (Editor), Setahban Publications, Estahban, 2012.
- Shokufeha-ye Kahkeshani (Galaxy Blossoms), Ghassem Kahkeshani, Mohammad Reza Ale Ebrahim (Editor), Setahban Publications, Estahban, 2013.
- Khubyar's Safarnama (Hajj Safarnama), Gholam Abbas Khubyar, Mohammad Reza Ale Ebrahim (Editor), Setahban Publications, Estahban, 2013.
- Breeze of Kindness (poetry collection), Mahmoud Roshan Ali, Mohammad Reza Ale Ebrahim (Editor), Setahban Publications, Estahban, 2013.
- I Love Amin Faghiri, Mohammad Reza Ale Ebrahim (Editor), Setahban Publications, Estahban, 2015.
- HeydarBeg Nami, Mohammad Reza Ale Ebrahim (Editor), Setahban Publications, Estahban, 2015.

=== Fiction ===
- Setahban Stories (Story Collection), (First Book), Mohammad Reza Ale Ebrahim (Editor), Setahban Publications, Estahban, 1997.
- Setahban Stories (Story Collection), (Second Book), Mohammad Reza Ale Ebrahim (Editor), Setahban Publications, Estahban, 1998.
- Setahban Stories (Story Collection), (Third Book), Mohammad Reza Ale Ebrahim (Editor), Setahban Publications, Estahban, 1999.
- Setahban Stories (Story Collection), (Forth Book), Mohammad Reza Ale Ebrahim (Editor), Setahban Publications, Estahban, 2000.
- Setahban Stories (Story Collection), (Fifth Book), Mohammad Reza Ale Ebrahim (Editor), Setahban Publications, Estahban, 2001.
- Setahban Stories (Story Collection), (Sixth Book), Mohammad Reza Ale Ebrahim (Editor), Setahban Publications, Estahban, 2003.
- Setahban Stories (Story Collection), (Seventh Book), Mohammad Reza Ale Ebrahim (Editor), Setahban Publications, Estahban, 2005.
- Setahban Stories (Story Collection), (Eighth Book), Mohammad Reza Ale Ebrahim (Editor), Setahban Publications, Estahban, 2007.
- Setahban Stories (9), (Exclusive Collection of the Provincial Short Story Festival) Mohammad Reza Ale Ebrahim (Editor), Setahban Publications, Estahban, 2009.
- The Sable's Night (Shabe Samour), Mohammad Reza Ale Ebrahim, Setahban Publications, Estahban, 2010.
- The Edge of the Tandoor (Lab-e Tanour), Mohammad Reza Ale Ebrahim, Setahban Publications, Estahban, 2010.
- Setahban Stories (Story Collection), (Tenth Book), Mohammad Reza Ale Ebrahim (Editor), Setahban Publications, Estahban, 2011.

=== Poetry ===
- The Rain Did Not Intend to Stop, Mohammad Reza Ale Ebrahim, Setahban Publications, Estahban, 2015.

=== Travel Memories ===
- Travel to Syria, Mohammad Reza Ale Ebrahim, Setahban Publications, Estahban, 2014.
- Travel to Shahdad, Mohammad Reza Ale Ebrahim, Setahban Publications, Estahban, 2014.
- Travel to Mashhad, Mohammad Reza Ale Ebrahim, Setahban Publications, Estahban, 2014.

=== Book Review ===
- A Review of Fifty Books, Mohammad Reza Ale Ebrahim, Setahban Publications, Estahban, 2015.
- A Review of Twenty Five Books, Mohammad Reza Ale Ebrahim, Setahban Publications, Estahban, 2015.
