= Estahban =

City in Fars province, Iran

Estahban Persian: استهبان
- City
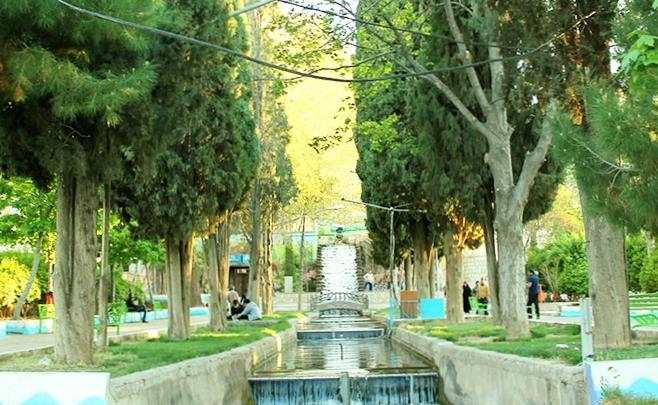

- Location within Iran
- Coordinates: 29°07′37″N 54°02′22″E
- Country: Iran
- Province: Fars
- County: Estahban
- District: Central

Population (2016)
  - Total: 36,410
- Time zone: UTC+3:30 (IRST)
- Area code: 071-53
- Website: www.estahban.ir

Estahban (Persian: استهبان and Arabic: اصطهبانات) (Note: Also romanized as Estahbān and Eşţahbān; before 1970 Eşţahbānāt, also romanized as Estehbanat, Istahbanát, Istehbānāt, and Shahr-e Eşţahbānāt; also formerly known as Savānāt. Also formerly known as Naseri, rooted in the Pahlavi word seteh and the suffix ban, which means "a place for keeping grapes") is a city in the Central District of Estahban County, Fars province, Iran, serving as capital of both the county and the district.

The area surrounding Estahban is very fertile, being the largest producer of dried figs, saffron, grain, cotton, walnuts, almonds, grapes and other fruits in the Middle East. Estahban has been the most famous provider of figs to the world. It is also one of the biggest producers of saffron.

== Demographics ==
=== Language, ethnicity, and religion ===
The majority of the people of Estahban are Persians, and they speak Persian with the Shirazi accent, not the Persian accent of Tehran. The majority in the city are Muslims.

=== Population ===
At the time of the 2006 National Census, the city's population was 33,101 in 8,714 households. The following census in 2011 counted 34,639 people in 9,730 households. The 2016 census measured the population of the city as 36,410 people in 10,970 households.

== Geography ==
Estahban is located at 29.1291° N, 54.358° E and surrounded by Bakhtagan Lake from the north, by Fars township from the south and by Shiraz and Darab from the west. Its average elevation from sea level is about 1767 m.

=== Climate ===
Estahban is a dry City, with a yearly precipitation amount of 224 millimeters, with summer temperatures frequently about 28.1 °C (104 °F) in blazing sunshine with no humidity.

== Economy ==
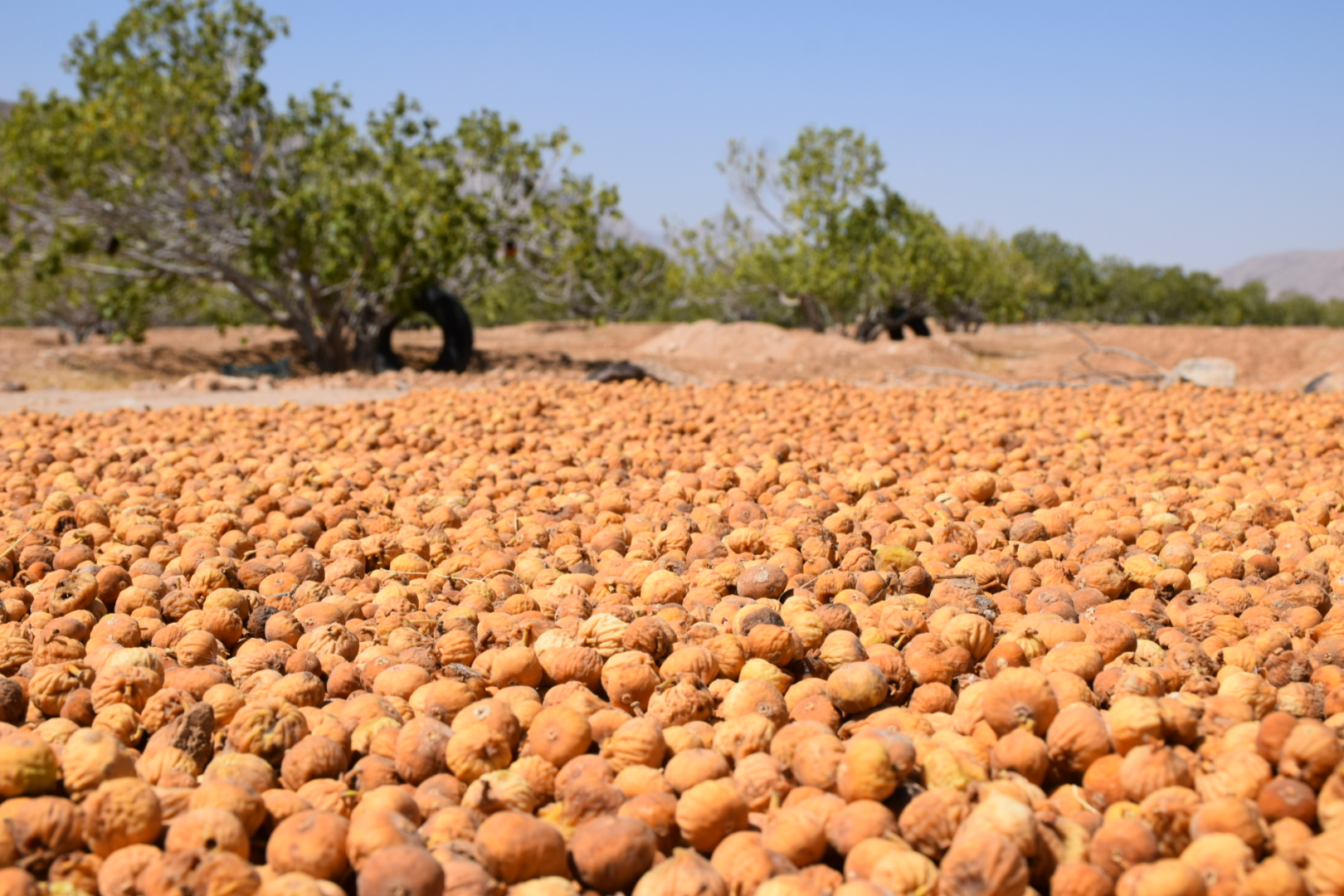
A fig garden in Estahban

Because of fertile soil, economy in Estahban is mostly based on agriculture and consequently significant portion of population is employed in agriculture industries. Estahban dried figs are exported all over the world.

=== Dried figs ===
The fig is characterized by rain-fed organic cultivation, natural tree-drying, and a high sugar content.

There is no process for drying this product. Figs become dried by sun lights on the tree and then fall on the earth. Farmers collect them to warehouse to classify them.

== Notable people ==
- Mohammad Reza Ale Ebrahim
- Nezam Al Olama Estahbanati
- Nezameddin Faghih
