= Nezam Al Olama Estahbanati =

Islamic jurist and scholar

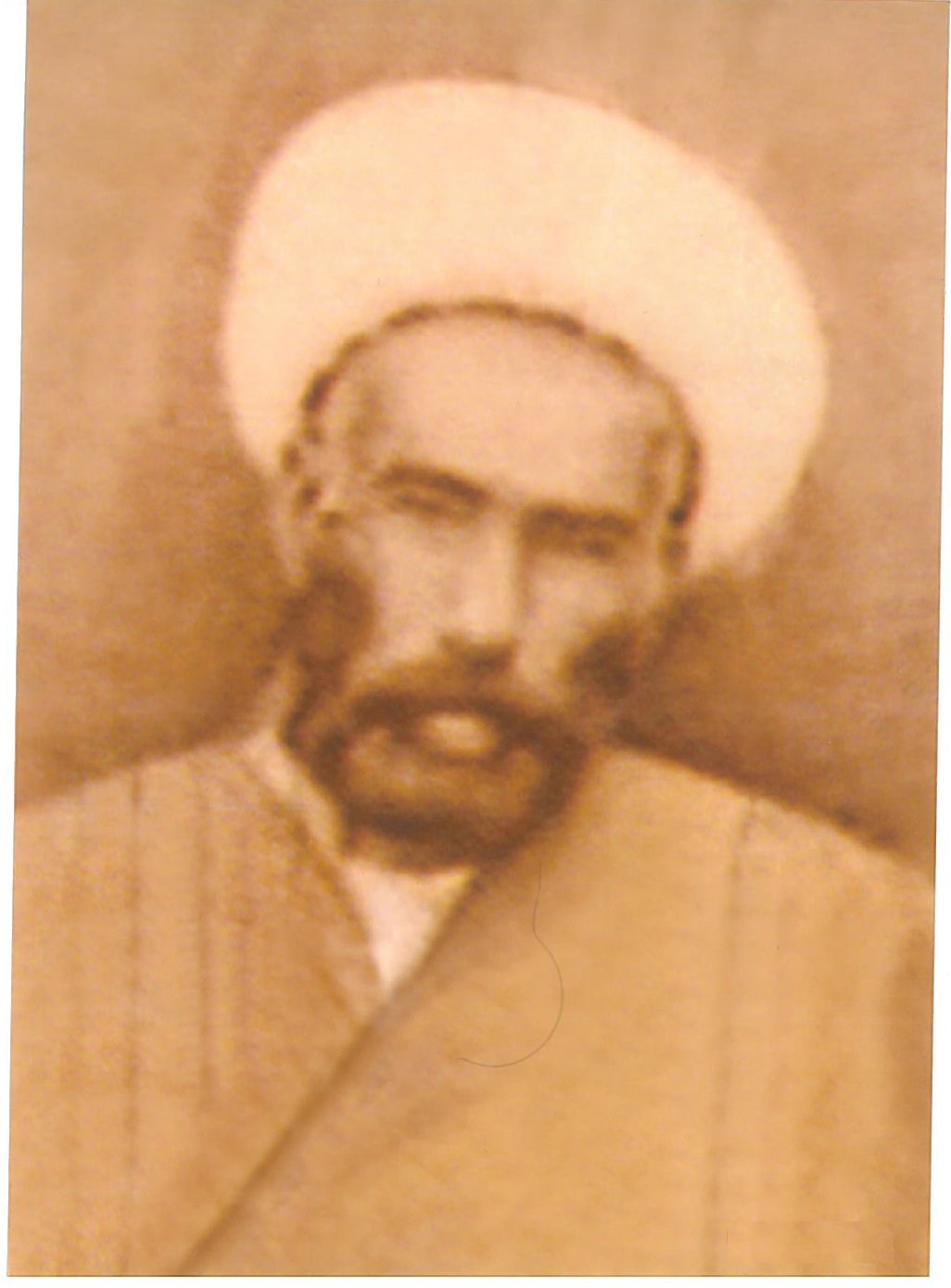
Mohammad Nezam Al Olama Estahbanati.

Mohammad Nezam Al Olama, known as Nezam Al Olama Estahbanati (6 January 1849, in Estahban, Fars province – 20 December 1942, in Estahban, Fars province): was a renowned faqih and one of the most prominent scholars and well-known Ulama of the Qajars and Rezā Shāh era, according to Fars-Nama-ye Naseri and Vaqayeʿ-ye Ettefaqiyeh (book).
