= Dehu, Fars =

Dehu دهو
- Village
- Location within Iran
- Coordinates: 27°09′39″N 53°46′29″E
- Country: Iran
- Province: Fars
- County: Lamerd
- Bakhsh: Eshkanan
- Rural District: Kal

Population (2006)
  - Total: 50
- Time zone: UTC+3:30 (IRST)
  - Summer (DST): UTC+4:30 (IRDT)

Dehu (Persian: دهو, also Romanized as Dehū; also known as Deyyū) is a village in Kal Rural District, Eshkanan District, Lamerd County, Fars province, Iran. At the 2006 census, its population was 50, in 14 families.
