= Hans Aardal =

Norwegian politician

Hans Aardal (6 January 1921 – 3 December 1995) was a Norwegian politician for the Conservative Party.

He served as a deputy representative to the Norwegian Parliament from Sogn og Fjordane during the terms 1965–1969 and 1969–1973.
