= Khorrami (surname) =

Khorrami (Persian: خرمی) is an Iranian surname. Notable people with the surname include:

- Mohammad Khorrami (physicist) (born 1966), Iranian mathematical physicist
- Mohammad Khorrami (wrestler), Iranian freestyle wrestler
- Mohammad Mehdi Khorrami, American literary critic, writer and Iranologist
- Reza Khorrami (born 1946), Iranian freestyle wrestler, brother of Mohammad
