= Ij, Iran =

City in Fars province, Iran

Eij Persian: ايج
- City
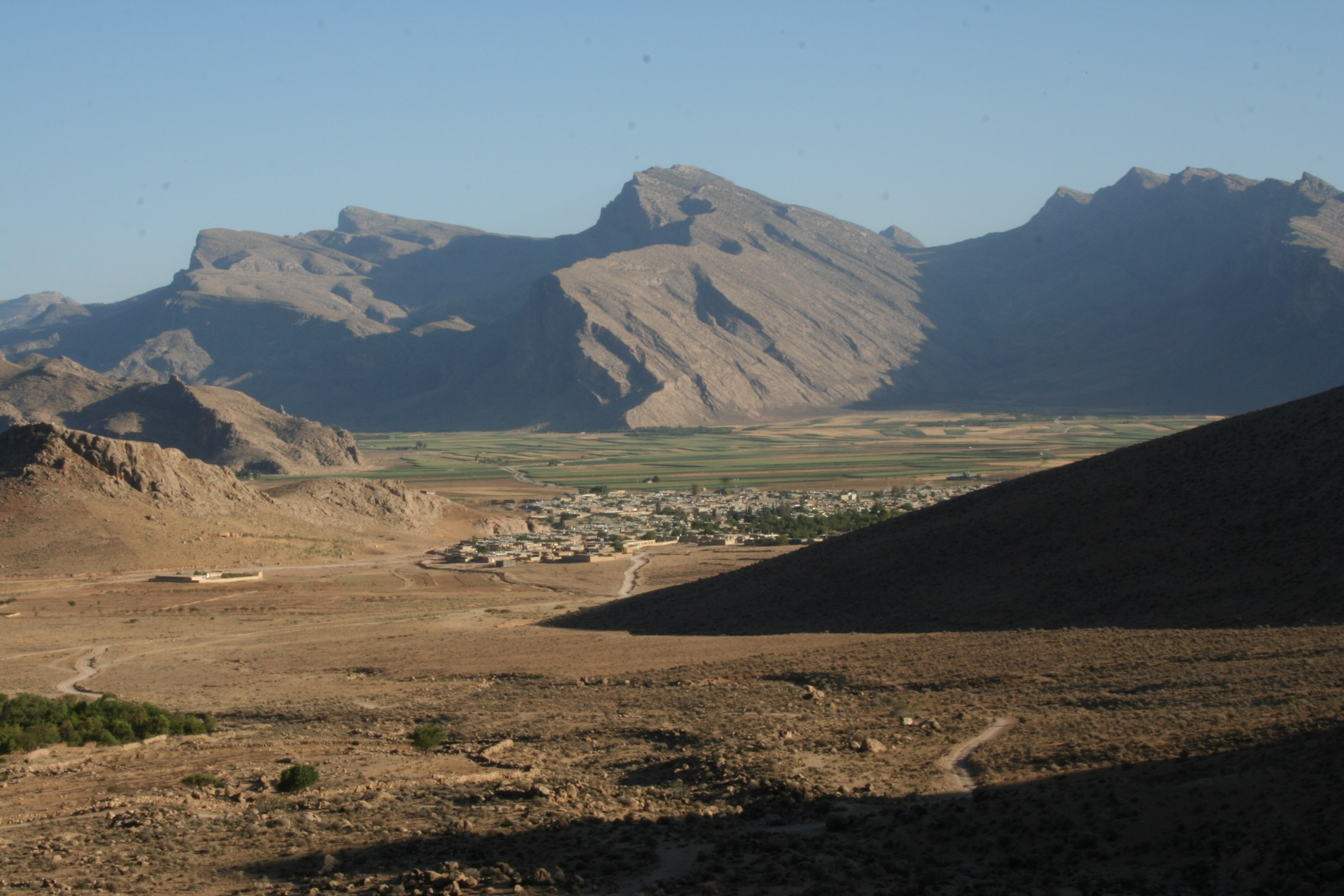

- Location within Iran
- Coordinates: 29°01′10″N 54°14′50″E
- Country: Iran
- Province: Fars
- County: Estahban
- District: Central

Population (2016)
  - Total: 6,246
- Time zone: UTC+3:30 (IRST)

Ij (Persian: ايج) (Note: Also romanized as Īj) is a city in the Central District of Estahban County, Fars province, Iran, serving as the administrative center for Ij Rural District.

== Demographics ==
=== Population ===
At the time of the 2006 National Census, the city's population was 6,233 in 1,497 households. The following census in 2011 counted 5,849 people in 1,622 households. The 2016 census measured the population of the city as 6,246 people in 1,876 households.
