= Dehuiyeh, Kerman =

Dehuiyeh دهوييه
- Village
- Location within Iran
- Coordinates: 30°09′41″N 56°46′56″E
- Country: Iran
- Province: Kerman
- County: Kerman
- Bakhsh: Central
- Rural District: Baghin

Population (2006)
  - Total: 63
- Time zone: UTC+3:30 (IRST)
  - Summer (DST): UTC+4:30 (IRDT)

Dehuiyeh (Persian: دهوييه, also Romanized as Dehūīyeh and Dehūeeyeh) is a village in Baghin Rural District, in the Central District of Kerman County, Kerman Province, Iran. At the 2006 census, its population was 63, in 11 families.
