= Dehuiyeh, Shahr-e Babak =

Dehuiyeh دهوييه
- Village
- Location within Iran
- Coordinates: 30°32′28″N 54°41′50″E
- Country: Iran
- Province: Kerman
- County: Shahr-e Babak
- Bakhsh: Dehaj
- Rural District: Khabar

Population (2006)
  - Total: 326
- Time zone: UTC+3:30 (IRST)
  - Summer (DST): UTC+4:30 (IRDT)

Dehuiyeh (Persian: دهوييه, also Romanized as Dehūīyeh; also known as Dehūeeyeh) is a village in Khabar Rural District, Dehaj District, Shahr-e Babak County, Kerman Province, Iran. At the 2006 census, its population was 326, in 69 families.
