= Dahuiyeh, Ravar =

Dahuiyeh دهوييه
- Village
- Location within Iran
- Coordinates: 30°30′49″N 57°16′17″E
- Country: Iran
- Province: Kerman
- County: Ravar
- Bakhsh: Kuhsaran
- Rural District: Heruz

Population (2006)
  - Total: 27
- Time zone: UTC+3:30 (IRST)
  - Summer (DST): UTC+4:30 (IRDT)

Dahuiyeh (Persian: دهوييه, also Romanized as Dahū’īyeh) is a village in Heruz Rural District, Kuhsaran District, Ravar County, Kerman province, Iran. At the 2006 census, its population was 27, in 8 families.
