= Dehu, Hormozgan =

Dehu دهو
- Village
- Location within Iran
- Coordinates: 27°07′28″N 56°55′59″E
- Country: Iran
- Province: Hormozgan
- County: Minab
- Bakhsh: Central
- Rural District: Tiab

Population (2006)
  - Total: 3,269
- Time zone: UTC+3:30 (IRST)
  - Summer (DST): UTC+4:30 (IRDT)

Dehu (Persian: دهو, also Romanized as Dehū) is a village in Tiab Rural District, in the Central District of Minab County, Hormozgan Province, Iran. At the 2006 census, its population was 3,269, in 665 families.
