= Dehuiyeh, Koshkuiyeh =

Dehuiyeh دهوئيه
- Village
- Location within Iran
- Coordinates: 30°22′22″N 55°27′39″E
- Country: Iran
- Province: Kerman
- County: Rafsanjan
- Bakhsh: Koshkuiyeh
- Rural District: Raviz

Population (2006)
  - Total: 21
- Time zone: UTC+3:30 (IRST)
  - Summer (DST): UTC+4:30 (IRDT)

Dehuiyeh (Persian: دهوئيه, also Romanized as Dehū’īyeh and Dehoo’eyeh) is a village in Raviz Rural District, Koshkuiyeh District, Rafsanjan County, Kerman Province, Iran. At the 2006 census, its population was 21, in 5 families.
