= Dehuyeh, Neyriz =

Dehuyeh دهويه
- Village
- Location within Iran
- Coordinates: 29°11′35″N 54°16′54″E
- Country: Iran
- Province: Fars
- County: Neyriz
- Bakhsh: Central
- Rural District: Rostaq

Population (2006)
  - Total: 88
- Time zone: UTC+3:30 (IRST)
  - Summer (DST): UTC+4:30 (IRDT)

Dehuyeh (Persian: دهويه, also Romanized as Dehūyeh; also known as Deh Mūyeh) is a village in Rostaq Rural District, in the Central District of Neyriz County, Fars province, Iran. At the 2006 census, its population was 88, in 23 families.
