= Ṭuways =

Arab musician of Persian origin (632–711)

- Born: Abū ʿAbd al-Munʿim ʿĪsā b. ʿAbd Allāh al-Ḏh̲āʾib; June 8, 632; Medina
- Died: c. 710—711 (aged 77–79); Medina (uncertain)
- Occupations: Singer; teacher

Ṭuways (Arabic: طُوَيْس; lit. 'little peacock'; 8 June 632 – c. 710—711), formerly romanized as Ṭuwais, was an Arab singer and teacher during the Rashidun Caliphate and early Umayyad Caliphate. He was among the effeminate Mukhannath and his life was the subject of numerous proverbs.

== Life and career ==
Ṭuways was born as Abū ʿAbd al-Munʿim ʿĪsā b. ʿAbd Allāh al-Ḏh̲āʾib on 8 June 632 in Medina; this was the same day as the death of Islamic prophet Muhammad. Later events in his life also coincided with the deaths of important Islamic figures: he was weaned on the day that Abu Bakr (the first Rashidun caliph) died; circumcised when Umar (the second Rashidun caliph) was assassinated, married when Uthman (the third Rashidun caliph) was murdered, and his first son was born when Ali (the fourth and final Rashidun caliph) died. This string of exceptional coincidences led to the proverb, "More unfortunate than Ṭuways".

Early in life, he was raised in the household of Arwā bint Kurayz, who was the caliph Uthman's mother. He was, according to legend, taught by Jamila, a famous singing girl.

He was an important teacher to prominent Arab musicians, including Ibn Surayj. He primarily played the duff, a square tambourine, as accompaniment to his singing. He was noted for his innovation in song forms, including combining Persian and Arabic melodies.
