= Dehu, Kerman =

Dehu دهو
- Village
- Location within Iran
- Coordinates: 30°39′23″N 57°07′05″E
- Country: Iran
- Province: Kerman
- County: Kerman
- Bakhsh: Central
- Rural District: Derakhtengan

Population (2006)
  - Total: 26
- Time zone: UTC+3:30 (IRST)
  - Summer (DST): UTC+4:30 (IRDT)

Dehu (Persian: دهو, also Romanized as Dehū; also known as Dehū’īyeh) is a village in Derakhtengan Rural District, in the Central District of Kerman County, Kerman Province, Iran. At the 2006 census, its population was 26, in 5 families.
