= Shams al-Din al-Kirmani =

Imam Shams al-Din al-Kirmani شمس الدين الكرماني
- Title: Shaykh al-Islam; Shams al-Din; Al-Ḥāfiẓ

Personal life
- Born: 1317 Kerman
- Died: 1384 (aged 66–67) Baghdad
- Era: Middle Ages
- Region: Middle East
- Main interest(s): Hadith, Islamic Jurisprudence, Islamic theology, Legal theory, Tafsir, Grammar, Linguistic, Rhetoric, Logic
- Notable idea: Al-Kawakib al-Darari
- Occupation: Scholar, Traditionist, Jurist, Theologian, Legal theory, Mufassir, Grammarian, Linguist, Rhetorician, Logician

Religious life
- Religion: Islam
- Denomination: Sunni
- Jurisprudence: Shafi'i
- Creed: Ash'ari

Muslim leader
- Influenced by: Al-Shafi'i Abu Hasan al-Ash'ari Adud al-Din al-Iji

Abū 'Abd Allāh Shams al-Din Muḥammad b. Yūsuf b. ʿAlī al-Kirmāni, better known as Shams al-Din al-Kirmani (Arabic: شمس الدين الكرماني, romanized: Shams al-Dīn al-Kirmānī; 1317 – 1384) was a Sunni Muslim scholar originally from Kerman. He was a distinguished scholar who specialized in a number of Islamic sciences including Hadith, Islamic jurisprudence, legal theory, Quran exegesis, Arabic, and scholastic theology. He wrote Al-Kawakib al-Darari, a classical and renowned commentary on Sahih al-Bukhari.

== Life ==
Born around 717 AH/1317 CE in Kerman, he began his education there under the guidance of his father, Baha al-Din. Later, he studied rational and Arabic sciences for twelve years under Adud al-Din al-Iji in Shiraz. After that, al-Kirmani travelled to Egypt and Syria in order to study Hadith. He devoted his time there to learning the science, and as a result, he rose to prominence in his era as a muhaddith. He made his home in Baghdad and spent the final thirty years of his life there spreading knowledge. He lived in a humble, frugal and ascetic lifestyle. The sultans would visit his home seeking prayers and advice from him. Al-Kirmani performed Umrah and died returning from Hajj in the year 786 AH/1384 CE. His body was transported to Baghdad, and was buried in a grave he had prepared for himself, near Abu Ishaq al-Shirazi.

== Works ==
Al-Kirmani wrote several commentaries of well-known works written by his master Adud al-Din al-Iji including a commentary on ethics Akhlaq al-Adudiyya. He wrote a commentary on theology, Al-Mawāqif fī 'ilm al-kalām as well as Iji's work on rhetoric al-Fawa'id al-Ghiyathiyya. Al-Kirmani was known for his expertise in the interpretation on the Quran as he wrote a commentary on Anwar al-Tanzil wa-Asrar al-Ta'wil by al-Baydawi as well as a commentary on Al-Kashshaaf by al-Zamakhshari. Al-Kirmani classified Arabic works and composed a book on logic.

== See also ==
- List of Ash'aris
- List of Muslim theologians
