= Runiz Rural District =

Rural district in Fars province, Iran

Runiz Rural District Persian: دهستان رونيز
- Rural District
- Location within Iran
- Coordinates: 29°12′15″N 53°48′31″E
- Country: Iran
- Province: Fars
- County: Estahban
- District: Runiz
- Capital: Runiz

Population (2016)
  - Total: 5,536
- Time zone: UTC+3:30 (IRST)

Runiz Rural District (Persian: دهستان رونيز) is in Runiz District of Estahban County, Fars province, Iran. It is administered from the city of Runiz.

== Demographics ==
=== Population ===
At the time of the 2006 National Census, the rural district's population was 5,639 in 1,344 households. There were 5,665 inhabitants in 1,557 households at the following census of 2011. The 2016 census measured the population of the rural district as 5,536 in 1,637 households. The most populous of its 63 villages was Runiz-e Sofla, with 1,880 people.
