= Ij Rural District =

Rural district in Fars province, Iran

Ij Rural District Persian: دهستان ايج
- Rural District
- Location within Iran
- Coordinates: 29°01′06″N 54°13′27″E
- Country: Iran
- Province: Fars
- County: Estahban
- District: Central
- Capital: Ij

Population (2016)
  - Total: 3,510
- Time zone: UTC+3:30 (IRST)

Ij Rural District (Persian: دهستان ايج) is in the Central District of Estahban County, Fars province, Iran. It is administered from the city of Ij.

== Demographics ==
=== Population ===
At the time of the 2006 National Census, the rural district's population was 4,248 in 930 households. There were 3,653 inhabitants in 1,034 households at the following census of 2011. The 2016 census measured the population of the rural district as 3,510 in 1,089 households. The most populous of its 54 villages was Darb Qaleh, with 1,122 people.
