= Central District (Estahban County) =

District in Fars province, Iran

Central District (Estahban County) Persian: بخش مرکزی شهرستان استهبان
- District
- Location within Iran
- Coordinates: 29°01′06″N 54°13′27″E
- Country: Iran
- Province: Fars
- County: Estahban
- Capital: Estahban

Population (2016)
  - Total: 46,166
- Time zone: UTC+3:30 (IRST)

The Central District of Estahban County (Persian: بخش مرکزی شهرستان استهبان) is in Fars province, Iran. Its capital is the city of Estahban.

== Demographics ==
=== Population ===
At the time of the 2006 National Census, the district's population was 43,582 in 44,141 households. The following census in 2011 counted 44,141 people in 12,386 households. The 2016 census measured the population of the district as 46,166 inhabitants in 13,935 households.

=== Administrative divisions ===
Central District (Estahban County) Population
Administrative Divisions	2006	2011	2016
Ij RD	4,248	3,653	3,510
Estahban (city)	33,101	34,639	36,410
Ij (city)	6,233	5,849	6,246
Total	43,582	44,141	46,166
RD = Rural District
