= Khir Rural District =

Rural district in Fars province, Iran

Khir Rural District Persian: دهستان خير
- Rural District
- Location within Iran
- Coordinates: 29°20′57″N 53°48′24″E
- Country: Iran
- Province: Fars
- County: Estahban
- District: Runiz
- Capital: Mah Farrokhan

Population (2016)
  - Total: 11,352
- Time zone: UTC+3:30 (IRST)

Khir Rural District (Persian: دهستان خير) is in Runiz District of Estahban County, Fars province, Iran. Its capital is the village of Mah Farrokhan.

== Demographics ==
=== Population ===
At the time of the 2006 National Census, the rural district's population was 11,179 in 2,655 households. There were 10,773 inhabitants in 3,114 households at the following census of 2011. The 2016 census measured the population of the rural district as 11,352 in 3,543 households. The most populous of its 45 villages was Sahlabad, with 1,882 people.
