= Runiz District =

District in Fars province, Iran

Runiz District Persian: بخش رونیز
- District
- Location within Iran
- Coordinates: 29°17′15″N 53°48′32″E
- Country: Iran
- Province: Fars
- County: Estahban
- Capital: Runiz

Population (2016)
  - Total: 22,648
- Time zone: UTC+3:30 (IRST)

Runiz District (Persian: بخش رونیز) is in Estahban County, Fars province, Iran. Its capital is the city of Runiz.

== Demographics ==
=== Population ===
At the time of the 2006 National Census, the district's population was 22,809 in 5,465 households. The following census in 2011 counted 22,031 people in 6,235 households. The 2016 census measured the population of the district as 22,648 inhabitants in 6,944 households.

=== Administrative divisions ===
Runiz District Population
Administrative Divisions	2006	2011	2016
Khir RD	11,179	10,773	11,352
Runiz RD	5,639	5,665	5,536
Runiz (city)	5,991	5,593	5,760
Total	22,809	22,031	22,648
RD = Rural District
