= Estahban County =

County in Fars province, Iran

Estahban County Persian: شهرستان استهبان
- County
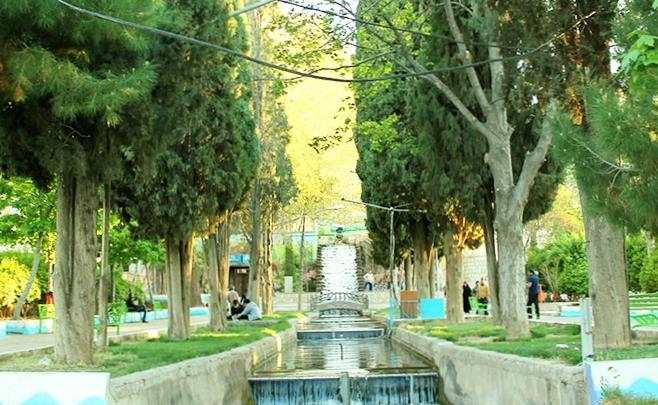

- Location of Estahban County in Fars province (center right, yellow)

- Location of Fars province in Iran
- Coordinates: 29°12′N 54°00′E
- Country: Iran
- Province: Fars
- Capital: Estahban
- Districts: Central, Runiz

Population (2016)
  - Total: 68,850
- Time zone: UTC+3:30 (IRST)

Estahban County (Persian: شهرستان استهبان) is in Fars province, Iran. Its capital is the city of Estahban.

== Demographics ==
=== Population ===
At the time of the 2006 National Census, the county's population was 66,391 in 16,606 households. The following census in 2011 counted 66,172 people in 18,584 households. The 2016 census measured the population of the county as 68,850 in 20,890 households.

=== Administrative divisions ===
Estahban County's population history and administrative structure over three consecutive censuses are shown in the following table.

Estahban County Population
Administrative Divisions	2006	2011	2016
Central District	43,582	44,141	46,166
Ij RD	4,248	3,653	3,510
Estahban (city)	33,101	34,639	36,410
Ij (city)	6,233	5,849	6,246
Runiz District	22,809	22,031	22,648
Khir RD	11,179	10,773	11,352
Runiz RD	5,639	5,665	5,536
Runiz (city)	5,991	5,593	5,760
Total	66,391	66,172	68,850
RD = Rural District

== See also ==
Media related to Estahban County at Wikimedia Commons
