= Pabag =

Iranian ruler of Pars from c. 205 to c. 210

Pabag 𐭯𐭠𐭯𐭪𐭩
- Shah
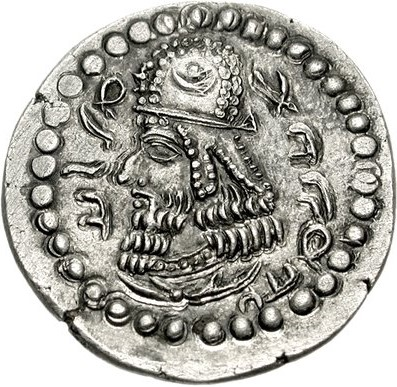
- A coin with the portrait of Pabag, minted by Ardashir I

King of Istakhr
- Reign: 205/6 – 207–10
- Predecessor: Gochihr
- Successor: Shapur
- Died: 207–210; Istakhr, Pars, Iran
- Issue: Shapur; Ardashir; Denag
- Religion: Zoroastrianism

Pabag (Middle Persian: 𐭯𐭠𐭯𐭪𐭩, Pāpak/Pābag; Persian: بابک, romanized: Bābak) was an Persian king who ruled Stakhr, the capital of Pars, from 205 or 206 until his death sometime between 207 and 210. He was the father, stepfather, grandfather, or father-in-law of Ardashir I, the founder of the Sasanian Empire. He was succeeded by his eldest son, Shapur.

== Background and state of Pars ==
Pars (also known as Persis), a region in the southwestern Iranian plateau, was the homeland of a southwestern branch of the Iranian people, the Persians. It was also the birthplace of the first Iranian Empire, the Achaemenids. The region served as the center of the empire until its conquest by the Macedonian king Alexander the Great (r. 336–323 BC). Since the end of the 3rd or the beginning of the 2nd century BCE, Pars has been ruled by local dynasties subject to the Hellenistic Seleucid Empire. These dynasts held the ancient Persian title of frataraka ("leader, governor, forerunner"), which is also attested in the Achaemenid-era. Later, under the frataraka Wadfradad II (fl. 138 BC), Pars was made a vassal of the Iranian Parthian (Arsacid) Empire. The frataraka were shortly afterwards replaced by the Kings of Persis, most likely at the accession of the Arsacid monarch Phraates II (r. 132–127 BC). Unlike the fratarakas, the Kings of Persis used the title of shah ("king") and laid the foundations for a new dynasty, which may be labelled the Darayanids.

== Origins ==
=== New Persian and Arabic texts ===
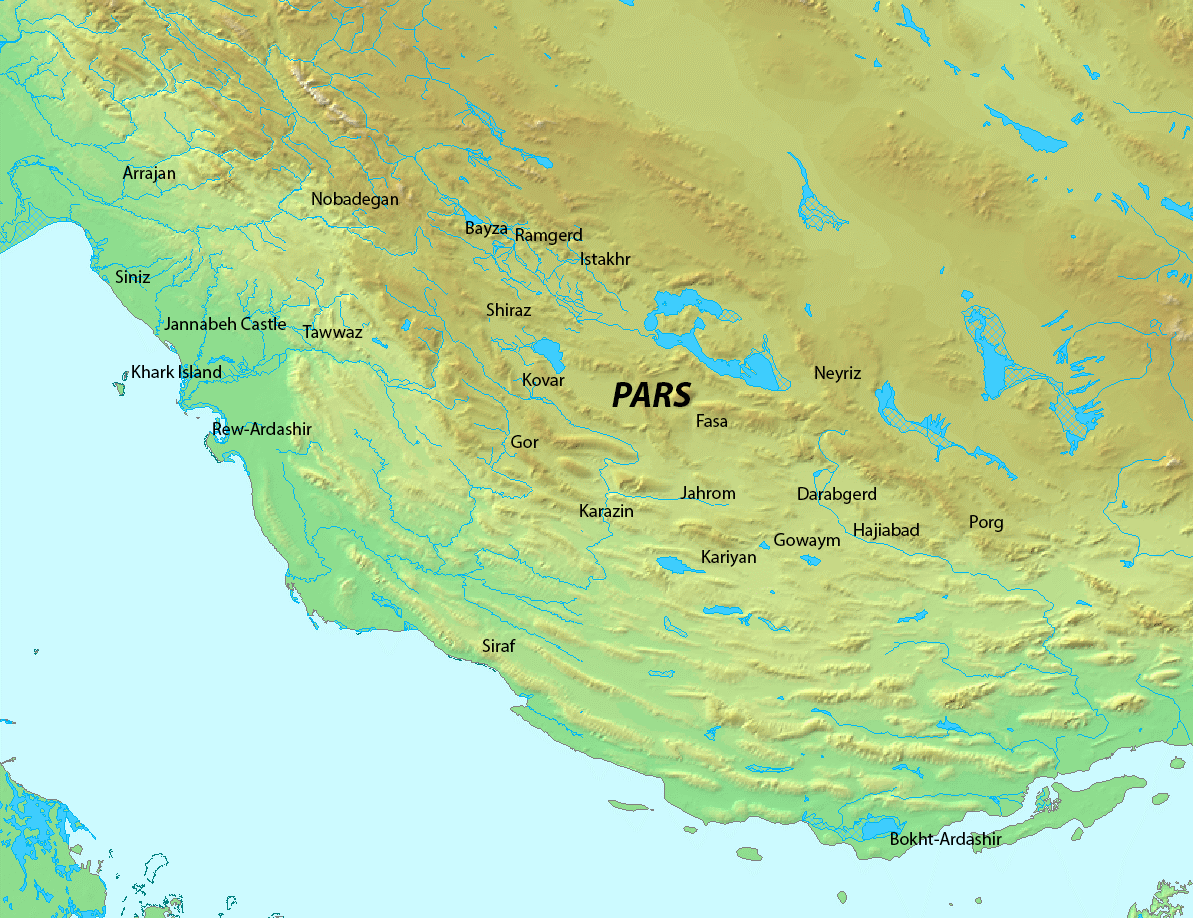
Map of Pars

There are various different sources regarding the relationship between Pabag, Sasan, and the first Sasanian monarch, Ardashir I (r. 224–242). According to the Shahnameh ("The Book of Kings") by the medieval Persian poet Ferdowsi (d. 1020), Sasan was a descendant of the mythological Kayanian rulers Dara II, Dara I, Kay Bahman, Esfandiyar, and Vishtaspa. The claim of Sasan belonging to the Kayanian family was designed in order to justify that Ardashir was descended from the ancient Kayanian kings, who reflected memories of the Achaemenids. It was a means of legitimizing Ardashir's rule.

Dara II, the last Kayanian king to rule before Alexander, is partly based on the last Achaemenid King of Kings, Darius III (r. 336–330 BC), whose empire was indeed conquered by Alexander's forces. A son of Dara II named Sasan (called "the elder") fled to India and lived there in exile until his death. He was survived by a son who was likewise named Sasan (called "the younger"), "which continued in the family for four generations". A descendant of the family, likewise named Sasan, worked for Pabag, who was a local ruler in Pars. Pabag's daughter married Sasan and bore him a son named Ardashir. Following this, Sasan is no longer mentioned. The Shahnameh thus indicates that the ancestors of Sasan resided in India following Alexander's conquests. This report has been used by scholars to point out Sasan's Indo-Parthian connection.

According to the medieval Iranian historian Al-Tabari (d. 923), Pabag was the son of Sasan and a princess named Rambihisht, who was from the Bazrangid family, a dynasty of rulers in Pars. He presents Pabag as the father of Ardashir. Like Ferdowsi in his Shahnameh, Al-Tabari also describes Sasan as a foreigner in Pars; however, unlike him, he does not mention Sasan's place of origins.

=== Middle Persian texts ===
The Middle Persian text Kar-Namag i Ardashir i Pabagan ("Book of the Deeds of Ardashir, son of Pabag"), says the following regarding the ancestry of Ardashir: "Ardashir, the Kayanian, son of Pabag from the parentage of Sasan and from the lineage of King Dara". Another Middle Persian text, the Bundahishn, however, gives the genealogy of Ardashir as follows: "Ardashir son of Pabag whose mother was the daughter of Sasan son of Weh-afrid". This demonstrates the inconsistencies between Middle Persian texts regarding the origins of the Sasanian dynasty. Both sources regard Pabag as the father of Ardashir, while Sasan is presented as the latter's grandfather or ancestor.

=== Roman and Armenian texts ===
In Roman and Armenian sources, a different account appears. According to the Roman historians Agathias and George Syncellus, Sasan was the biological father of Ardashir, while Pabag was his stepfather. The Armenian writers Movses Khorenatsi and Agathangelos likewise call Sasan the father of Ardashir. However, they do not make any mention of Pabag. A Greek variant of Agathangelos' work calls Ardashir "son of Sasanus, which is the origin of the Sasanian name of the Persian kings descended from him".

=== Sasanian inscriptions and coinage ===
Ardashir, in his coin engravings and inscription on Naqsh-e Rostam, claims to be the son of "divine Pabag, the king". His son and successor, Shapur I (r. 240–270), on his inscriptions at Naqsh-e Rajab and Ka'ba-ye Zartosht, calls himself a son of Ardashir I and grandson of Pabag. Although various figures named "Sasan" are mentioned in the inscription, none of them are associated with the House of Sasan. The Paikuli inscription of Shapur I's son Narseh (r. 293–303), however, makes direct references to the House of Sasan, such as the phrase "since the gods gave glory and rulership to the family of Sasan", which indicates that Narseh saw Sasan as his ancestor.

=== Conclusions in modern scholarship ===
The modern historian Marek Jan Olbrycht suggests that Sasan was an Indo-Parthian prince who married a Persian princess and gave birth to Ardashir. In order to not be seen as a foreign dynasty, however, Ardashir and Shapur I minimized the role of Sasan. Pabag was seemingly the father-in-law and possibly adoptive father of Ardashir.

== Biography ==
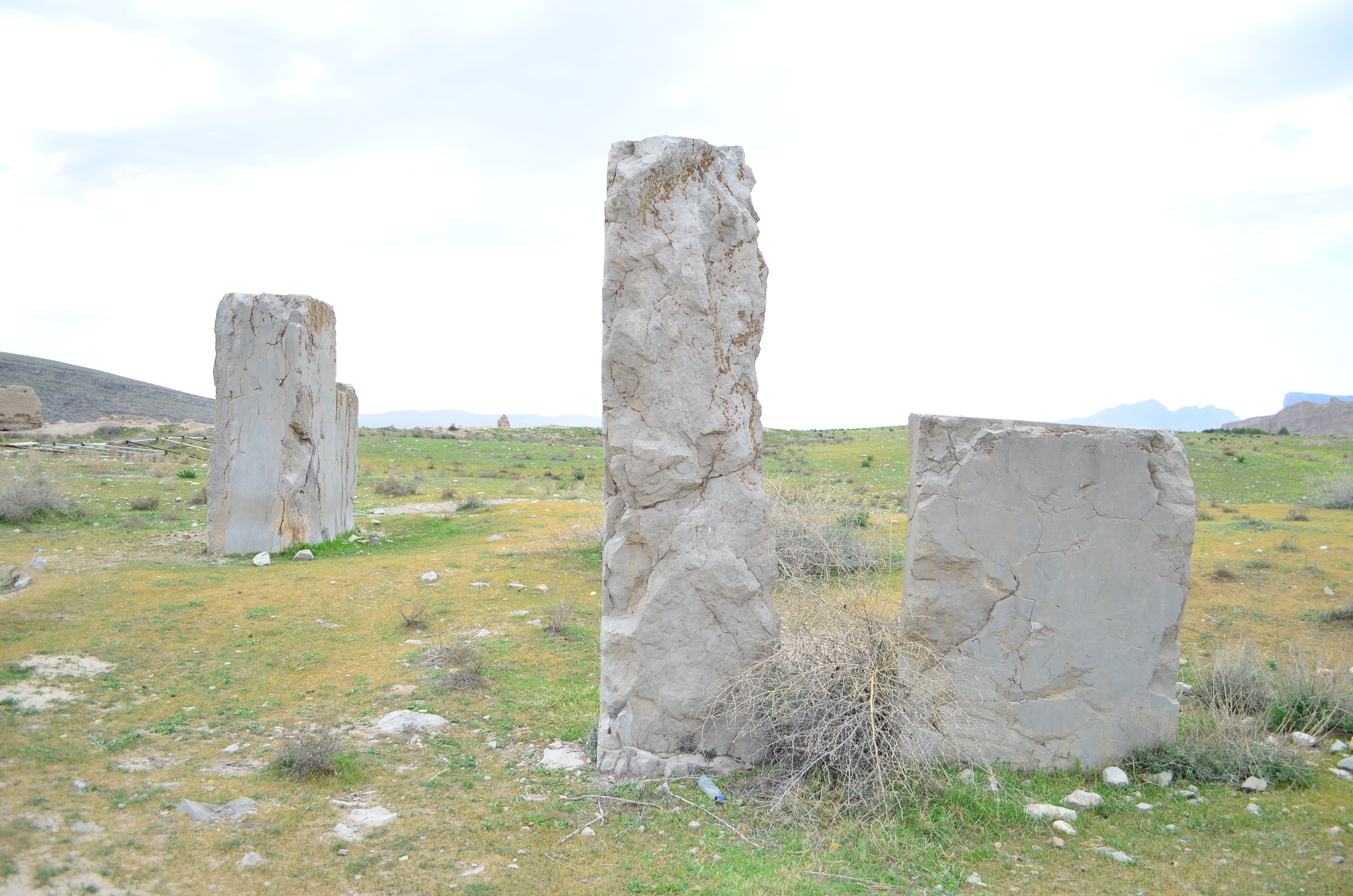
Ruins of Istakhr, the capital of Pars

Pabag ruled a small principality in the area of Khir, south of Bakhtegan Lake. He was a vassal of Gochihr, the Bazrangid king of the Persian capital of Stakhr, who was in turn a vassal of the Parthian (Arsacid) emperor. With the permission of Gochihr, Pabag sent Ardashir to the fortress of Darabgerd to serve under its commander, Tiri. Pabag reportedly served as a priest of the Temple of Anahita, Istakhr, which served as a rallying point for the local Persian soldiers, who worshipped the Iranian goddess. The Parthian Empire, then ruled by Vologases V (r. 191–208), was in decline due to wars with the Romans, civil wars, and regional revolts. The Roman emperor Septimius Severus (r. 193–211) invaded the Arsacid domains in 196, and two years later he did the same, this time sacking the Arsacid capital of Ctesiphon. At the same time, revolts occurred in Media and Pars.

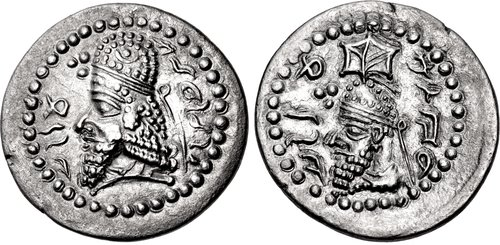
Coin minted under Pabag's son Shapur. The obverse shows a portrait of the latter, whilst the reverse shows a portrait of Pabag

The Iranologist Touraj Daryaee argues that the reign of Vologases V was "the turning point in Arsacid history, in that the dynasty lost much of its prestige." The kings of Persis were now unable to depend on their weakened Arsacid overlords. Indeed, in 205 or 206, Pabag rebelled and overthrew Gochihr, taking Istakhr for himself. According to al-Tabari, it was at the urging of Ardashir that Pabag rebelled. However, Daryaee considers this statement unlikely and states that, in reality, the eldest son Shapur who helped Pabag capture Stakhr, as demonstrated by the latter's coinage, which features portraits of both.

Pabag subsequently appointed Shapur as his heir. This was much to the dislike of Ardashir, who had become the commander of Darabgerd after the death of Tiri. In an act of defiance, Ardashir left for Ardashir-Khwarrah, where he fortified himself, preparing to attack his brother Shapur after Pabag's death. (Note: Physical evidence demonstrates that it was not from Darabgerd, as stated by al-Tabari, that Ardashir started expanding his domains, but from Ardashir-Khwarrah.) Pabag died a natural death sometime between 207–210 and was succeeded by Shapur. After his death, both Ardashir and Shapur started minted coins with the title of "king" and the portrait of Pabag. The obverse of Shapur's coins had the inscription "His Majesty, King Shapur" and the reverse had "son of (His) Majesty, King Pabag". Shapur's reign, however, proved short; he died under obscure conditions in 211 or 212. Ardashir thus succeeded Shapur, and went on to conquer the rest of Iran, establishing the Sasanian Empire in 224. Pabag was also survived by a daughter named Denag, who married Ardashir.

== Sources ==
- Curtis, Vesta Sarkhosh; Stewart, Sarah (2008). The Sasanian Era. I.B.Tauris. pp. 1–200. ISBN 9780857719720.
- Daryaee, Touraj (2014). Sasanian Persia: The Rise and Fall of an Empire. I.B.Tauris. pp. 1–240. ISBN 978-0857716668.
- Daryaee, Touraj (2012). "The Sasanian Empire (224–651)". In Daryaee, Touraj (ed.). The Oxford Handbook of Iranian History. Oxford University Press. ISBN 978-0199732159.
- Daryaee, Touraj (2010). "Ardashir and the Sasanians' Rise to Power". Anabasis. Studia Classica Et Orientalia. 1. University of California: 236–255.
- Frye, R. N. (1988). "Bābak (1)". Encyclopaedia Iranica, Vol. III, Fasc. 3. pp. 298–299.
- Gignoux, Philippe (1994). "Dēnag". Encyclopaedia Iranica, Vol. VII, Fasc. 3. p. 282.
- Kia, Mehrdad (2016). The Persian Empire: A Historical Encyclopedia. ABC-CLIO. ISBN 978-1610693912. (2 volumes)
- McDonough, Scott (2013). "Military and Society in Sasanian Iran". In Campbell, Brian; Tritle, Lawrence A. (eds.). The Oxford Handbook of Warfare in the Classical World. Oxford University Press. pp. 1–783. ISBN 9780195304657.
- Olbrycht, Marek Jan (2016). "Dynastic Connections in the Arsacid Empire and the Origins of the House of Sāsān". In Curtis, Vesta Sarkhosh; Pendleton, Elizabeth J.; Alram, Michael; Daryaee, Touraj (eds.). The Parthian and Early Sasanian Empires: Adaptation and Expansion. Oxbow Books. ISBN 9781785702082.
- Shayegan, M. Rahim (2011). Arsacids and Sasanians: Political Ideology in Post-Hellenistic and Late Antique Persia. Cambridge University Press. pp. 1–539. ISBN 9780521766418.
- Rezakhani, Khodadad (2017). "East Iran in Late Antiquity". ReOrienting the Sasanians: East Iran in Late Antiquity. Edinburgh University Press. pp. 1–256. ISBN 9781474400305. JSTOR 10.3366/j.ctt1g04zr8. (registration required)
- Wiesehöfer, Joseph (1986). "Ardašīr I i. History". Encyclopaedia Iranica, Vol. II, Fasc. 4. pp. 371–376.
- Wiesehöfer, Josef (2000b). "Frataraka". Encyclopaedia Iranica, Vol. X, Fasc. 2. p. 195.
- Wiesehöfer, Joseph (2000a). "Fārs ii. History in the Pre-Islamic Period". Encyclopaedia Iranica.
- Wiesehöfer, Josef (2009). "Persis, Kings of". Encyclopaedia Iranica.

Preceded by Gochihr	King of Istakhr; 205/6 – 207–10	Succeeded by Shapur
