= Shapur (son of Pabag) =

Early 3rd century king of Persis

Shapur 𐭱𐭧𐭯𐭥𐭧𐭥𐭩
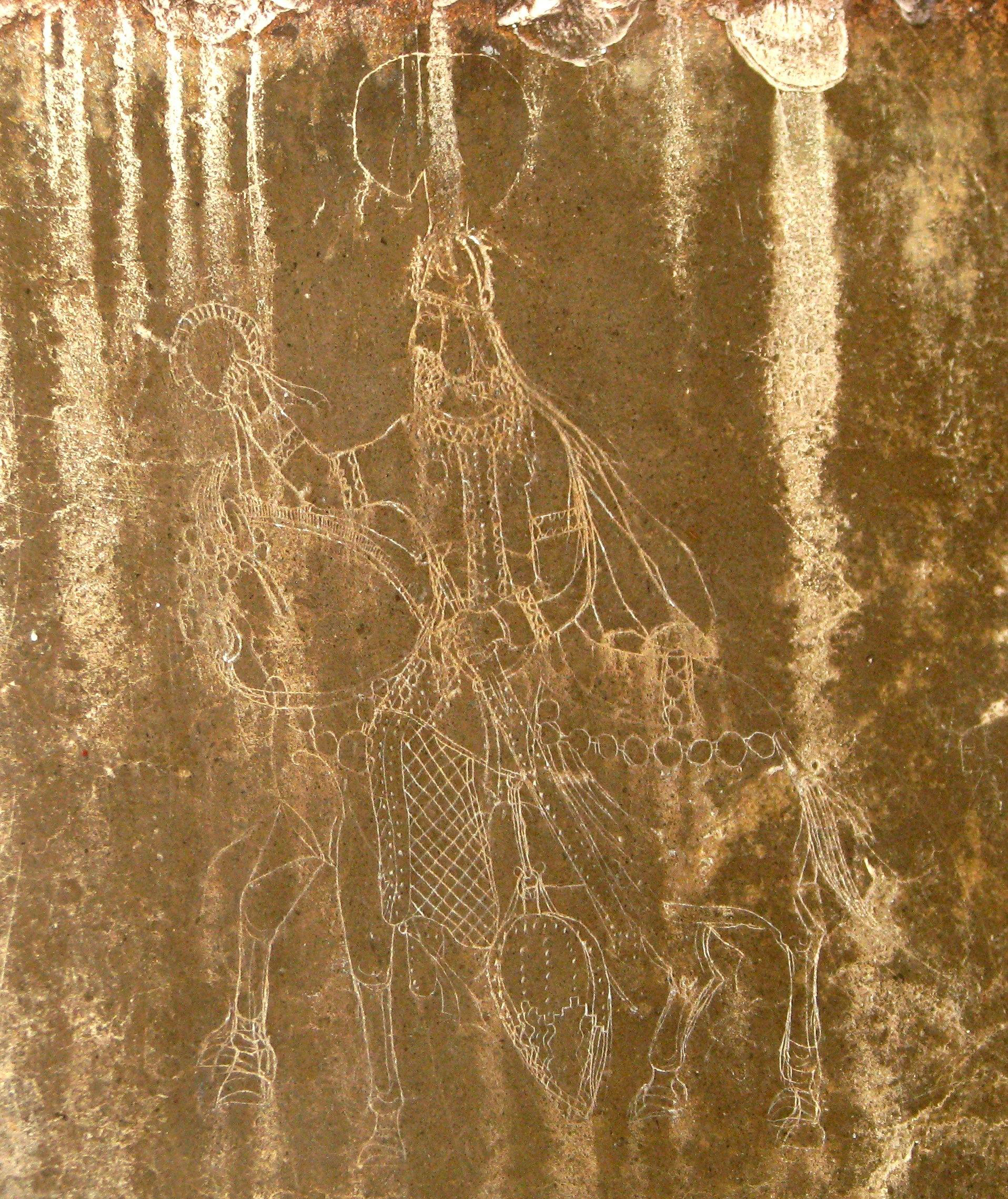
- Graffiti of Shapur in Tachara, Persepolis.

King of Persis
- Reign: 207/10 – 211/2
- Predecessor: Pabag
- Successor: Ardashir I (new dynasty)
- Died: 211/2; Darabgerd
- Issue: Narseh
- House: House of Sasan
- Father: Pabag
- Religion: Zoroastrianism

Shapur (Middle Persian: 𐭱𐭧𐭯𐭥𐭧𐭥𐭩) was an Iranian prince, who was the penultimate King of Persis from 207–210 to 211/2. He was succeeded by his younger brother Ardashir I, who founded the Sasanian Empire.

== Background and state of Pars ==
Pars (also known as Persis), a region in the southwestern Iranian plateau, was the homeland of a southwestern branch of the Iranian peoples, the Persians. It was also the birthplace of the first Iranian Empire, the Achaemenids. The region served as the center of the empire until its conquest by the Macedonian king Alexander the Great (r. 336–323 BC). Since the end of the 3rd or the beginning of the 2nd century BCE, Pars was ruled by local dynasts subject to the Hellenistic Seleucid Empire. These dynasts held the ancient Persian title of frataraka ("leader, governor, forerunner"), which is also attested in the Achaemenid-era. Later under the frataraka Wadfradad II (fl. 138 BC) was made a vassal of the Iranian Parthian (Arsacid) Empire. The frataraka were shortly afterwards replaced by the Kings of Persis, most likely at the accession of the Arsacid monarch Phraates II (r. 132–127 BC). Unlike the fratarakas, the Kings of Persis used the title of shah ("king"), and laid foundations to a new dynasty, which may be labelled the Darayanids.

== Biography ==
Shapur's father, Pabag, ruled a small principality in the area of Khir, south of the Bakhtegan Lake. He was a vassal of Gochihr, the Bazrangid king of the Persian capital of Istakhr, who was in turn a vassal of the Arsacid King of Kings. With the permission of Gochihr, Pabag sent his younger son Ardashir to the fortress of Darabgerd to serve under its commander, Tiri. Pabag reportedly served as a priest of the fire-temple of Anahita in Istakhr, which served as a rallying point of the local Persian soldiers, who worshipped the Iranian goddess. The Arsacid Empire, then ruled by Vologases V (r. 191–208), was at this time in decline, due to wars with the Romans, civil wars and regional revolts. The Roman emperor Septimius Severus (r. 193–211) had invaded the Arsacid domains in 196, and two years later did the same, this time sacking the Arsacid capital of Ctesiphon. At the same time, revolts occurred in Media and Pars.

The Iranologist Touraj Daryaee argues that the reign of Vologases V was "the turning point in Arsacid history, in that the dynasty lost much of its prestige." The kings of Persis were now unable to depend on their weakened Arsacid overlords. Indeed, in 205/6, Pabag rebelled and overthrew Gochihr, taking Istakhr for himself. According to al-Tabari, it was at the urging of Ardashir that Pabag rebelled. However, Daryaee considers this statement unlikely, and states that it was in reality Shapur that helped Pabag to capture Istakhr, as demonstrated by the latter's coinage which has portraits of both them.

There he appointed his eldest son Shapur as his heir. This was much to the dislike of Ardashir, who had become the commander of Darabgerd after the death of Tiri. Ardashir in an act of defiance, left for Ardashir-Khwarrah, where he fortified himself, preparing to attack his brother Shapur after Pabag's death. (Note: Physical evidence demonstrates that it was not from Darabgerd, as stated by al-Tabari, that Ardashir started expanding his domains, but from Ardashir-Khwarrah.) Pabag died a natural death sometime between 207–10 and was succeeded by Shapur to whom Ardashir did not give allegiance. After his death, both Ardashir and Shapur started minted coins with the title of "king" and the portrait of Pabag. Shapur's reign, however, proved short; he died under obscure conditions in 211/2.

According to sources, Shapur stopped at a ruin while assaulting Darabgerd and a stone suddenly separated from the ceiling and hit his head and Shapur succumbed immediately. After the incident, the brothers relinquished the Persian throne and crown to Ardashir, who became the Persian Shah thereafter. Ardashir and his followers could be considered the main suspects of Shapur's mysterious death, since they "benefitted from the accidental death"; but the accusation is not provable.

Ardashir thus succeeded Shapur, and went on to conquer the rest of Iran, thus establishing the Sasanian Empire. A nephew of Ardashir, Narseh, whose name is mentioned in the Ka'ba-ye Zartosht, was most likely the son of Shapur.

== Sources ==
- Curtis, Vesta Sarkhosh; Stewart, Sarah (2008). The Sasanian Era. I.B.Tauris. pp. 1–200. ISBN 9780857719720.
- Daryaee, Touraj (2014). Sasanian Persia: The Rise and Fall of an Empire. I.B.Tauris. pp. 1–240. ISBN 978-0857716668.
- Daryaee, Touraj (2012). "The Sasanian Empire (224–651)". In Daryaee, Touraj (ed.). The Oxford Handbook of Iranian History. Oxford University Press. ISBN 978-0199732159.
- Daryaee, Touraj (2010). "Ardashir and the Sasanians' Rise to Power". University of California: 236–255.
- Frye, R. N. (1988). "Bābak (1)". Encyclopaedia Iranica, Vol. III, Fasc. 3. pp. 298–299.
- Gignoux, Philippe (1994). "Dēnag". Encyclopaedia Iranica, Vol. VII, Fasc. 3. p. 282.
- Kia, Mehrdad (2016). The Persian Empire: A Historical Encyclopedia. ABC-CLIO. ISBN 978-1610693912. (2 volumes)
- McDonough, Scott (2013). "Military and Society in Sasanian Iran". In Campbell, Brian; Tritle, Lawrence A. (eds.). The Oxford Handbook of Warfare in the Classical World. Oxford University Press. pp. 1–783. ISBN 9780195304657.
- Olbrycht, Marek Jan (2016). "Dynastic Connections in the Arsacid Empire and the Origins of the House of Sāsān". In Curtis, Vesta Sarkhosh; Pendleton, Elizabeth J.; Alram, Michael; Daryaee, Touraj (eds.). The Parthian and Early Sasanian Empires: Adaptation and Expansion. Oxbow Books. ISBN 9781785702082.
- Shayegan, M. Rahim (2011). Arsacids and Sasanians: Political Ideology in Post-Hellenistic and Late Antique Persia. Cambridge University Press. pp. 1–539. ISBN 9780521766418.
- Rezakhani, Khodadad (2017). "East Iran in Late Antiquity". ReOrienting the Sasanians: East Iran in Late Antiquity. Edinburgh University Press. pp. 1–256. ISBN 9781474400305. JSTOR 10.3366/j.ctt1g04zr8. (registration required)
- Wiesehöfer, Joseph (1986). "Ardašīr I i. History". Encyclopaedia Iranica, Vol. II, Fasc. 4. pp. 371–376.
- Wiesehöfer, Josef (2000b). "Frataraka". Encyclopaedia Iranica, Vol. X, Fasc. 2. p. 195.
- Wiesehöfer, Joseph (2000a). "Fārs ii. History in the Pre-Islamic Period". Encyclopaedia Iranica.
- Wiesehöfer, Josef (2009). "Persis, Kings of". Encyclopaedia Iranica.
