= Homay-nameh =

Homāy-nāmeh (Persian: همای‌نامه) is an epic poem in Persian language which relates the story of Homay daughter of Kay Bahman. Shahnameh contains a shorter version of this epic. Composed by an unknown author in 6th century AH, Homāy-nāmeh contains 4,332 couplets and very few number of Arabic loanwords.
