= Farrokhzad i Gushnanoshan =

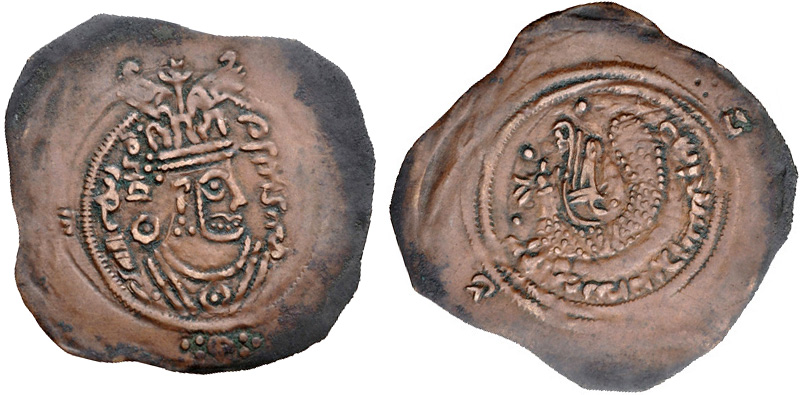
- Coin of Farrokhzad i Gushnanoshan, minted in 695–699 at Ardashir-Khwarrah. A Sasanian-style bust is on the obverse and a Simurgh is on the reverse

Sub-governor of several cities in the Fars province
- Deputy: al-Muhallab ibn Abi Sufra
- Preceded by: Gushn-Anosh

Personal details
- Parent: Gushn-Anosh (father)

Farrokhzad i Gushnanoshan was an Iranian lord of the late 7th century who, under the authority of al-Muhallab ibn Abi Sufra, served as the sub-governor of several cities in the Fars province, including Istakhr.

== Etymology ==
"Farrokhzad i Gushnanoshan" means "Farrokhzad, Son of Gushn-Anosh". "Farrokhzad" is a combination of farrokh ("endowed with light") and zād ("born"), meaning "born luminous (i.e., endowed with farnah [divine glory/splendor])". Farrokhzad's father was named Gushn-Anosh, a name linked with the suffix ī that further takes the suffix -an at the end to indicate his parentage.

== Biography ==
During the Arab Muslim conquest of Iran, the major battles at al-Qadisiyyah, Jalula, and Nahavand between 636–642 cost the Sasanian Empire a significant portion of its domain. The assassination of the Sasanian ruler Yazdegerd III (r. 632–651) in 651 marked the fall of the Sasanian Empire. Arab Muslim forces quickly attempted to stabilize their rule over the fallen empire's provinces by giving the administration of the captured settlements to their own officers. However, Islamization of the former Sasanian lands proved difficult.

Local Jewish, Christian, and Zoroastrian factions posed the greatest challenge through active resistance. The most aggressive resistance against Arab administration took place inside the Fars province. The majority of these insurgencies originated in Istakhr, a major multi-religious center in Fars. As a result, Arab suzerains also appointed local Iranian aristocrats as sub-governors in the Iranian cities with the highest unrest. Evidence of this cooperation is mainly based on numismatic evidence, due to the lack of written records about it.

Some of the coins minted under Farrokhzad has the inscription farroxzād ī gušanōšān ("Farrokhzad, Son of Gushn-Anosh"). Mentioning a father and son was a typical Iranian practice that appears on the majority of Arab–Sasanian coinage. Coinage reveals that Gushn-Anosh governed Istakhr in c. 689 under the authority of Umar ibn Ubayd Allah ibn Ma'mar. He was later succeeded by Farrokhzad, whom al-Muhallab ibn Abi Sufra gave a similar role in different cities within Fars between 695–699. The coins produced by both Gushn-Anosh and Farrokhzad indicate that they negotiated a pact with the Arab leaders. This pact secured their authority to mint coins in Istakhr, Ardashir-Khwarrah, and smaller neighboring settlements like Gor, Dasht, and Kavad-Khwarrah.

This cooperation reinforced the political control of the Arab governors Umar ibn Ubayd Allah ibn Ma'mar and al-Muhallab ibn Abi Sufra in Fars during a period where they were in conflict with Arab factions and there was potential for an uprising in Fars by local Iranians. The appearance of the names Farrokhzad and Gushn-Anosh on the edges of coins issued by Umar ibn Ubayd Allah ibn Ma'mar and al-Muhallab ibn Abi Sufra provides evidence for this treaty.

== Sources ==
- Gholami, Kiarash (2017). "On the Chronology and Coinage of Two Iranian Lords in the Umayyad Territories". DABIR. 4 (1). Brill: 40–50. doi:10.1163/29497833-00401006.
- Gignoux, Philippe (1986). Iranisches Personennamenbuch II, fasc. 2: Noms propres sassanides en moyen-perse épigraphique (in French). Austrian Academy of Sciences. ISBN 978-3700132080.
- Schmitt, Rüdiger (2021). "Personal names, Iranian v. Sasanian period". In Yarshater, Ehsan (ed.). Encyclopædia Iranica (Online ed.). Encyclopædia Iranica Foundation. ISSN 2156-2253.
