= Dara I =

Mythological Kayanian king of Iran

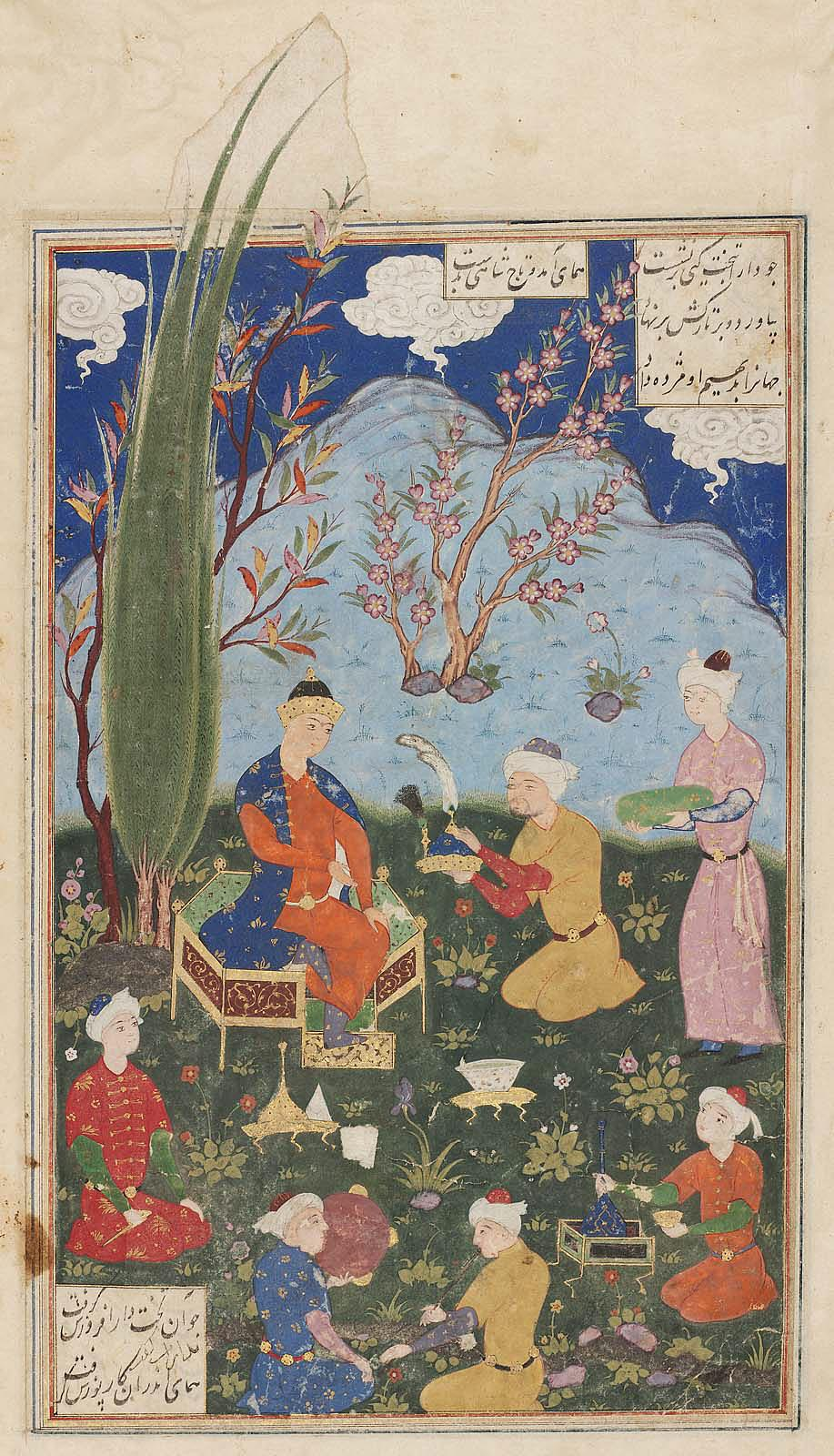
Dara I enthroned while receiving the crown brought by his mother, Humay Chehrzad. Folio from a copy of the Shahnameh, made in Safavid Iran during the early 16th-century

Dara I or Darab I was the penultimate king of the mythological Kayanian dynasty, ruling for 12 years. He was the son of Kay Bahman. Most accounts agree that Dara's mother was Humay Chehrzad, who had married her father, Kay Bahman. After Kay Bahman's death, Humay, who was pregnant with Dara, became the regent of the realm. Humay later hid the news of Dara's birth, and abandoned him on casket filled with expensive jewels on a river. The river has reported to have been the Euphrates, the Tigris, the Kor river in Fars, the Polvar river in Fars, or the Balkh river.

When Dara became older he eventually found his way back to Humay, who abdicated in his favor. Dara I was later succeeded by his son Dara II.

Dara I has been credited with the establishment of the Persian postal system, which is a reflection of the introduction or restructuring of the postal system by the Achaemenid King of Kings, Darius I the Great (r. 522–486 BC). The last Kayanian kings were usually connected with western Iran, as demonstrated by reports of Dara I using Babylon as his residence. Most sources credit Dara I with the foundation of the city of Darabgerd in Fars, while a few consider Dara II to have been its founder.

According to later sources, Dara I had a son named Firuzshah, whose achievements are mentioned in the Firuz-nameh by Haji Muhammad Bigami.

== Sources ==
- Tafazzoli, Ahmad (1994). "Dārā(b) (1)". Encyclopædia Iranica, online edition, Vol. VII, Fasc. 1. New York. pp. 1–2.

Preceded by Humay Chehrzad	King of the Kayanian dynasty	Succeeded by Dara II
