= Dara II =

Mythical king

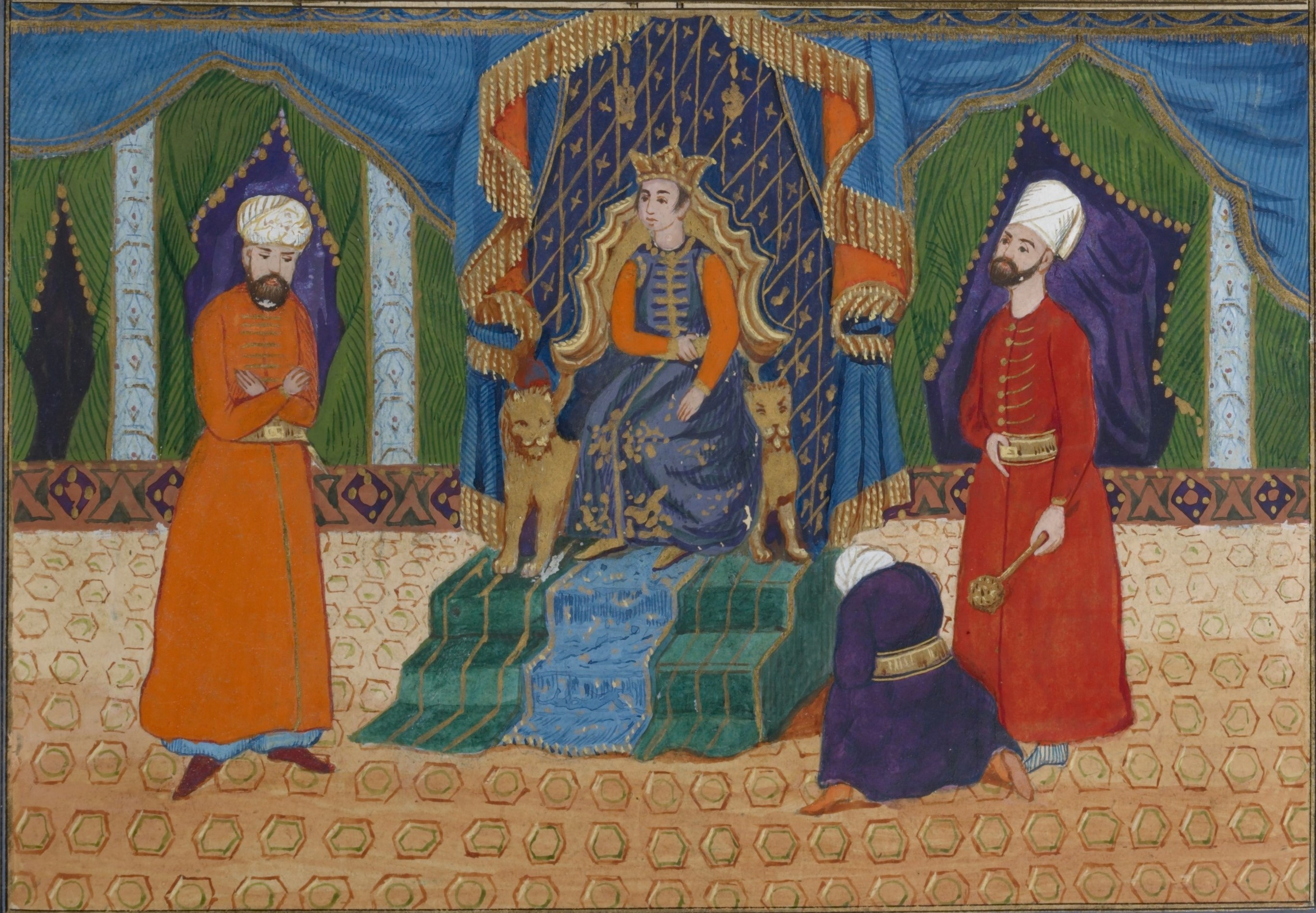
17th-century Shahnameh illustration of Dara II seated on his throne

Dara II or Darab II was the last king of the mythological Kayanian dynasty, ruling between 14 and 16 years. He is generally identified with Darius III (r. 336–330 BC), the last king of the Achaemenid Empire. In Middle Persian literature and Islamic chronicles, he is generally known as "Dara", while he is known as "Darab" in the New Persian proses Darab-nama and Iskandar-nama. He was the son and successor of Dara I.

According to early traditions, Dara II's mother was Mahnahid, daughter of Hazarmard, while later traditions refer her to as Thamrusia, a Greek woman who was the daughter of Fastabiqun and former wife of the king of Oman. Dara II was the half-brother of Iskandar (Alexander the Great), who, after refusing to pay tribute, rebelled. During the rebellion, Dara II was assassinated by his ministers Mahyar and Janushyar (Bessus and Nabarzanes). He had three sons, Ashk, Ardashir, and a third, whose name is uncertain. The Sasanian monarchs of Iran (224–651) invented a descent that traced them back to Dara II through a son named Sasan (called "the elder"). The House of Ispahbudhan, one of the Seven Great Houses of Iran, likewise claimed descent from Dara II through their Arsacid lineage. The Safavid ruler Ismail I (r. 1501–1524) claimed to be the personification of the divine light of investiture (farr) that had radiated in Dara II.

Dara II is credited with the foundation of the city of Dara in Mesopotamia, and in some cases the city of Darabgerd in Fars.

== Sources ==
- Briant, Pierre (2015), Darius in the Shadow of Alexander, Harvard University Press, ISBN 9780674745209
- Hanaway, William L. (1994). "Dārāb-nāma". Encyclopædia Iranica, online edition, Vol. VII, Fasc. 1. New York. pp. 8–9.
- Mitchell, Colin P. (2009). The Practice of Politics in Safavid Iran: Power, Religion and Rhetoric. I.B.Tauris. pp. 1–304. ISBN 978-0857715883.
- Olbrycht, Marek Jan (2016). "Dynastic Connections in the Arsacid Empire and the Origins of the House of Sāsān". In Curtis, Vesta Sarkhosh; Pendleton, Elizabeth J.; Alram, Michael; Daryaee, Touraj (eds.). The Parthian and Early Sasanian Empires: Adaptation and Expansion. Oxbow Books. ISBN 9781785702082.
- Shahbazi, A. Shapur (1989). "Besṭām o Bendōy". Encyclopaedia Iranica, Vol. IV, Fasc. 2. pp. 180–182.
- Tafazzoli, Ahmad (1994). "Dārā(b) (1)". Encyclopædia Iranica, online edition, Vol. VII, Fasc. 1. New York. pp. 1–2.

Preceded by Dara I	King of the Kayanian dynasty	Succeeded by Iskandar (Alexander the Great)
