= Bazrangi =

2nd/3rd century dynasty of rulers in south western Iran

Bāzrangī
Origin
- Origin: Bazrangan
- Meaning: Mention in popular folktales of Iran that the word bāzrangī means "wild person".
- Region of origin: Southwestern Iran

Other names
- Variant forms: Bazrangids, Badhrangids

Bāzrangī (also known as Bazrangids or Badhrangids) is the attested family name of a dynasty of petty rulers in south western Iran (Persis) near the end of Arsacid Empire as well as the name of geographical districts.

== As Sasan's wife family ==
The lord Sasan who is named as the eponymous ancestor of the Sasanians took, according to Tabari, a wife from a family called "Bazrangi". The woman was called Rambehesht and according to Tabari "possessed beauty and perfection". She bore Sasan a son called Papak.

In the account of Tabari, Ardashir, the founder of Sassanid dynasty was sent for educational reasons, at the request of his father Papak, to Tīrī who was the eunuch of Gōčehr the king of Eṣṭaḵr. Later Ardashir succeeded Tīrī who was the chief officer (i.e. argbed) of Dārābgerd. Ardashir managed to make a number of local conquests and then wrote to his father to revolt against Gōčehr. Papak did so and killed Gōčehr and took his throne. This is the last time Tabari mentions about Gōčehr or the Bāzrangī family and other notices of Bāzrangī in later sources are all taken from Ṭabarī. There has not been found any coins naming Gōčehr or Bāzrangī.

There is a suggestion by S. Wikander that Bāzrang is not a name but rather a title with the etymology of "holding a mace", or "possessing miraculous power". This suggestion is unproven for R. N. Frye.

== As geographical district ==
The word Bāzrang has been used in other historical sources, such as Eṣṭaḵrī, to refer to a geographical district in the mountainous BoyerAhmad area where the Šīrīn and Šāḏkān rivers have their origin. R. Frye indicates that this district could be the one in the Pahlavi text Xusraw ud rēdag where excellent wine or must came from. Today however there are the villages upper Bāzrang and lower Bāzrang in the Behbahān district of the province of Ḵūzestān. There is also a mention in popular folktales of Iran that the word bāzrangī means wild person. The connection of the geographical name and other occurrences of the word is uncertain.

== See also ==
- Iranian people
- History of Iran
- Bajran bali
