= Gochihr =

Persian Bazrangid dynasty ruler (died 205/6)

Gochihr (also spelled Gozihr) was an Iranian dynast from the Bazrangid dynasty, who ruled Istakhr as a Parthian vassal in the early 3rd century. He was a prominent ruler during the last years of the Parthian empire which had been weakened by internal conflicts and war with the Romans. He was killed in 205 or 206 by the Iranian prince Pabag, who had conquered his domains.
