= Temple of Anahita, Istakhr =

Fire temples in Iran

The Temple of Anahita (Middle Persian: Ādur-Anāhīd) was an ancient fire temple in Istakhr dedicated to the worship of the Iranian goddess Anahid.

== History ==
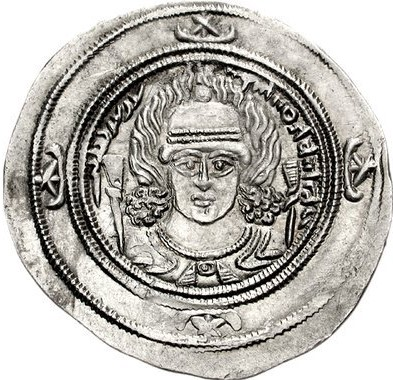
Coin minted under Khosrow II (r. 590–628), with the portrait of Anahita.

The temple was probably founded by the Achaemenid king of kings Artaxerxes II (r. 404 – 358 BC), who had shrines and statues of her constructed throughout his realm. The temple was ransacked by the Macedonians during Alexander the Great's conquests. At the start of the 3rd century AD, the temple was repaired and adorned by the Persian Sasanian family, who acted as the hereditary caretakers of the temple; Sasan, the eponymous ancestor of the family, is the first attested member to serve as the warden of the temple. The guardianship of the temple was of high importance to the Sasanians.

Ardashir I (r. 224–242), who overthrew the Parthian Empire and established the Sasanian control over the country, reportedly sent the heads of his enemies in his early campaigns to the temple, which was later repeated by Shapur II (r. 309–379), who had the heads of Christians stringed there in 340. Under Bahram II, the crown lost much of its religious authority, with the Zoroastrian priest Kartir receiving the guardianship of the Anahid temple. Narseh, who overthrew Bahram II's son and successor Bahram III in 293, may have restored the temple to their family. By Shapur II's reign, however, the Sasanian hold over the temple was certainly restored.

The last Sasanian emperor of Iran, Yazdegerd III, was crowned in the Anahid temple in 632.

== Sources ==
- Bivar, A. D. H. (1998). "Eṣṭaḵr i. History and Archaeology". Encyclopaedia Iranica, Vol. VIII, Fasc. 6. pp. 643–646.
- Boyce, M.; Chaumont, M. L.; Bier, C. (1989). "Anāhīd". Encyclopaedia Iranica, Vol. I, Fasc. 9. pp. 1003–1011.
- Boyce, Mary (1998). "Eṣṭaḵr ii. As a Zoroastrian Religious Center". Encyclopaedia Iranica, Vol. VIII, Fasc. 6. pp. 643–646.
- Canepa, Matthew (2018). "Staxr (Istakhr) and Marv Dasht Plain". In Nicholson, Oliver (ed.). The Oxford Dictionary of Late Antiquity. Oxford: Oxford University Press. ISBN 978-0-19-866277-8.
- Daryaee, Touraj (2012). "The Sasanian Empire (224–651)". In Daryaee, Touraj (ed.). The Oxford Handbook of Iranian History. Oxford University Press. ISBN 978-0199732159.
- Frye, R. N. (1983), "Chapter 4", The political history of Iran under the Sasanians, The Cambridge History of Iran, vol. 3, Cambridge University Press, ISBN 978-0-521-20092-9
- Kia, Mehrdad (2016). The Persian Empire: A Historical Encyclopedia [2 volumes]. ABC-CLIO. ISBN 978-1610693912.
- Sauer, Eberhard (2017). Sasanian Persia: Between Rome and the Steppes of Eurasia. London and New York: Edinburgh University Press. pp. 1–336. ISBN 9781474401029.
- Shahbazi, A. Shapur (2009). "Persepolis". Encyclopaedia Iranica.
- Shahbazi, A. Shapur (1988). "Bahrām II". Encyclopaedia Iranica, Vol. III, Fasc. 5. pp. 514–522.
- Streck, M.; Miles, G.C. (2012). "Iṣṭak̲h̲r". In P. Bearman; Th. Bianquis; C.E. Bosworth; E. van Donzel; W.P. Heinrichs (eds.). The Encyclopedia of Islam, Second Edition. Brill Online. doi:10.1163/1573-3912_islam_SIM_3672.
- Wiesehöfer, Joseph (1986). "Ardašīr I i. History". Encyclopaedia Iranica, Vol. II, Fasc. 4. pp. 371–376.
