= Bazrangan =

Bazrangan بازرنگان
- Village
- Location within Iran
- Coordinates: 29°45′34″N 51°33′17″E
- Country: Iran
- Province: Fars
- County: Kazerun
- Bakhsh: Chenar Shahijan
- Rural District: Anarestan

Population (2006)
  - Total: 392
- Time zone: UTC+3:30 (IRST)
  - Summer (DST): UTC+4:30 (IRDT)

Bazrangan (Persian: بازرنگان, also Romanized as Bāzrangān) is a village in Anarestan Rural District, Chenar Shahijan District, Kazerun County, Fars province, Iran. At the 2006 census, its population was 392, in 74 families.
