= Humay Chehrzad =

Kayanian dynasty queen

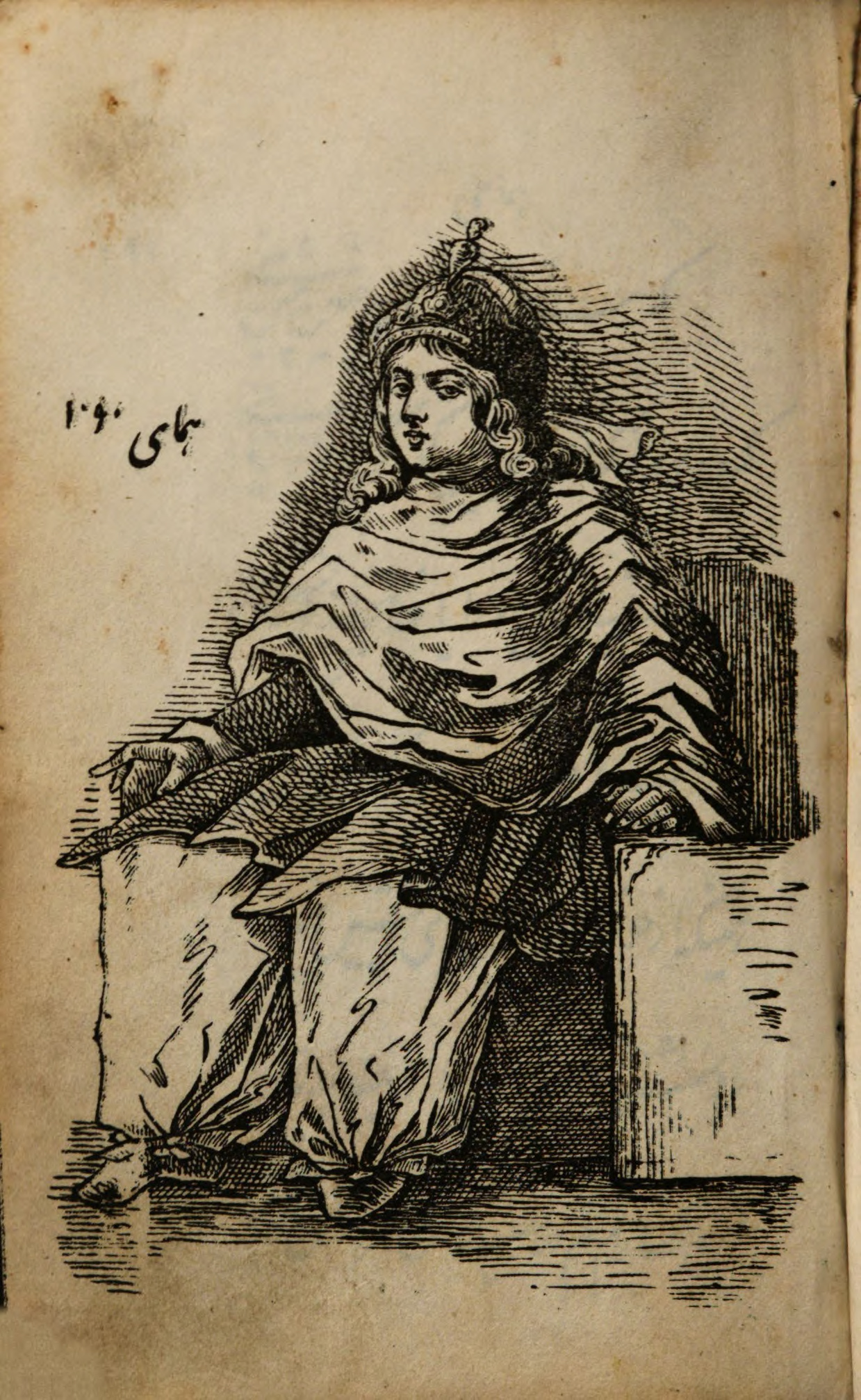
Qajar-era illustration of Humay Chehrzad

Humay-ē Chehrzad (Middle Persian: Humag, Avestan: Humāiiā) was a legendary Kayanian dynasty queen of Iran for around 32 years. She was daughter and perhaps also wife (sources vary) of Kay Bahman.

== Rule ==
Bahman becomes ill when Humay is 6 months pregnant, and upon realizing that his death is imminent, appoints Humay as vice-regent until the birth of her child. She ascended to the throne and ruled Iran after the death of Bahman. After her ascension, she gives birth to a son, Kai Darab, whom she keeps hidden for 8 months. Eventually she places Darab in a box and sets it to float down the Euphrates, where he is found by a dyer, who saves Darab and raises him.

During Humay's reign, a Greek army assaults the western edges of the Iranian Empire, and Humay sends an army under Rashnwad to fight them. During this conflict, Rashnwad finds Darab, and recognizes him as Humay's child. When they return to the capital after defeating the Romans, Humay retires and hands the throne down to her son after 32 years of rule.

Al-Maqrizi said her name was also Šihrāzād, and identified her with Semiramis.

== Sources ==
- Emrani, Haleh (2009). Like Father, Like Daughter: Late Sasanian Imperial Ideology & the Rise of Bōrān to Power. University of California.

Preceded by Kai Bahman	Legendary Kings of the Shāhnāma; 32 years (3103–3135 after Keyumars)	Succeeded by Kai Darab
