= David Bivar =

British numismatist and archaeologist (1926–2015)

Adrian David Hugh Bivar, FRAS (abbreviated A.D.H. Bivar) (1926 - 2015) was a British numismatist and archaeologist, who was Emeritus Professor of Iranian Studies at the School of Oriental and African Studies, University of London. He specialized in Sasanian seals and rock reliefs, Kushano-Sasanian coins and chronology, Mithraic iconography, Arsacid history and pre-Islamic folklore. His written works include book chapters written for the Fischer Weltgeschichte (vol.16, 1966) and The Cambridge History of Iran (1983).
