= Darab =

City in Fars province, Iran

Darab Persian: داراب
- City
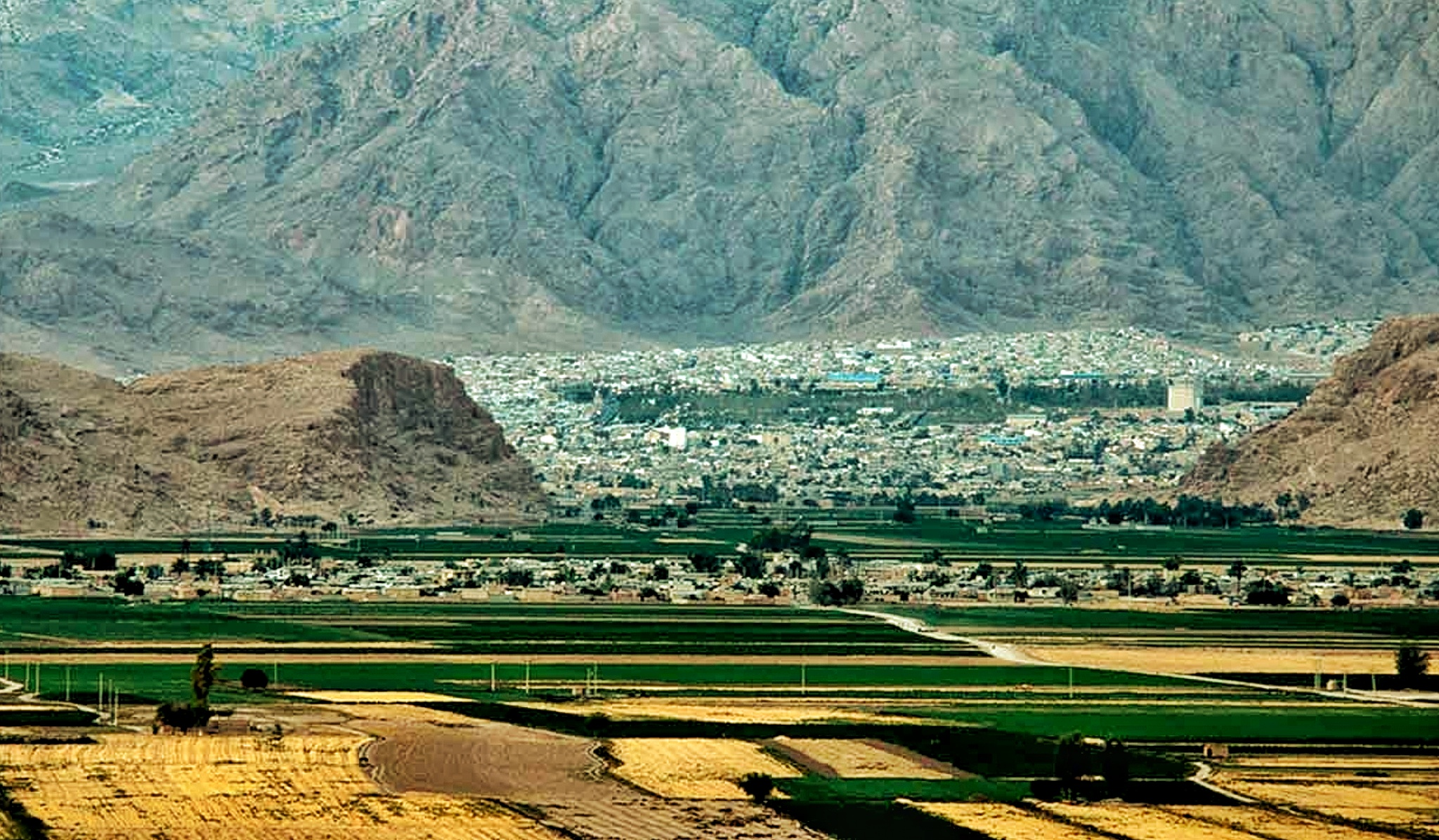

- Location within Iran
- Coordinates: 28°45′19″N 54°33′12″E
- Country: Iran
- Province: Fars
- County: Darab
- District: Central

Population (2016)
  - Total: 70,232
- Time zone: UTC+3:30 (IRST)

Darab (Persian: داراب) (Note: Also romanized as Dārāb, formerly Darábgerd or Darabkert (city of Darius)) is a city in the Central District of Darab County, Fars province, Iran, serving as capital of both the county and the district.

== History ==
Darab is one of the oldest cities in Iran, and is mentioned in the Persian epic Shahname by Ferdowsi. Legend ascribes the foundation of the city to Darius I, hence its earlier name Daráb-gerd (Darius-town).

In the neighborhood there are various remains, including the Kalah i Daráb (citadel of Darius), which consists of a series of earthworks arranged in a circle around an isolated rock. Another monument in the vicinity is a giant bas-relief, carved on the vertical face of a rock, representing the victory of the Sasanian king Shapur I over the Roman emperor Valerian in 260 A.D.

According to Hamza al-Isfahani, the city was triangular in design, and the circular defensive wall, which has been uncovered, was built in the 8th century by a governor of Fars under Hajjaj ibn Yusuf. The circle is irregular, and about 1,900 m in diameter.

During most of the Middle Ages, the city remained the capital of a large district. The city's products included textiles, jasmine oil, various mineral salts, and mumiya, a mineral exudate.

== Demographics ==
=== Population ===
At the time of the 2006 National Census, the city's population was 54,513 in 13,279 households. The following census in 2011 counted 61,672 people in 16,930 households. The 2016 census measured the population of the city as 70,232 people in 21,308 households.

== Climate ==
Darab has a hot semi-arid climate (BSh) according to the Köppen climate classification.

Climate data for Darab (1995-2005)
Month	Jan	Feb	Mar	Apr	May	Jun	Jul	Aug	Sep	Oct	Nov	Dec	Year
Mean daily maximum °C (°F)	16.1 (61.0)	19.1 (66.4)	23.0 (73.4)	28.8 (83.8)	35.8 (96.4)	40.2 (104.4)	41.7 (107.1)	40.7 (105.3)	37.3 (99.1)	31.9 (89.4)	24.5 (76.1)	19.0 (66.2)	29.8 (85.7)
Daily mean °C (°F)	9.9 (49.8)	12.7 (54.9)	16.0 (60.8)	21.0 (69.8)	27.1 (80.8)	31.4 (88.5)	34.0 (93.2)	33.0 (91.4)	28.6 (83.5)	23.1 (73.6)	16.4 (61.5)	12.1 (53.8)	22.1 (71.8)
Mean daily minimum °C (°F)	3.9 (39.0)	6.4 (43.5)	9.0 (48.2)	13.2 (55.8)	18.4 (65.1)	22.6 (72.7)	26.3 (79.3)	25.3 (77.5)	19.9 (67.8)	14.3 (57.7)	8.3 (46.9)	5.2 (41.4)	14.4 (57.9)
Average precipitation mm (inches)	75.0 (2.95)	45.5 (1.79)	52.6 (2.07)	16.8 (0.66)	0.4 (0.02)	1.9 (0.07)	2.2 (0.09)	2.9 (0.11)	0.4 (0.02)	1.0 (0.04)	6.4 (0.25)	52.3 (2.06)	257.4 (10.13)
Average relative humidity (%)	61	56	51	39	25	21	24	25	27	30	42	54	38
Mean monthly sunshine hours	225.1	223.6	261.7	283.2	352.0	346.9	337.0	337.9	318.7	312.1	259.2	236.3	3,493.7
Source: IRIMO(humidity 1995-2005)

== Agriculture ==
Major city products are wheat, citrus, cotton, maize and palm.

== Higher education ==
The city has five universities: Islamic Azad University, Darab Branch; Payame Noor University, Darab center; agriculture and national resources school of Darab; Paramedical school of Darab; and a branch of the Technical and Vocational University.

== In literature ==
In the notes to his long mystical poem The Kasidah (1880), Sir Richard Francis Burton describes his alter ego "Haji Abdu El-Yezdi" as being a native of Darab.
