= List of Muslim states and dynasties =

The following article includes a list of successive Islamic states and Muslim dynasties beginning with the time of the Islamic prophet Muhammad (570–632 CE) and the early Muslim conquests that spread Islam outside of the Arabian Peninsula, and continuing through to the present day.

The first-ever establishment of an Islamic polity goes back to the Islamic State of Medina, which was established by Muhammad in the city of Medina in 622 CE. Following his death in 632 CE, his immediate successors established the Rashidun Caliphate.

After that Muslim dynasties rose; some of these dynasties established notable and prominent Muslim empires, such as the Umayyad Empire and later the Abbasid Empire, Ottoman Empire centered around Anatolia, the Safavid Empire of Persia, and the Mughal Empire in India.

== By land area ==
No	Dynasty/State	Land area	Today part of	Period
1	Abbasid Caliphate	11.1m² km	Iraq; Saudi Arabia; Syria; Iran; Egypt; Yemen; Algeria; Oman; Bahrain; Qatar; United Arab Emirates; Jordan; Lebanon; Palestine; Russia; Israel; Libya; Tunisia; Pakistan; Azerbaijan; Turkey; Armenia India; Kuwait; Afghanistan; Tajikistan; Uzbekistan; Kazakhstan; Turkmenistan; Kyrgyzstan; Cyprus; Georgia; China	750–1258 1261–1517
2	Umayyad Caliphate	11.1m² km	Iraq; Saudi Arabia; Syria; Iran; Egypt; Yemen; Algeria; Oman; Bahrain; Qatar; United Arab Emirates; France; Spain; Portugal; Morocco; Western Sahara; Jordan; Lebanon; Palestine; Israel; Uzbekistan; Kyrgyzstan; Libya; Russia; Tunisia; Pakistan; Azerbaijan; Turkey; Armenia India; Kuwait; Afghanistan; Tajikistan; Cyprus; Georgia	661–750
3	Rashidun Caliphate	6.4m² km	Iraq; Saudi Arabia; Syria; Iran; Egypt; Yemen; Algeria; Oman; Bahrain; Qatar; United Arab Emirates; Jordan; Lebanon; Palestine; Israel; Libya; Tunisia; Russia; Pakistan; Azerbaijan; Turkey; Armenia; Kuwait; Afghanistan	632–661
4	Golden Horde	6.0m² km	Russia; Ukraine; Kazakhstan; Kyrgyzstan; Hungary; Poland; Moldova; Bulgaria	1313–1502 (Islamic)
5	Ottoman Empire	5.2m² km	Turkey; Greece; Egypt; Syria; Albania; Lebanon; Armenia; Algeria; Hungary; Bulgaria; Iraq; Bosnia and Herzegovina; Cyprus; Russia; Ukraine; Saudi Arabia; Iran; Libya; Palestine; Israel; Jordan; Romania; Sudan; Somalia; Ethiopia; Djibouti; Yemen; Kuwait; Tunisia; Azerbaijan; Georgia; Moldova; Slovenia; Slovakia; Poland; Serbia; Kosovo; Bulgaria; Croatia; North Macedonia; Eritrea; Montenegro	1299–1922
6	Timurid Empire	4.4m² km	Uzbekistan; China; Pakistan; Iran; Afghanistan; India; Azerbaijan; Armenia; Russia; Georgia; Syria; Iraq; Kyrgyzstan; Kazakhstan; Turkmenistan; Tajikistan; Turkey	1370–1507
7	Fatimid Caliphate	4.1m² km	Egypt; Palestine; Lebanon; Jordan; Algeria; Morocco; Tunisia; Libya; Saudi Arabia; Iraq; Syria; Turkey; Italy; Sudan; Israel; Chad; Niger	909–1171
8	Mughal Empire	4.0m² km	India; Pakistan; Bangladesh; Afghanistan	1526–1857
9	Seljuk Empire	3.9m² km	Iran; Syria; Iraq; Oman; United Arab Emirates; Bahrain; Qatar; Afghanistan; Tajikistan; Turkmenistan; Turkey; Lebanon; Palestine; Israel; Jordan; Azerbaijan; Georgia	1037–1194
10	Ilkhanate	3.75m² km	Iran; Syria; Turkey; Azerbaijan; Pakistan; Afghanistan; Tajikistan; Armenia; Georgia; Turkmenistan	1295–1335 (Islamic)
11	Khwarazmian Empire	3.6m² km	Iran; Azerbaijan; China; Pakistan; Afghanistan; Turkmenistan; Tajikistan; Uzbekistan; Kyrgyzstan; Kazakhstan	1077–1231
12	Chagatai Khanate	3.5m² km	China; Uzbekistan; Turkmenistan; Kazakhstan; Kyrgyzstan; Afghanistan; Mongolia; Russia	1347–1660 (Islamic)
13	Ghaznavid Empire	3.4m² km	Afghanistan; Iran; Pakistan; India; Turkmenistan; Tajikistan; Uzbekistan	977–1186
14	Delhi Sultanate	3.2m²km	India; Pakistan; Bangladesh; Afghanistan	1206–1526
15	Safavid Empire	2.9m² Km	Iran; Afghanistan; Azerbaijan; Pakistan; Russia; Tajikistan; Iraq; Syria	1501–1736
16	Samanid Dynasty	2.85m² km	Afghanistan; Iran Kazakhstan; Kyrgyzstan; Pakistan; Tajikistan; Turkmenistan; Uzbekistan	819–999
17	Saffarid Dynasty	2.85m² km	Afghanistan; Pakistan; Iran; Tajikistan; Turkmenistan; Uzbekistan	861–1003

== West Asia and North Africa ==
=== Mesopotamia and Levant (Iraq, Jordan, Lebanon, Palestine, Syria) ===
- Umayyad Caliphate (661–750; based in Damascus)
- Abbasid Caliphate (750–1258; based in Baghdad)
- Ayyubid Dynasty (1171–1341; based in Damascus and Aleppo)
- Zengid Dynasty (1127–1250; based in Aleppo)
- Annazids (991–1258; Kurdistan)
- Burid Dynasty (1104–1154)
- Hamdanid dynasty (890–1004; based in Aleppo)
- Uqaylid Dynasty (990–1096; Syria, Iraq)
- Bani Assad (990–1081; Iraq)
- Numayrid (990–1081; Syria, Turkey)
- Marwanid (983–1085; Syria, Turkey, Armenia, Iraq)
- Mirdasid dynasty (1024–1080; Syria)
- Artuqids (1101–1409; Syria, Turkey, Iraq)
- Baban (1649–1851; Iraq)
- Soran Emirate (1816–1835; Iraq)
- Emirate of Hakkari (1380s–1845; Turkey, Syria)
- Bahdinan (1339–1843; Iraq)
- Bohtan (1330–1855)
- Principality of Bitlis (1182–1847)
- Hadhabani (906–1070)
- Mukriyan (1050–1500)
- Qarghuyah, Emirate of Aleppo (969–977)
- Nizari Ismaili State (1090–1256; Iraq, Iran, Syria)
- Emirate of Aleppo (1004–1016)
- Assaf dynasty (1306–1591; Lebanon)
- Harfush dynasty (1517–1865; Lebanon, Syria)
- Principality of Basra (1597-1668; Iraq)
- Emirate of Muntafiq (1530-1914; Southern Iraq)
- Kingdom of Khaza'il (1534-1921; Iraq, Iran, Kuwait)
- Mamluk Principality of Iraq (1704–1831)
- Emirate of Mosul (905–1096, 1127–1222, 1254–1383, 1758–1918)
- Emirate of Transjordan (1921–1946; Jordan, Saudi Arabia, Iraq)
- Arab Kingdom of Syria (1920)
- Kingdom of Iraq (1921–1958)
- Kingdom of Jordan (1921–present)

=== Arabian Peninsula and Persian Gulf ===
Saudi Arabia

- Rashidun Caliphate (632–661)
- Banu Ukhaidhir (865–1066)
- Emirate of Mecca (1916–1924) Saudi State
- Emirate of Riyadh (1903–1918) Saudi State
- Manfuha Sheikhdom (1682–1834)
- Abu Arish Sheikhdom (1200–1863)
- Al Bir Sheikhdom (1600–1850)
- Al Rawdah Sheikhdom (1697–1790)
- Al-Kharj Emirate (1688–1865)
- Unaizah Emirate (1768–1904)
- Buraidah Emirate (1768–1913)
- Awdah Sheikhdom (1700–1790)
- Jalajil Sheikhdom (1762–1831)
- Harmah Sheikhdom (1700–1779)
- Al Majma'ah Sheikhdom (1758–1908)
- Shaqra Sheikhdom (1803–1834)
- Mutayr Sheikhdom (1872–1903)
- 'Asir Sheikhdom (983–1003, 1728–1863)
- Sheikdom of Upper Asir (1802–1923)
- Sheikhdom of Lower 'Asir (1830–1930)
- Principality of Najran (1633–1934)
- 'Uyayna Sheikhdom (1446–1768)
- Dhurma Sheikhdom (1600–1757)
- Gatgat Sultanate (1900–1924)
- Al Murrah Emirate (1900–1917)
- Emirate of Diriyah (1744–1818; First Saudi State)
- Emirate of Nejd (1818–1891; Second Saudi State)
- Third Saudi state (1902–present)
- Sharifate of Mecca (968–1925)
- Emirate of Jabal Shammar (1836–1921)
- Idrisid Emirate of Asir (1909–1930)
- Kingdom of Hejaz (1916–1925)
- Bani Khalid (1669–1796)
- House of Saud (1744–present)

Bahrain

- Qarmatians (899–1077)
- Uyunid Kingdom (1076–1253)
- Usfurid (1253–1320)
- Jarwanid (1305–1487)
- Jabrids (1480–1570)
- Bani Khalid (1669–1796)
- House of Khalifa (1783–present)

Qatar

- House of Thani (1825–present)

Kuwait

- House of Al-Sabah (1752–present)

United Arab Emirates

- Emirate of Abu Dhabi (1761–present)
- Emirate of Ajman (1816–present)
- Emirate of Dubai (1833–present)
- Emirate of Fujairah (1876–present)
- Emirate of Ras Al Khaimah (1727–present)
- Emirate of Sharjah (1803–present)
- Emirate of Umm Al Quwain (1775–present)
- Dibba (1871–1953)
- Hamriyya (1875–1922)
- Hira (1915–1942)
- Kalba (1871–1952)

Oman

- Sultanate of Zafar (1421–1975)
- Imamate of Oman (750–1696)
- Omani Empire (1696–1856)
- Sultanate of Muscat and Oman (1820–1970)
- Sultanate of Oman (1970–present)

Yemen

- Mutawakkilite Kingdom of Yemen (1918–1970)
- Zurayids (1083–1174)
- Hamdanids (1099–1174)
- Sulaymanids (1063–1174)
- Mahdids (1159–1174)
- Sulayhid dynasty (1047–1138)
- Rassids of Yemen (897–1962)
- Rasulid of Yemen (1229–1454)
- Najahid dynasty (1022–1158)
- Ziyadid dynasty (819–856)
- Tahirid dynasty (1454–1517)
- Bani Ukhaidhir (865–1066)
- Yufirids (847–997)
- Yemeni Zaidi State (1547–1849)
- Alawi Sheikhdom (1743–1967)
- Aqrabi Sheikhdom (1770–1967)
- Audhali Sultanate (1750–1970)
- Lower Aulaqi Sultanate (1700–1967)
- Upper Aulaqi Sheikhdom (1750–1967)
- Upper Aulaqi Sultanate (1700–1967)
- Beihan Emirate (1680–1967)
- Sheikhdom of al-Hawra (1858–1967)
- Emirate of Dhala (1750–1967)
- Dathina Sheikhdom (1947–1967)
- Fadhli Sultanate (1670–1967)
- Sultanate of Haushabi (1730–1967)
- Lahej Sultanate (1728–1967)
- Maflahi Sheikhdom (1850–1967)
- Sheikhdom of Shaib (1850–1967)
- Sultanate of Lower Yafa (1681–1967)
- Sultanate of Upper Yafa (1800–1967)
- Sheikhdom Al-Dhubi (1750–1967)
- Hadrami Sheikhdom (1820–1967)
- Emirate of Mawsata (1780–1967)
- Sheikhdom of al-Irqa (1800–1967)
- Mahra Sultanate (1432–1967)
- Kathiri Sultanate (1395–1967)
- Sultanate of Tarim (1916–1945)
- Qu'aiti Sultanate (1858–1967)
- Ash Shihr (1752–1858)
- Al Mukalla (1707–1881)

Regional

- Tulunids (868–905; Egypt, Syria)
- Rassids (897–1962)
- Qarmatian Kingdom (899–976)
- Sharifate of Mecca (968–1925)
- Ayyubid Dynasty (1171–1260)
- Rasulids (1229–1454)
- Mamluk Dynasty (1250–1517)
- Omani Sultanate (1696–1856)
- Kingdom of Saudi Arabia (1932–present)

=== North Africa (Algeria, Egypt, Libya, Morocco, Tunisia) ===
- Rustamid dynasty (777–909)
- Idrisid dynasty(788-974)
- Aghlabid dynasty (800–909; Ifriqiya, Tunisia, East-Algeria, West-Libya, Sicily)
- Fatimid Calipate (909–1171; North Africa, Middle East)
- Zirid dynasty (972–1148)
- Almoravid dynasty (1040–1147; Maghreb, Spain)
- Almohad dynasty (1121–1269)
- Ayyubid dynasty (1171–1254)
- Hafsid dynasty (1229–1574)
- Nasrid dynasty (1232–1492; Granada, Ceuta)
- Marinid dynasty (1244–1465)
- Abbasid Caliph (1250–1517; North Africa, Middle East) under Mamluk Sultanate of Cairo
- Wattasid dynasty (1472–1554)
- Saadi dynasty (1511–1628)
- Alaouite dynasty (1631–present)

Algeria

- Emirate of Tlemcen (736–790)
- Emirate of Cordoba (756–929)
- Rustamid dynasty (777–909)
- Banu Ifran (830–1040)
- Fatimid dynasty (909–1171)
- Zirid dynasty (972–1148)
- Confederation of Banu Mzab (1012–1882)
- Hammadid dynasty (1014–1152)
- Kingdom of Tlemcen (1235–1556)
- Hafsid Emirate of Be’jaîa (1285–1510)
- Zab Emirate (1402)
- Sultanate of Tuggurt (1414–1854)
- Kingdom of Ait Abbas (1510–1872)
- Kingdom of Kuku (1515–1638)
- Kingdom of Algiers (1515–1837)
- Emirate of Abdelkader (1832–1847)
- Zenata Kingdoms

Egypt

- Tulunids (868–905)
- Fatimid dynasty (909–1171)
- Ikhshidids (935–969)
- Banu Kanz (1004–1412)
- Ayyubid dynasty (1171–1254)
- Mamluk dynasty (1250–1517)
- Abbasid Caliph (1250–1517) under Mamluk Sultanate of Cairo
- Khedivate of Egypt (1867–1914)
- Sultanate of Egypt (1914–1922)
- Kingdom of Egypt (1922–1953)

Tunisia

- Aghlabid dynasty (800–909)
- Khurasanid dynasty (1059–1158)
- Hafsid Kingdom (1229–1574)
- Hafsid Kingdom of Béjaïa
- Beylik of Tunis (1573–1613)
- Muradid dynasty (1613–1705)
- Husaynid dynasty (1705–1956)
- Kingdom of Tunisia (1956–1957)

Morocco

- Emirate of Nekor (710–1019)
- Emirate of Sijilmasa (758–1055)
- Muhallabids (771–793, Ifriqiya)
- Idrisid dynasty (788–974)
- Almoravid dynasty (1040–1147)
- Almohad dynasty (1121–1269 CE)
- Marinid Sultanate (1244–1465, Maghreb)
- Wattasid dynasty (1472–1554)
- Saadi Sultanate (1549–1659)
- Pashalik of Timbuktu (1591–1833; Western Sahara, Maghreb, Mali)
- Naqsid principality of Tetouan (1597–1673)
- Republic of Bou Regreg (1627–1668)
- Alaouite dynasty (1666–present)
- Republic of the Rif (1921–1926)
- Zenata Kingdoms

Libya

- Sultanate of Fezzan (918–1190)
- Banu Khattab (918–1177)
- Banu Khazrun (1001–1146)
- Banu Sulaym Emirate (11th Century)
- Emirate of Banu Talis (1228–1551)
- Banu Makki (1282–1392)
- Sultanate of Tripolitania (1327–1401) under Bani Ammar
- Pasha of Tripoli (1551–1711)
- Kingdom of Fezzan (1556–1856) under Awlad Muhammad dynasty
- Karamanli dynasty (1711–1835)
- Senussi Kingdom (1843–1942)
- Tripolitanian Republic (1918–1922)
- Cyrenaica Emirate (1949–1951)
- Kingdom of Libya (1951–1969)

== Horn of Africa ==
Somalia

- Warsangali Sultanate (1613–1920)
- Tunni Sultanate (900–1300)
- Mogadishu Sultanate (900–1600)
- Ajuran Sultanate (1300–1798)
- Hiraab Imamate (1600–1889)
- Majeerteen Sultanate (1600–1927)
- Geledi Sultanate (1695–1911)
- Hobyo Sultanate (1870–1927)
- Sultanate of Showa (896–1286)
- Sultanate of Ifat (1275–1403)
- Adal Sultanate (1415–1577)
- Isaaq Sultanate (1749–1884)
- Habr Yunis Sultanate (1769–1917)
- Zeila Emirate (1415–1420)
- Harla Kingdom (501–1500)
- Sultanate of Dawaro (915–1329)
- Sharifate of Ramayyid (1700–1889)
- Islamic Wilayaat of Somalia (2008–present)

Ethiopia

- Harla Kingdom (501–1500)
- Sultanate of Showa (896–1285)
- Sultanate of Dawaro (915–1329)
- Sultanate of Bale (1200–1324)
- Sultanate of Arababni (1200–1314)
- Hadiya Sultanate (1200–1495)
- Sultanate of Ifat (1285–1415)
- Fatagar (1400–1650)
- Adal Sultanate (1415–1577)
- Sultanate of Harar (1526–1577)
- Imamate of Aussa (1557–1672)
- Emirate of Harar (1647–1887)
- Sultanate of Aussa (1734–present)
- Isaaq Sultanate (1750–1884)
- Habr Yunis Sultanate (1769–1907)
- Wollo Kingdom (1760–1896)
- Kingdom of Gimma (1770–1902)
- Kingdom of Gumma (1770–1902)
- Kingdom of Jimma (1790–1932)
- Gobaad Sultanate (1800–present)
- Kingdom of Limmu-Ennarea (1801–1890)
- Kingdom of Gera (1835–1887)

Eritrea

- Sultanate of Dahlak (1050–1557)
- Beja Kingdom (930–1500)

Djibouti

- Tadjoura Sultanate (1450–present)
- Rahayta Sultanate (1600–present)

== Iranian Plateau ==
Iran

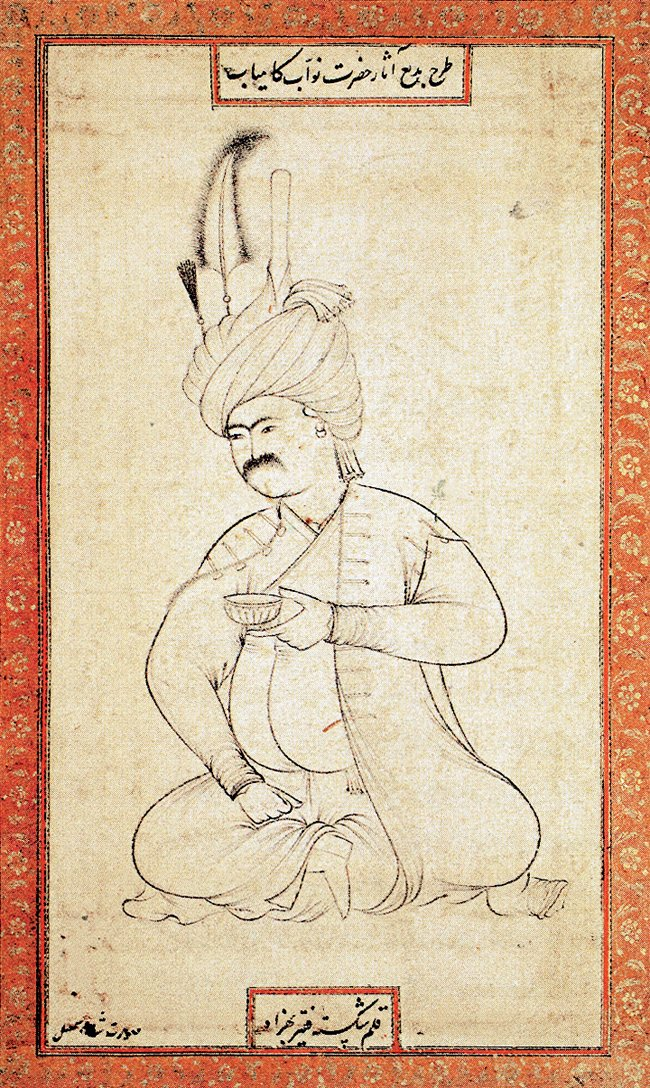
Shah Ismail I, founder of Safavid dynasty

- Paduspanid (665–1598)
- Dulafid dynasty (800–898, Jibal)
- Justanids (805–1004)
- Samanid Empire (819–999)
- Tahirid dynasty (821–873)
- Qarinvand dynasty (823–1110)
- Saffarid dynasty (861–1003)
- Shirvanshah (861–1538)
- Alavid dynasty (864–928)
- Sajid dynasty (889–929)
- Ma'danids (890–1110, Makran)
- Aishanids (912–961)
- Sallarid dynasty (919–1062)
- Ziyarid dynasty (928–1043)
- Banu Ilyas (932–968)
- Buyid dynasty (934–1062)
- Rawadid dynasty (955–1071, Tabriz)
- Hasanwayhid (959–1015)
- Annazids (990–1180; Iran, Iraq)
- Ma'munid dynasty (995–1017)
- Kakuyid (1008–1141)
- Great Seljuq Empire (1029–1194)
- Nasrid dynasty (Sistan) (1029–1225)
- Kerman Seljuk Sultanate (1041–1187)
- Hormuz Kingdom (1060–1622)
- Khwarezmian Empire under Khwarezm-Shâh dynasty (1077–1231)
- Nizari Ismaili state (1090–1256)
- Ahmadilis (1122–1220)
- Eldiguzids (1135–1225)
- Atabegs of Yazd (1141–1319)
- Salghurids (1148–1282, Shiraz)
- Hazaraspids (1155–1424)
- Khorshidi dynasty (1155–1597, Lorestan)
- Qutlugh-Khanids (1222–1306)
- Mihrabanid dynasty (1236–1537, Baluchistan)
- Kart dynasty (1244–1381)
- Ilkhanate (Mongol) (1295–1357)
- Muzaffarids (1314–1393)
- Sarbadars (1332–1386)
- Chupanids (1335–1357)
- Injuids (1335–1357)
- Jalayirid Sultanate (1335–1432)
- Afrasiyab dynasty (1349–1504)
- Marashis (1359–1596)
- Kara Koyunlu (1374–1468)
- Ak Koyunlu (1378–1501)
- Musha'sha'iyyah (1436–1729)
- Talysh Khanate (1747–1832)
- Maku Khanate (1747–1922)
- Ardabil Khanate (1747–1808)
- Khalkhal Khanate (1747–1809)
- Khoy Khanate (1747–1813)
- Maragheh Khanate (1610–1925)
- Marand Khanate (1747–1828)
- Sarab Khanate (1747–1797)
- Tabriz Khanate (1747–1802)
- Urmia Khanate (1747–1865)
- Emirate of Muhammara (1740–1925)
- Safavid dynasty (1502–1736)
- Afsharid dynasty (1736–1796)
- Zand dynasty (1751–1794)
- Qajar dynasty (1789–1925)
- Pahlavi dynasty (1925–1979)

Anatolia (Turkey)

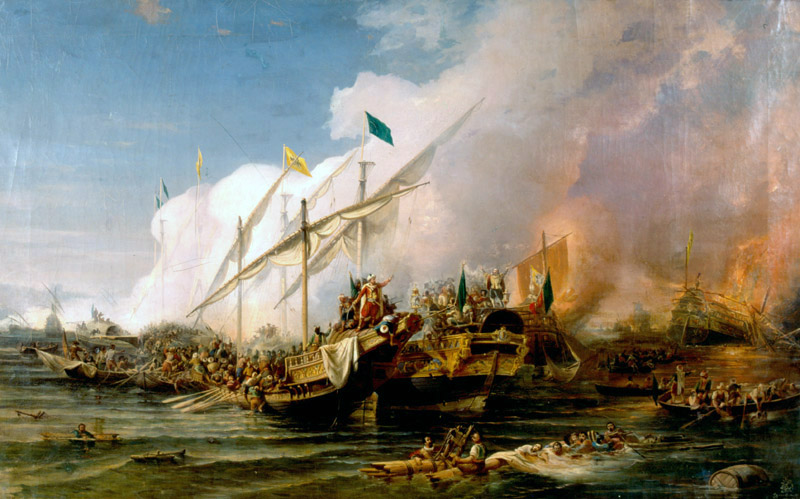
Barbarossa Hayreddin Pasha

- Great Seljuk Empire (1029–1194)
- Ottoman Empire (1299–1923)
- Seljuk Sultanate of Rûm (1077–1308)
- Danishmends Dynasty (1071–1178)
- Mengujekids Dynasty (1072–1277)
- Saltukids Dynasty (1071–1202)
- Artuqids Dynasty (1101–1409)
- Karamanids (1250–1487)
- Chaka of Smyrna (1081–1098)
- Shah-Armens (1100–1207)
- Beylik of Dilmac (1085–1398)
- Inalids (1095–1183)
- Beylik of Cubukogullari (1085–1112)
- Ahiler (1290–1362)
- Alaiye (1293–1471)
- Aydinids (1300–1425)
- Beyliks of Canik (1300–1460)
- Jandarids (1291–1461)
- Chobanids (1211–1309)
- Dulkadirids (1348–1522)
- Eretnids (1335–1390)
- Erzincan (1379–1410)
- Eshrefids (1285–1326)
- Germiyanids (1300–1429)
- Hamidids (1300–1391)
- Kadi Burhan al-Din (1381–1398)
- Karasids (1296–1357)
- Ladik (1262–1391)
- Mentese (1261–1424)
- Pervaneoglu (1277–1322)
- Ramadanids (1352–1608)
- Sahib Ataids (1275–1341)
- Sarukhanids (1300–1410)
- Teke (1321–1423)
- Emirate of Melitene (850–934)
- Amida (983–1085)
- Ayyubid dynasty (1171–1341)
- Zurarid Emirate of Arzen (850–930)
- Emirate of Bingöl (1231–1864)
- Emirate of Bradost (1510–1609)
- Emirate of Bitlis (1182–1815)
- Emirate of Çemiçgezek(1200–1663)
- Emirate of Hasankeyf (1232–1524)
- Emirate of Hakkari (1380–1847)
- Emirate of Pazooka (1499–1587)
- Emirate of Palu (1495–1850)

Azerbaijan

- Eldiguzids (1136–1225)
- Shirvanshah (1207–1607)
- Ak Koyunlu (1378–1501)
- Kara Koyunlu (1374–1468)
- Shamakhy Khanate (1721–1749)
- Salyan Khanate (1729–1782)
- Karabakh Khanate (1748–1822)
- Erivan Khanate (1747–1828)
- Afsharid dynasty (1736–1796)
- Safavid dynasty (1501–1736)
- Shaki Khanate (1743–1819)
- Ganja khanate (1747–1805)
- Quba Khanate (1726–1806)
- Baku Khanate (1735–1806)
- Khalkhal Khanate (1747–1809)
- Nakhichevan Khanate (1747–1828)
- Shirvan Khanate (1748–1820)
- Khoja Shamakha (1748–1786)
- Yeni Shamakha (1748–1786)
- Ardabil Khanate (1747–1808)
- Urmia Khanate (1747–1865)
- Javad Khanate (1747–1805)
- Shirvan Khanate (1748–1820)
- Talysh Khanate (1747–1828)
- Elisu Sultanate (1604–1844)
- Great Seljuk Empire (1037–1194)
- Derbent Khanate (1747–1806)
- Qajar dynasty (1789–1925)
- Shamakha ll (1786–1844)

Armenia

- Emirate of Armenia (697–700, 711–885)
- Erivan Khanate (1736–1827)
- Karabakh Khanate (1606–1806)
- Shaddadids (951–1199)
- Sallarid dynasty (919–1062)
- Sajid dynasty (889–929)
- Marwanid dynasty (983–1085)
- Eldiguzids (1135–1225)

Georgia

- Emirate of Tbilisi (736–1122)
- Principality of Abkhazia (1463–1864)

Caucasus

- Emirate of Derbent (654–1747)
- Caucasian Imamate (1828–1859)
- Chechen Republic of Ichkeria (1991–2000)
- Derbent Khanate (1747–1806)
- Avar Khanate (1240–1864)
- Gazikumukh Shamkhalate (740–1640)
- Shamkhalate of Tarki (1640–1867)
- Gazikumukh Khanate (1642–1860)
- Abazinia (1400–1800)
- North Caucasian Emirate (1919–1920)
- Circassia (1427–1864)
- Kabardia (1453–1825)

Afghanistan

- Farighunids (800–1010)
- Ghurids (879–1215)
- Ghaznavids (977–1186)
- Kart dynasty (1244–1381, based in Herat)
- Afsharid Empire (1736–1796)
- Emirate of Afghanistan (1823–1926)
- Emirate of Afghanistan (1929)
- Kingdom of Afghanistan (1926–1973)
- Islamic Emirate of Afghanistan (1996–2001)
- Barakzai dynasty (1826–1973)
- Hotaki dynasty (1709–1738)
- Durrani Empire (1747–1826)
- Azad Khan (1750–1758)
- Shiberghan Khanate (1757–1875)
- Sar-e Pol Khanate (1510–1875)
- Maymana Khanate (1506–1900)
- Khulm Khanate (1800–1849)
- Kunduz Khanate (1508–1888)
- Ghuriyan Khanate (1803–1816)
- Badakshan Khanate (1657–1773)
- Andkhoy Khanate (1730–1880)
- Ghazni (1879–1880)
- Peshawar (1747–1823)
- Qandahar (1704–1881)
- Herat (1695–1881)
- Kabul Kingdom (1747–1901)
- Islamic Emirate of Kunar (1991)
- Islamic Emirate of Badakhshan (1996)
- Islamic Revolutionary State of Afghanistan (1980)

== Indian subcontinent ==
Bangladesh

- Khalji dynasty (1204–1231)
- Balban dynasty (1287–1324)
- Bengal Sultanate (1352–1576) under:
  - Ilyas Shahi dynasty (1342–1415, 1437–1487)
  - Bani Ganesh (1418–1437)
  - Hussain Shahi dynasty (1493–1538)
  - Muhammad Shahi dynasty (1554–1564)
  - Karrani dynasty (1564–1576)
- Nawabs of Bengal (1717–1880)
- Prithimpassa Estate (1499–1950)
- Pratapgarh Kingdom (1489–1700)
- Taraf Kingdom (1200–1610)
- Baro-Bhuiyan (1576–1611)

Pakistan

- Ghaznavids (1000–1186)
- Ghurids (1175–1210)
- Gibarids or Sultanate of Swat (1190-1519)
- Delhi Sultanate (1206–1526)
- Mughal Empire (1526–1857)
- Durrani Empire (1747–1826)
- In Sindh
  - Sind (caliphal province) (711–861)
  - Habbari dynasty (854–1011)
  - Soomra dynasty (1026–1356)
  - Samma dynasty (1351–1524)
  - Arghun dynasty (1520–1591)
  - Tarkhan dynasty (1554–1591)
  - Kalhora dynasty (1701–1783)
  - Talpur dynasty (1783–1843)
  - Khairpur (princely state) (1783–1947)
- In Punjab
  - Emirate of Multan (855–1010)
  - Sayyid dynasty (1398-1414)
  - Langah Sultanate (1445–1540)
  - Bahawalpur (princely state) (1727–1947)
  - Pakpattan state (1692–1810)
  - Sial dynasty (1727-1816)
- In Kashmir (1339–1586)
  - Shah Mir dynasty (1339–1561)
  - Chak dynasty (1554–1586)
- Northern dynasties (780–1947)
  - Trakhan dynasty (780–1821)
  - Maqpon dynasty (1190–1840)
  - Hunza (princely state) (1700–1974)
  - Nagar (princely state) (1660–1974)
- Dynasties of Chitral
  - Raees Dynasty (1320–1570)
  - Katoor dynasty (1570–1947)
- In Khyber
  - Qarlughids (1238–1266)
  - Pakhal's Sultanate of Swat (1190-1519)
  - Pakhli Sarkar (1472–1703)
  - Emirate of Waziristan (2004–2014)
  - Swat (princely state) (1849–1972)
  - Amb (princely state) (1772–1971)
  - Phulra (princely state) (1828–1950)
  - Dir (princely state) (1626–1969)
  - Jandol State (1830–1972)
- In Balochistan
  - Las Bela (princely state) (1742–1955)
  - Ma'danid dynasty (10th-11th century)
  - Kharan (princely state) (1697–1955)
  - Makran (princely state) (1898–1955)
  - Khanate of Kalat (1666–1955)

India

- Mahaniyyah Kingdom (c. 9th century)
- Ghaznavids (1000–1030)
- Ghurids (1192–1206)
- Delhi Sultanate (1206–1526)
  - Mamluk dynasty of Delhi (1206–1290)
  - Khalji Dynasty (1290–1320)
  - Tughlaq dynasty (1321–1414)
  - Sayyid Dynasty (1414–1451)
  - Lodi dynasty (1451–1526)
- Bengal Sultanate (1352–1576)
- Khandesh Sultanate under Farooqi dynasty (1382–1601)
- Jaunpur Sultanate (1394–1479)
- Gujarat Sultanate (1394–1573)
- Malwa Sultanate (1392–1562)
- Kingdom of Kalpi (1410–1444)
- Sur Empire (1540–1556)
- Mughal Empire (1526–1857)
- Bahmani Sultanate (1347–1527)
- Madurai Sultanate (1335–1378)
- Mysore Kingdom (1749–1799) under Hyder Ali, Tippu Sultan
- Noohani dynasty (16th century)
- Deccan sultanates (1489–1687)
  - Bidar Sultanate (1492–1619)
  - Ahmadnagar Sultanate (1490–1637)
  - Berar Sultanate (1490–1572)
  - Bijapur Sultanate (1490–1686)
  - Golconda Sultanate (1518–1687)
- Nawab of Bengal and Murshidabad (1707–1880)
- Carnatic Sultanate (1692–1855)
- Oudh State (1732–1858)
- Balasinor State (1758–1948)
- Banda (state) (1790–1858)
- Nawab of Banganapalle (1665–1947)
- Baoni State (1784–1947)
- Basoda State (1753–1947)
- Bhopal State (1723–1947)
- Dujana (1806–1947)
- Nawab of Farrukhabad (1714–1802)
- Hyderabad State (1724–1949)
- Jafarabad State (1650–1948)
- Janjira State (1489–1948)
- Jaora State (1808–1948)
- Junagadh State (1730–1948)
- Kamadhia (1817–1947)
- Cambay State (1730–1948)
- Arakkal Kingdom (1545–1819)
- Nawab of Kurnool (1690–1839)
- Kurwai State (1713–1923)
- Loharu State (1806–1931)
- Malerkotla State (1468–1947)
- Bantva Manavadar (1733–1947)
- Mohammadgarh State (1818–1947)
- Palanpur State (1597–1947)
- Pataudi State (1804–1931)
- Pathari State (1794–1947)
- Radhanpur State (1753–1948)
- Nawab of Rajouri (1194–1846)
- Rampur State (1719–1947)
- Sachin State (1791–1947)
- Sardargarh Bantva (1743–1948)
- Savanur State (1680–1912)
- Nawab of Surat (1733–1842)
- Tonk State (1817–1947)
- Zainabad (1903–1947)
- Mewat (1372–1527)
- Kharagpur Raj (1615–1840)
- Qaimkhani (1384–1731)
- Kingdom of Rohilkhand (1710–1857)
- Nanpara (1632–1947)
- Nawab of Mamdot (1800–1947)
- Bhikampur and Datawali (Aligarh) State (1750–1947)
- Nawab of Farrukhnagar (1732–1947)
- Nawab of Chhatari (1680–1981)
- Nawab of Sardhana (1842–1947)
- Faujdars of Purnea (1704–1947)
- Nawab of Pahasu (1825–1969)

== Southern Europe ==
Spain & Portugal

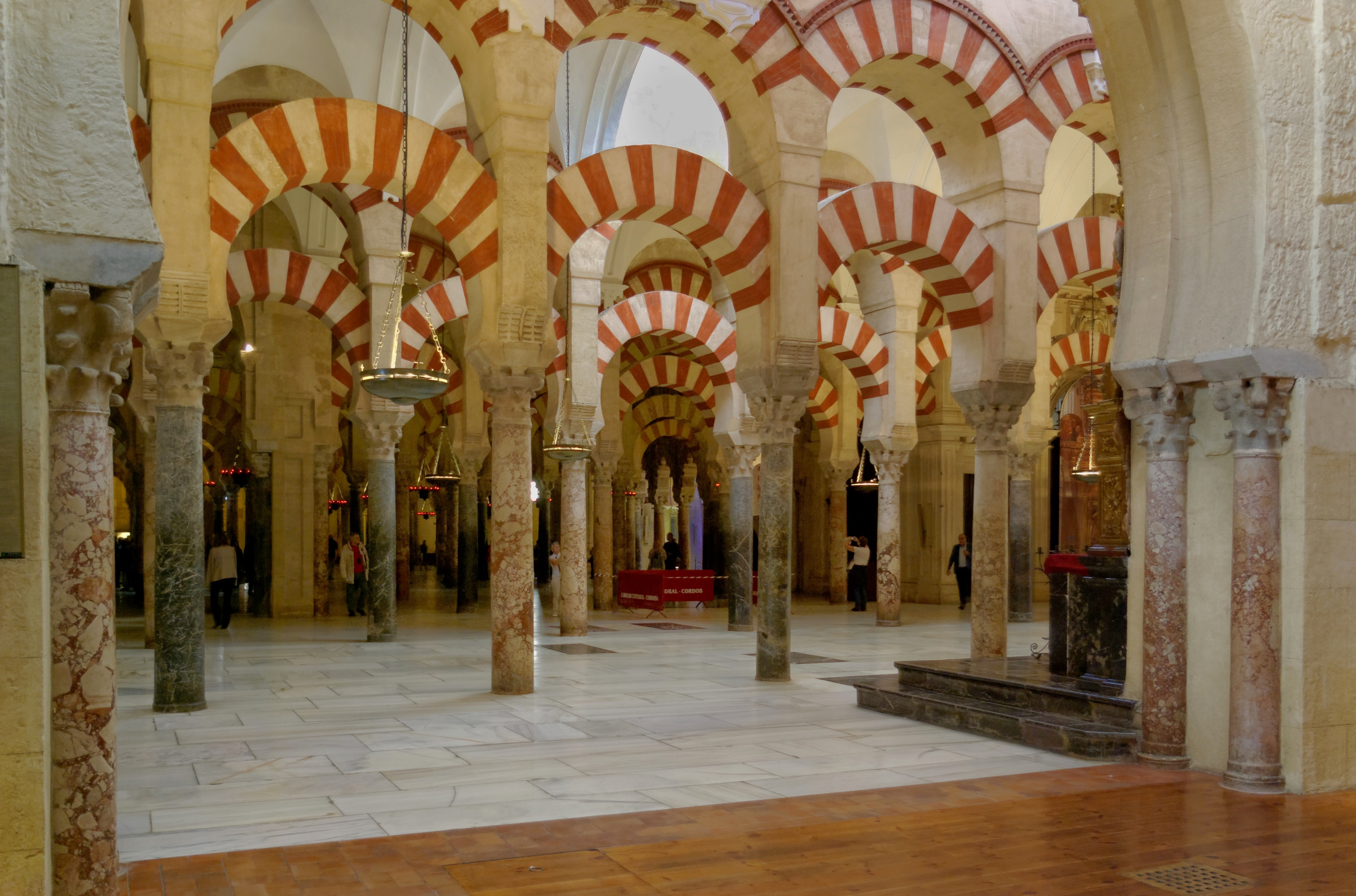
Mezquita

- Umayyad Emirate of Cordoba (756–929)
- Umayyad Caliph of Cordoba (929–1031)
- Taifa of Arjona (1232–1244)
- Taifa of Barcelona (716–801)
- Taifa of Baeza (1224–1226)
- Taifa of Ceuta (1026–1079)
- Taifa of Constantina and Hornachuelos (1143–1150)
- Taifa of Guadix and Baza (1145–1151)
- Taifa of Saltes and Huelva (1012–1051)
- Taifa of Jaen (1145–1168)
- Taifa of Lérida (1039–1046,1102–1110)
- Taifa of Murviedro and Sagunto (1086–1092)
- Taifa of Orihuela (1239–1249)
- Taifa of Purchena (1145–1150)
- Taifa of Segura (1147–1150)
- Taifa of Tortosa (1010–1099)
- Taifa of Tejada (1146–1150)
- Taifa of Valencia (1010–1238)
- Taifa of Alpuente (1009–1106)
- Taifa of Badajoz (1009–1151)
- Taifa of Morón (1010–1066)
- Taifa of Toledo (1010–1085)
- Taifa of Tortosa (1010–1099)
- Taifa of Arcos (1011–1145)
- Taifa of Almería (1010–1147)
- Taifa of Denia (1010–1227)
- Taifa of Valencia (1010–1238)
- Taifa of Murcia (1011–1266)
- Taifa of Albarracín (1012–1104)
- Taifa of Zaragoza (1013–1110)
- Taifa of Granada (1013–1145)
- Taifa of Carmona (1013–1150)
- Taifa of Santa María de Algarve (1018–1051)
- Taifa of Mallorca (1018–1203)
- Taifa of Lisbon (1022–1093)
- Taifa of Seville (1023–1091)
- Taifa of Niebla (1023–1262)
- Taifa of Córdoba (1031–1091)
- Taifa of Mértola (1033–1151)
- Taifa of Algeciras (1035–1058)
- Taifa of Ronda (1039–1065)
- Taifa of Silves (1040–1151)
- Taifa of Málaga (1073–1239)
- Taifa of Molina (c. 1080's–1100)
- Taifa of Lorca (1228–1250)
- Taifa of Menorca (1228–1287)
- Emirate of Granada (1228–1492)

France

- Fraxinetum (887–972)
- Emirate of Septimania, Southern France (Gaul) (719–759) Rule by:

Umayyad Caliph of Cordova

Italy

- Emirate of Bari (847–871)
- Emirate of Taranto (831–880)
- Emirate of Sicily (802–1091) Rule by:
  - Wali of Sicily (802–827) Euphemius & Asad
  - Aghlabids of Sicily (827–909)
  - Fatimids of Sicily (909–965)
  - Emirate of Sicily (965–1091) Kalbids

Gibraltar

- Gibraltar Maghreb (711–1462)

== Sahel and Subsaharan Africa ==
Sudan, South Sudan

- Banu Kanz (1004–1412, Nubian)
- Kingdom of al-Abwab (1276–1560)
- Darfur Sultanate (1445–1916)
- Dar Fertit (1700–1873)
- Dar al Masalit Sultanate (1884–1921)
- Dar Qimr Sultanate (1850–1945)
- Funj Sultanate (1503–1821)
- Kingdom of Fazughli (1685–1821, Under Sennar)
- Kordofan Sultanate (1700–1821)
- Khedivate of Egypt (1867–1914)
- Mahdiyya (1889–1898)
- Sultanate of Egypt (1914–1922)
- Kingdom of Egypt (1922–1958)

Mauritania

- Emirate of Brakna (1600–1934)
- Emirate of Trarza (1640–present)
- Emirate of Adrar (1740–1932)
- Emirate of Tagant (1580–present)

Niger

- Dendi Kingdom (1591–1901)
- Sultanate of Agadez (1449–1900)
- Sultanate of Damagaram (1731–present)
- Dosso kingdom (1750–present)
- Sultanate of Maradi (1807–present)
- Tera Kingdom (1700–present)
- Kokoro Kingdom (1700–1901)
- Goure Kingdom (1700–1960)
- Dargol Kingdom (1700–1901)
- Emirate of Say (1825–1860)

Nigeria

- Bornu Empire (1380–1893)
- Sokoto Caliphate (1804–1903)
- Hausa Kingdoms (1696–1831)
- Nupe Kingdom (1531–1872)
- Biu Kingdom (1535–1740)
- Gadawur Kingdom (1421–1807)
- Biram Kingdom (1110–1808)
- Kingdom of Ila Orangun (1680–present)
- Iwo Kingdom (1415–present)
- Kingdom of Kano (999–1349)
- Sultanate of Kano (1350–1805)
- Sultanate of Kebbi (1515–1831)
- Yauri Kingdom (1400–1799)
- Zamfara Kingdom (1200–1804)
- Zaria Kingdom (1200–1896)
- Osogbo Kingdom (1760–present)
- Ede Kingdom (1858–present)
- Suleja Emirate (1804–present)
- Adamawa Emirate (1809–present)
- Agaie Emirate (1832–present)
- Bade Emirate (1818–present)
- Bashar Emirate
- Bauchi Emirate (1805–present)
- Bida Emirate (1856–present)
- Biu Emirate (1740–present)
- Birnin Gwari
- Borgu Emirate (1730–present)
- Borno Emirate (1902–present)
- Damaturu Emirate (2004–present)
- Daura Emirate (1778–present)
- Dikwa Emirate (1901–present)
- Fika Emirate (1806–present)
- Gobir Kingdom (1694–1800)
- Gobir Emirate (1800–present)
- Gombe Emirate (1804–present)
- Gujba Emirate (2000–present)
- Gumel Emirate (1750–present)
- Gusau Emirate (1997–present)
- Gwandu Emirate (1849–present)
- Hadejia Emirate (1808–present)
- Ohinoyi of Ebiraland (1904–present)
- Ilorin Emirate (1824–present)
- Jajere Emirate (2000–present)
- Jama'are Emirate (1811–present)
- Jema'a Emirate (1810–present)
- Kano Emirate (1805–present)
- Katagum Emirate (1807–present)
- Katsina Emirate (1903–present)
- Kazaure Emirate (1819–present)
- Kebbi Emirate (1849–present)
- Keffi Emirate (1802–present)
- Kontagora Emirate (1858–present)
- Koton Karifi (1800–present)
- Lafia Emirate (1650–present)
- Lafiagi Emirate (1975–present)
- Lapai Emirate (1825–present)
- Lere Emirate (1808–present)
- Machina Emirate
- Misau Emirate (1850–present)
- Mubi Emirate (1805–present)
- Muri Emirate (1817–present)
- Nasarawa Emirate (1835–present)
- Ningi Emirate (1827–present)
- Pategi Emirate (1897–present)
- Potiskum Emirate (1809–present)
- Tula Chiefdom (2003–present)
- Rano Emirate (1819–present)
- Rano Kingdom (523–1819)
- Yauri Emirate (1799–present)
- Zamfara Emirate (1804–present)
- Zazzau Emirate (1808–present)
- Agbede (1880–present)
- Ajasse Ipo (1749–present)
- Ado-Odo Kingdom (1494–present)
- Auchi (1819–present)
- Kaiama Emirate (1770–present)
- Dutse Emirate (1807–present)
- Gwoza Emirate (1919–present)
- Ibadan (1820–present)
- Bichi Emirate (2019–present)
- Gaya Emirate (2019–present)
- Karaye Emirate (2019–present)
- Gwanara Emirate (1810–present)
- Shanga Emirate (1859–present)
- Wase Emirate (1820–present)
- Yashikira Emirate (1769–present)
- Bwari Emirate (1976–present)
- Daular Musulunci (2014–present)

Mali

- Songhai Empire (1430s–1591)
- Pashalik of Timbuktu (1591–1833)

Regional

- Fulani Empire of Sokoto (1804–1903)
- Fulani or Fulbe Empire of Macina of Seku Amadu (1818–1862)
- Fulani or Fulbe Empire of El Hajj Oumar Tall, Toucouleur Empire (1848–1898)
- Fulani or Fulbe Empire of Bundu (state) of Malick Daouda Sy (1669–1954)
- Kanem Empire (700–1380)
- Bornu Empire (1380–1893)
- Wadai Empire (1501–1912)

Cameroon

- Bafut Kingdom (1750–present)
- Kotoko Kingdom (1450–present)
- Bamum Kingdom (1394–present)
- Banyo Kingdom (1830–present)
- Bibemi Sultanate (1770–present)
- Garoua Sultanate (1810–present)
- Kontcha Kingdom (1902–present)
- Kungi Kingdom (1990–present)
- Logone-Birni Kingdom (1805–present)
- Mandara Kingdom (1500–present)
- Maroua Sultanate (1792–present)
- N'Gaoundere Sultanate (1836–present)
- Rey Bouba Sultanate (1804–present)
- Tibati Lamidate (1810–present)
- Bankim Kingdom (1760–present)
- Mboum Kingdom (1800–present)

Burkina Faso

- Yatenga Kingdom (1333–present)
- Tenkodogo Kingdom (1120–present)
- Bilanga Kingdom (1700–present)
- Koala Kingdom (1810–present)
- Nungu Kingdom (1204–present)
- Pama Kingdom (1600–present)
- Gurunsi Kingdom (1870–1897)
- Liptako Kingdom (1810–present)
- Gwiriko Kingdom (1714–1915)

Chad

- Kanem Empire (700–1380)
- Wadai Empire (1501–1912)
- Sultanate of Yao (1630–1909)
- Tunjur kingdom (1400–1650)
- Kingdom of Baguirmi (1485–1898)
- Dar Sila (1213–1643)
- Dar Runga (1700–1898)
- Rabih az-Zubayr (1860–1900)
- Kabka Sultanate (1990–Present)

Central African Republic

- Sultanate of Dar al Kuti (1830–1912)
- Sultanate of Rafaï (1800–1939)
- Sultanate of Zémio (1830–1923)
- Sultanate of Bangassou (1780–1917)

Côte d'Ivoire

- Kong Empire (1690–1913)
- Kabadougou Kingdom (1846–1880)
- Bouna Kingdom (1600–present)

Ghana

- Dagbon Kingdom (1409–present)
- Kingdom of Wala (1317–present)
- Mamprusi (1450–present)
- Nanumba (1850–present)
- Gonja kingdom (1564–present)
- Zabarima Emirate (1860–1897)

Senegal

- Imamate of Futa Toro (1776–1821)
- Imamate of Futa Jallon (1725–1911)
- Empire of Great Fulo (1490–1776)

Guinea

- Benna Kingdom (1858–1904)
- Bramaya Kingdom (1800–1883)
- Dubreka Kingdom (1800–1888)
- Fuuta Jalon (1726–1912)
- Kanea Kingdom (1800–1880)
- Kinsam Kingdom (1850–1894)
- Koba Kingdom (1700–1898)
- Landuma Kingdom (1700–1892)
- Nalu Kingdom (1845–1884)
- Samburu Kingdom (1700–1892)
- Solima Kingdom (1850–1894)
- Timbi Tunni Kingdom (1800–1890)

Togo

- Kotokolia (1785–present)
- Tchamba (1750–present)
- Bafilo (1700–present)
- Bassar (1800–present)
- Cokossi (1750–present)

Sierra Leone

- Alikalia Kingdom (1817–1898)
- Biriwa Chiefdom (1800–present)
- Dembelia Sikunia (1850–present)
- Imperri Chiefdom (1850–present)
- Kaiyamba Chiefdom (1884–present)
- Mande (1800–1919)
- Nongowa Chiefdom (1820–present)
- Safroko Limba Chiefdom (1907–present)
- Susu Kingdom (1806–1892)
- Kingdom of Koya (1505–1908)
- Ko Fransa Kingdom (1700–1859)
- Tonko Limba Chiefdom (1836–present)
- Wonkafong (1794–1890)

== East Africa (Swahili Coast) ==
Tanzania

- Pemba Sultanate (1550–1829)
- Hadimu Sultanate (1650–1873)
- Unyanyembe Kingdom (1727–present)
- Kilindi dynasty (1750–present)
- Tumbatu Sultanate (1800–1865)
- Sultanate of Ujiji (1800–present)
- Sultanate of Zanzibar (1856–1964)
- Uhehu Sultanate (1860–1962)

Kenya

- Malindi Kingdom (850–1861)
- Kilwa Sultanate (957–1517)
- Pate Sultanate (1203–1870)
- Mombasa Sultanate (1502–1895)
- Wituland (1858–1929)

Democratic Republic of the Congo

- Tippu Tip's State (1860–1887)
- Sultanate of Kasongo (1860–1895)

Malawi

- Jumbes of Nkhotakota (1840–1894)

Mozambique

- Angoche Sultanate (1485–1910)
- City-State of Inhambane (1000–1894)
- Sofala Sultanate (1100–?)
- Sangage Sultanate (1600–1913)
- Kitangonya Sultanate (1750–1906)
- Sancul Sultanate (1753–1910)

== Indian Ocean Region ==
Maldives

- Sultanate of Maldives (1153–1968)
  - Theemuge dynasty (1161–1338)
  - Hilaalee dynasty (1388–1558)
  - Utheemu dynasty (1632–1692)
  - Hamavi dynasty (1692)
  - Devadhu dynasty (1692–1701)
  - Isdhoo dynasty (1701–1704)
  - Dhiyamigili dynasty (1704–1759, 1766–1773)
  - Huraa dynasty (1759–1766, 1774–1968)

Mayotte

- Sultanate of Mwati (1500–1841)

Comoros

- Sultanate of Ndzuwani (1711–1912)
- Sultanate of Ngazidjia (1400–1912) also known as the Sultanate of Bambao
- Sultanate of Mwali (1830–1909)
- Sultanate of Bajini (1500–1889)
- Sultanate of Itsandra (1400–1886)
- Sultanate of Mitsamihuli
- Sultanate of Washili
- Sultanate of Hambuu
- Sultanate of Hamahame
- Sultanate of Mbwankuu
- Sultanate of Mbude
- Sultanate of Domba

Madagascar

- Sakalava Kingdom (1500–1898)
- Antemoro Kingdom (1495–1888)

== Eastern Europe (Balkan Region) ==
Ukraine, Moldova

- Crimean Khanate (1441–1783)
- Budjak Horde (1603–1799)

Romania, Bulgaria

- Tamrash Republic (1878–1886)
- Provisional Government of Western Thrace (1913)

Greece

- Pashalik of Yanina (1788–1822)
- Emirate of Crete (820–961)

Albania, Bosnia

- Pashalik of Scutari (1757–1831)
- Pashalik of Berat (1774–1809)
- Autonomous Province of Western Bosnia (1995)

== Ural Region, Siberia (Russia) ==
- Volga Bulgaria (922–1236)
- Golden Horde (1251–1502)
- Kazan Khanate (1438–1552)
- Astrakhan Khanate (1466–1556)
- Qasim Khanate (1452–1681)
- Bashkirs (800–1557)
- Sibir Khanate (1468–1598)
- Great Horde (1466–1502)
- Nogai Horde (1440–1634)
- Lesser Nogai Horde (1449–1783)
- Crimean Khanate (1441–1783)
- Mukhsha Ulus (1300–1500)
- Idel-Ural State (1918)

== Central Asia, East Asia ==
Transoxania (Uzbekistan, Kyrgyzstan, Tajikistan, Turkmenistan, Kazakhstan)

- Afrighid dynasty (305–995)
- Principality of Ushrusana (822–892)
- Karakhanid Empire (840–1212, Transoxiana)
- Oghuz Yabgu State (1003–1055)
- Seljuk Empire (1029–1194, based in Merv, Eastern Division)
- Khwarazmian Empire (1077–1231)
- Timurid dynasty (1370–1507)
- Chagatai Khanate (Mongol) (1226–1347)
- Muhtajids (950–1030)
- Yarkent Khanate (1487–1705)
- Shaybanid (1428–1599)
- Samanid Empire (819–999)
- Ghaznavids (977–1186)
- Khanate of Bukhara (1500–1785)
- Kazakh Khanate (1456–1847)
- Khanate of Khiva (1511–1920)
- Khanate of Kokand (1709–1876)
- Uzbek Khanate (1428–1471)
- White Horde (Mongol) (1360–1428)
- Emirate of Bukhara (1785–1920)
- Golden Horde (Mongol) (1313–1502)
- Bukey Horde (1801–1845)
- Sufids (1361–1379)
- Ögedei Khanete (1226-1402)

Mongolia and China

- Kara-Khanid Khanate (840–1212)
- Moghulistan (Mongol) (1347–1462)
  - Western Moghulistan (1462–1690)
  - Eastern Moghulistan / Uyghurstan (1462–1680)
- Yarkent Khanate (1514–1705)
- Turpan Khanate (1487–1570)
- Kashgaria Khanate (1865–1877)
- Kumul Khanate (1696–1930)
- Khoja Kingdom (1693–1857)
- Dughlats (1466–1514)
- Kingdom of Mangalai (1220–1877)
- Pingnan Guo (1856–1873)
- First East Turkestan Republic (1933–1934)
- Second East Turkestan Republic (1944–1949)

== Southeast Asia ==
Brunei, Indonesia, Malaysia, Singapore, Australia

- Samudera Pasai Sultanate (1267–1521)
- Malacca Sultanate (1400–1511)
- Bruneian Sultanate (1363–present)
- Aceh Sultanate (1496–1904)
- Demak Sultanate (1475–1554)
- Cirebon Sultanate (1430–1666)
- Banten Sultanate (1527–1813)
- Sultanate of Siak (1723–1949)
- Gorontalo Sultanate (1385–1878)
- Aru Kingdom (1225–1613)
- Salawati Kingdom (1500s–1935)
- Sultanate of Langkat (1568–1946)
- Sultanate of Asahan (1630–1946)
- Sultanate of Serdang (1723–1946)
- Sultanate of Deli (1632–1946)
- Pagaruyung Kingdom (1347–1833)
- Sultanate of Johor (1528–present)
- Sultanate of Kedah (1136–present)
- Sultanate of Kelantan (1267–present)
- Sultanate of Perak (1528–present)
- Bilah Sultanate (1630–1946)
- Sultanate of Pahang (1470–present)
- Sultanate of Selangor (1743–present)
- Sultanate of Terengganu (1725–present)
- Perlis Kingdom (1843–present)
- Negeri Sembilan Kingdom (1773–present)
- Sultanate of Sarawak (1599–1641)
- Bima Sultanate (1620–1958)
- Mataram Sultanate (1586–1755)
- Kingdom of Pajang (1568–1618)
- Yogyakarta Sultanate (1755–present)
- Surakarta Sunanate (1745–present)
- Kingdom of Sumedang Larang (1527–1620)
- Kalinyamat Sultanate (1527–1599)
- Sultanate of Ternate (1257–1914)
- Sultanate of Tidore (1450–1967)
- Sultanate of Jailolo (1200s–1832)
- Sultanate of Bacan (1322–1965)
- Sultanate of Banjar (1526–1860)
- Sultanate of Pontianak (1771–1950)
- Kutai Kartanegara Sultanate (1600s–1945)
- Sultanate of Sambas (1609–1956)
- Sultanate of Sintang (1365–1950)
- Sultanate of Bulungan (1731–1964)
- Kingdom of Bolaang Mongondow (1670–1950)
- Sultanate of Gowa (1300s–1945)
- Kingdom of Tallo (1400–1856)
- Palembang Sultanate (1659–1823)
- Kingdom of Kaimana (1309–1923)
- Jambi Sultanate (1550–1905)
- Riau-Lingga Sultanate (1824–1911)

Philippines

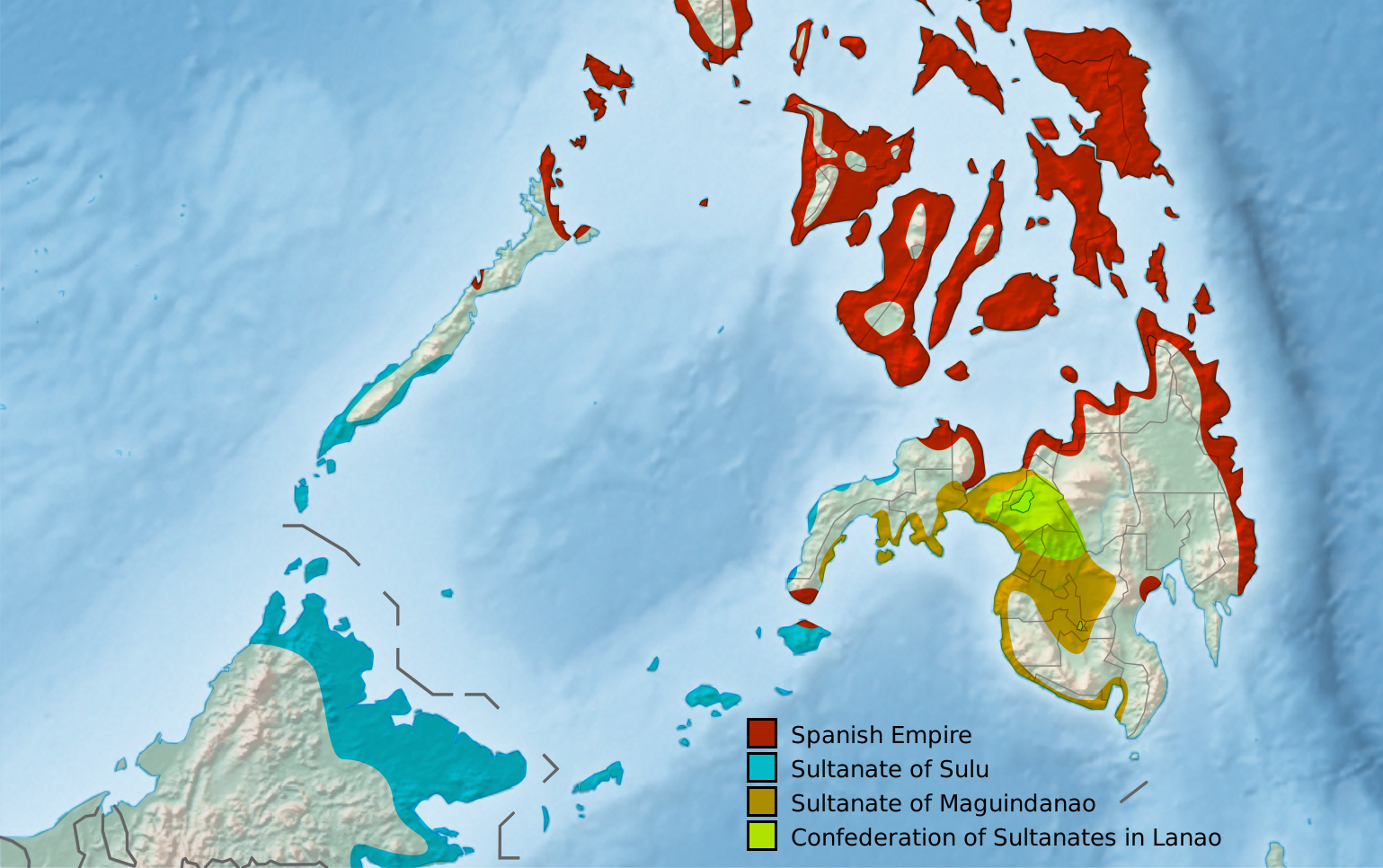
Approximate extent of the Muslim Sultanates in the Philippines

- Kingdom of Manila (1258–1571)
- Datu of Mactan (1500–1540) ?
- Sultanate of Buayan (1350–1905)
- Sultanate of Maguindanao (1515–1905)
- Sultanate of Panay (2011–present)
- Sultanate of Sulu (1405–1915, 1962–1986)
- Sultanates of Lanao (1616–1904)

Thailand

- Pattani Kingdom (1457–1902)
- Sultanate of Singora (1605–1680)
- Kingdom of Setul Mambang Segara (1808–1916)
- Kingdom of Reman (1810–1902)

Cambodia, Vietnam

- Kingdom of Champa (11th century–1832)
- Kingdom of Cambodia (1642–1658; during Sultan Ibrahim reign)

== See also ==
- List of Sunni dynasties
- List of Shia dynasties
- Islamic state
- Caliphate
- List of largest empires
- Timeline of Middle Eastern history
- Early Muslim conquests
- History of Islam
- Muslim world
- List of Buddhist Kingdoms and Empires
- List of Hindu empires and dynasties
- List of Jain states and dynasties
- List of Jewish states and dynasties
- List of Zoroastrian states and dynasties
- List of Confucian states and dynasties
- List of Tengrist states and dynasties
- List of Tajik dynasties and states

== Bibliography ==
Anjum, Tanvir (2007). "The Emergence of Muslim Rule in India: Some Historical Disconnects and Missing Links". Islamic Studies. 46 (2): 217–240. ISSN 0578-8072.
