= Lists of dynasties =

Lists of dynasties include:

- List of dynasties, sorted by geographic region

== By ethnicity ==
- Jewish
- Kurdish
- Maratha
- Mongol
- Pashtun
- Tamil

== By caste ==
- Brahmin
- Jat
- Rajput

== By region/state ==
- Arabia
- China
- Egypt
- Ireland
- Mesopotamia
- Roman Empire
- United Arab Emirates
- Vietnam

== By religion ==
- Buddhist
- Confucian
- Hasidic
- Hindu
- Islamic
  - Iran
  - Shia
  - Sunni
- Jain
- Tengrist
- Zoroastrian

== Other ==
- List of noble houses
