= Battle of Gabès =

- Part of Hafsid-Arab conflict
Date	1387
Location	Gabès,Tunisia
Result	Hafsid Victory

Belligerents
Hafsid dynasty	Banu Makki

Commanders and leaders
Abu al-Abbas Ahmad II	Abd-el-Ouahab Ibn Mekki (surrendered)

Strength
Unknown	Unknown

Casualties and losses
Unknown	destruction of the areas surrounding the city

The Battle of Gabès took place in 1387 and was fought between the rebel forces of the Banu Makki, a tribe based mainly in southern Tunisia and in the Tunisian Sahel, and the Hafsid forces led by Sultan Abu al-Abbas Ahmad II. The battle ended with the capitulation of the rebel leader Abd-el-Ouahab and the destruction of the city’s olive trees.

== Background ==
The Banu Makki began their rebellion in 1347 by conquering the city of Sousse from the Banu Misikin family, under the control of a ruler named Abu al-Abbas. They then continued their revolt by conquering Mahdia and Djerba. In 1350, they established their authority over Sfax and even Tripoli. In 1380, the Banu Makki took control of the Djerid region by capturing Gafsa, Tozeur, and Nefta. They thus established an emirate that stretched along the entire eastern coast of Tunisia as far as northern Libya.

== Battle ==
In 1387, Sultan Abu Al-Abbas Ahmad II took up arms against the ruler of the Banu Makki, Abd-el-Ouahab ibn Mekki, due to his refusal to pay the tax imposed by the Sultan. He marched against the capital of the Banu Makki, Gabès. As punishment, the Sultan ordered the cutting down of all the trees, the destruction of the oasis, and the devastation of the areas surrounding the city before conquering it.

== Aftermath ==
After conquering Gabès, the Sultan gave the city to one of his sons. He did the same in the Djerid before leaving to suppress another revolt farther west, in what is now Kabylie.

== Sources ==
- Abu-Nasir, Jamil (1987). A history of the Maghrib in the islamic Period. Cambridge university Press.
- Goguyer, Antoine (1895). Supériorité du chemin de fer de Gafsa à Gabés sur celui de Gafsa à Sfax (in French).
- Mercier, Ernest (1888). Histoire de l’Afrique septentrionale depuis les temps les plus reculés jusqu’à la conquête française (in French).
