= List of Taoist states and dynasties =

This is a list of historical states and dynasties that had Taoism (also known as Daoism) as their state ideology or where it exerted both significant political and cultural influence. Taoism is a Chinese religion and philosophy founded by Laozi during the Spring and Autumn period between the 8th and 3rd centuries BC

== List of Taoist states and dynasties ==
- Zhanghan (191–220 AD), Theocratic state controlling the Hanzhong valley controlled by the Celestial Masters of the Way of the Five Pecks of Rice (142–215)
- Yellow Turbans (184–205)
- Cao Wei (220–266)
- Tang dynasty (618–907)
- Song dynasty (960–1279)
- Yuan dynasty (1271–1368)

== See also ==
- Taoism
- History of Taoism
- List of Confucian states and dynasties
- List of Buddhist kingdoms and empires
