= Ardakhshir II =

1st century BC king of Persis

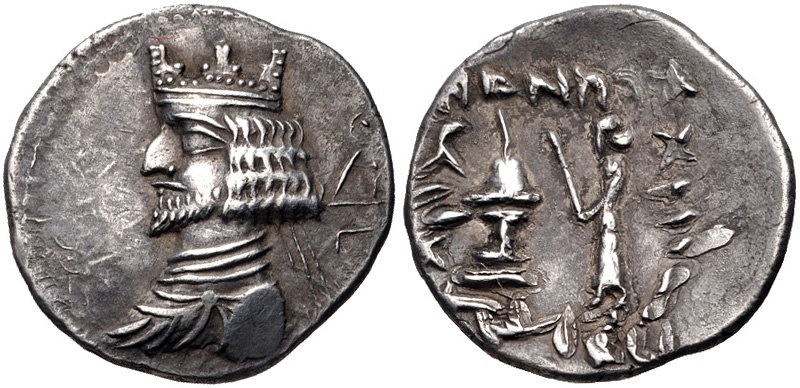
- Silver drachma of Ardakhshir II.

King of Persis
- Reign: c. 1st century BC
- Predecessor: Darayan II
- Successor: Wahshir
- Father: Darayan II
- Religion: Zoroastrianism

Ardakhshir II (also spelled Artaxerxes II) was king of Persis in the 1st century BC, a vassal state of the Parthian Empire. An inscription written in Middle Persian on a silver cup bears his name. He was succeeded by Wahsir.

== Sources ==
- Curtis, Vesta Sarkhosh (2007), "The Iranian Revival in the Parthian Period", in Curtis, Vesta Sarkhosh and Sarah Stewart (ed.), The Age of the Parthians: The Ideas of Iran, vol. 2, London & New York: I.B. Tauris & Co Ltd., in association with the London Middle East Institute at SOAS and the British Museum, pp. 7–25, ISBN 978-1-84511-406-0.
- Shayegan, M. Rahim (2011). Arsacids and Sasanians: Political Ideology in Post-Hellenistic and Late Antique Persia. Cambridge University Press. pp. 1–539. ISBN 9780521766418.
- Sellwood, David (1983), "Minor States in Southern Iran", in Yarshater, Ehsan (ed.), Cambridge History of Iran, vol. 3, London: Cambridge UP, pp. 299–322, ISBN 9780521200929
- Wiesehöfer, Josef (2000). "Frataraka". Encyclopaedia Iranica, Vol. X, Fasc. 2. p. 195.
- Wiesehöfer, Josef (2009). "Persis, Kings of". Encyclopaedia Iranica.

Ardakhshir II
Preceded by Darayan II	King of Persis; 1st century BC	Succeeded by Wahshir
