= Wadfradad III =

Early 1st century BC king of Persis

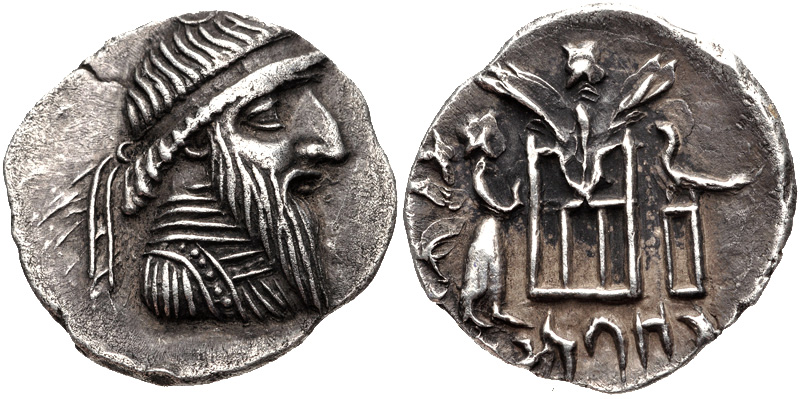
- Coin of Wadfradad III, Persepolis mint.

King of Persis
- Reign: 1st half of the 1st century BC
- Predecessor: Darayan I
- Successor: Darayan II
- Died: 1st half of the 1st century BC
- Issue: Darayan II
- Religion: Zoroastrianism

Wadfradad III, Hellenized as Autophradates III, was the second king of Persis, ruling sometime in the 1st half of the 1st century BC. He was the successor of Darayan I, and was succeeded by his son Darayan II.

== Sources ==
- Curtis, Vesta Sarkhosh (2007), "The Iranian Revival in the Parthian Period", in Curtis, Vesta Sarkhosh and Sarah Stewart (ed.), The Age of the Parthians: The Ideas of Iran, vol. 2, London & New York: I.B. Tauris & Co Ltd., in association with the London Middle East Institute at SOAS and the British Museum, pp. 7–25, ISBN 978-1-84511-406-0.
- Potts, Daniel T., ed. (2017). The Oxford Handbook of Ancient Iran. Oxford University Press. pp. 1–1021. ISBN 9780190668662.
- Shayegan, M. Rahim (2011). Arsacids and Sasanians: Political Ideology in Post-Hellenistic and Late Antique Persia. Cambridge University Press. pp. 1–539. ISBN 9780521766418.
- Sellwood, David (1983), "Minor States in Southern Iran", in Yarshater, Ehsan (ed.), Cambridge History of Iran, vol. 3, London: Cambridge UP, pp. 299–322, ISBN 9780521200929
- Wiesehöfer, Josef (2000). "Frataraka". Encyclopaedia Iranica, Vol. X, Fasc. 2. p. 195.
- Wiesehöfer, Josef (2009). "Persis, Kings of". Encyclopaedia Iranica.

Wadfradad III
Preceded by Darayan I	King of Persis; 1st half of the 1st century BC	Succeeded by Darayan II
