= Pakor II =

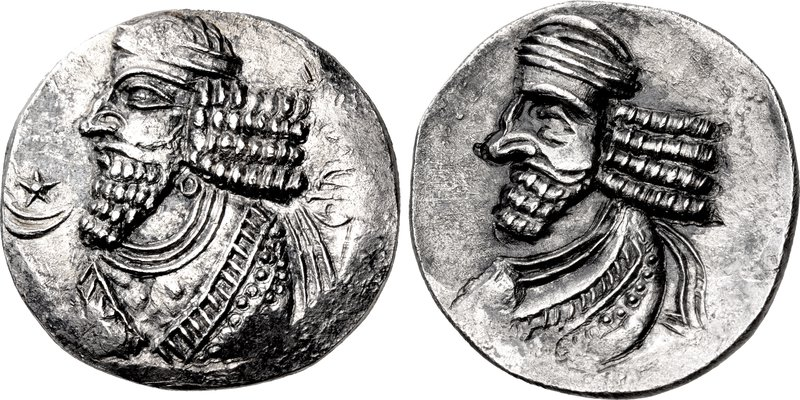
A coin of Pakor II

Pakor II (or Pakur II, Greek: Pakoros) was the king of Persis under Parthian suzerainty in the first half of the first century AD. He was the son of Wahshir and successor of Pakor I. He was the first Persid ruler to put his name on the obverse of his coins, some of which show a three-pointed star on the reverse, the meaning of which is unclear.

== Bibliography ==
- Rezakhani, Khodadad (2013). "Arsacid, Elymaean, and Persid Coinage". In Potts, Daniel T. (ed.). The Oxford Handbook of Ancient Iran. Oxford University Press. ISBN 978-0199733309.
- Wiesehöfer, Josef (2009). "Persis, Kings of". Encyclopaedia Iranica.

Pakor II
Preceded by Pakor I	King of Persis; First half of the 1st century AD	Succeeded by Nambad
