= Darayan II =

1st century BC king of Persis

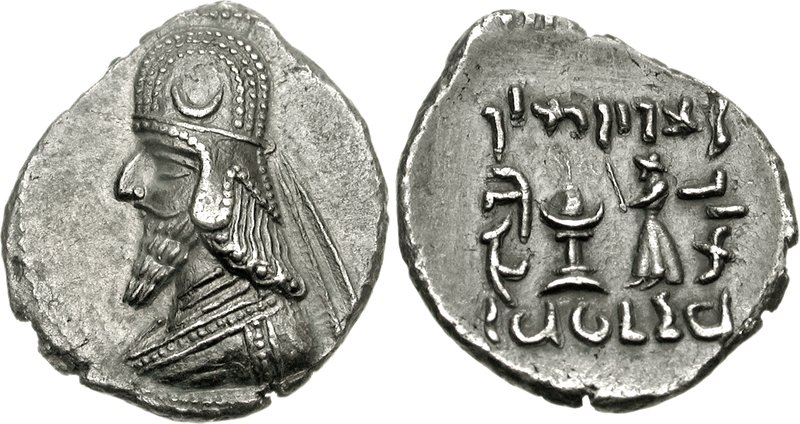
- Silver drachma of Darayan II.

King of Persis
- Reign: c. 1st century BC
- Predecessor: Wadfradad III
- Successor: Ardakhshir II
- Issue: Ardakhshir II
- Father: Wadfradad III
- Religion: Zoroastrianism

Darayan II (also called Darius II; Aramaic: 𐡃𐡀𐡓𐡉𐡅 𐡌𐡋𐡊𐡀 dʼryw mlkʼ) was king of Persis in the 1st century BC, a vassal state of the Parthian Empire. He was succeeded by his son Ardakhshir II.

In the silver drachmas of Darayan II, on the obverse, the king is wearing a tiara with a crescent and star symbol, earflap, and decorated with precious stones. On the reverse, the king is facing a fire altar & holding a scepter, with an inscription in Aramaic dʼryw MLKʼ BRḤ wtprdt ("Darius the King, son of Wadfradad the King").

== Sources ==
- Curtis, Vesta Sarkhosh (2007), "The Iranian Revival in the Parthian Period", in Curtis, Vesta Sarkhosh and Sarah Stewart (ed.), The Age of the Parthians: The Ideas of Iran, vol. 2, London & New York: I.B. Tauris & Co Ltd., in association with the London Middle East Institute at SOAS and the British Museum, pp. 7–25, ISBN 978-1-84511-406-0.
- Shayegan, M. Rahim (2011). Arsacids and Sasanians: Political Ideology in Post-Hellenistic and Late Antique Persia. Cambridge University Press. pp. 1–539. ISBN 9780521766418.
- Sellwood, David (1983), "Minor States in Southern Iran", in Yarshater, Ehsan (ed.), Cambridge History of Iran, vol. 3, London: Cambridge UP, pp. 299–322, ISBN 9780521200929
- Wiesehöfer, Josef (2000). "Frataraka". Encyclopaedia Iranica, Vol. X, Fasc. 2. p. 195.
- Wiesehöfer, Josef (2009). "Persis, Kings of". Encyclopaedia Iranica.

Darayan II
Preceded by Wadfradad III	King of Persis; 1st century BC	Succeeded by Ardakhshir II
