= Purchena =

- Municipality
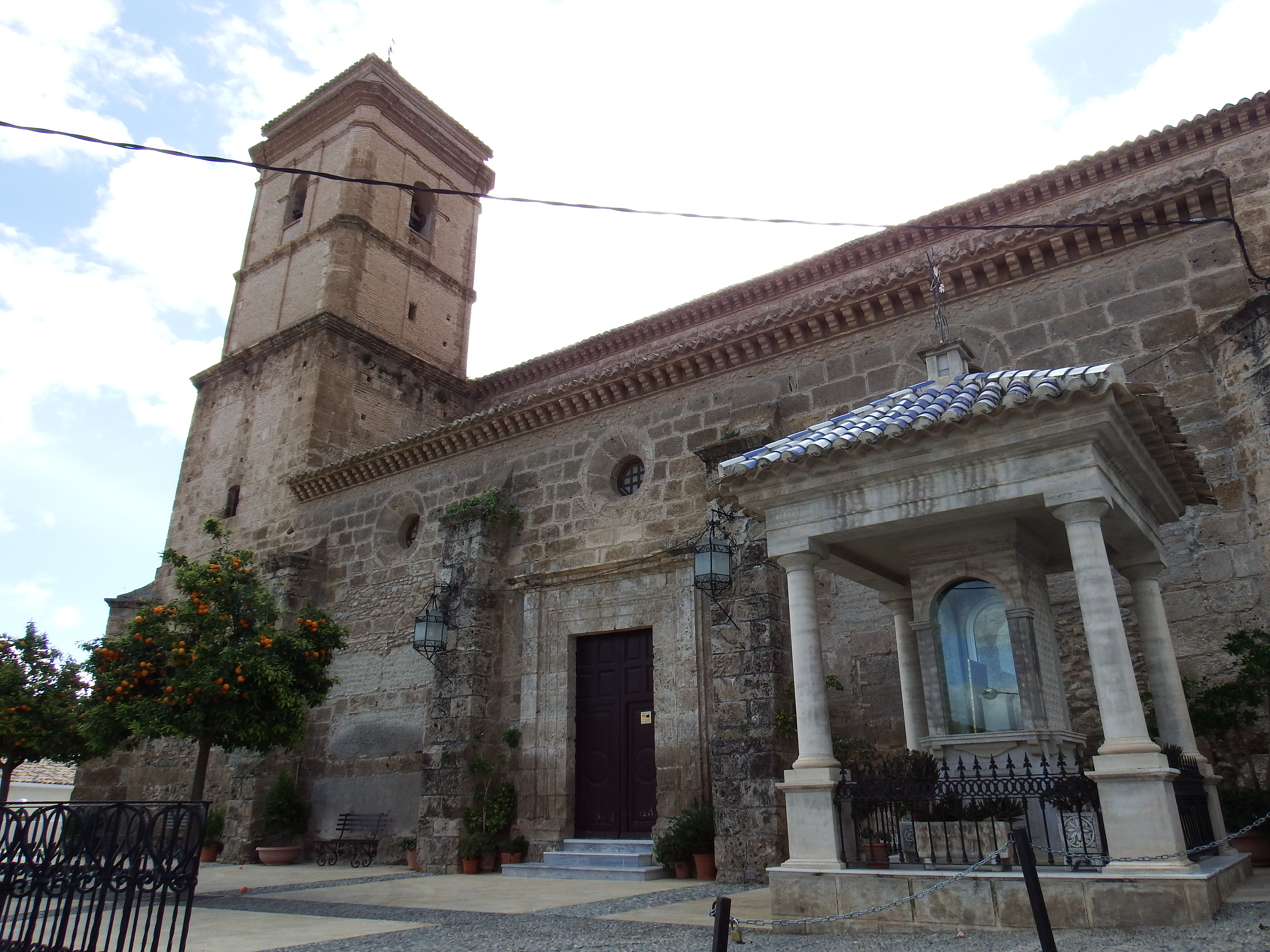

- Flag Coat of arms

- Location of Purchena in Spain
- Coordinates: 37°21′N 2°21′W
- Country: Spain
- Autonomous Community: Andalusia
- Municipality: Almería
- Comarca: Almanzora

Government
  - Mayor: Juan Miguel Tortosa Conchillo (PSOE)

Area
  - Total: 57 km^{2} (22 sq mi)
- Elevation: 555 m (1,821 ft)

Population (2025-01-01)
  - Total: 1,563
  - Density: 27/km^{2} (71/sq mi)
- Time zone: UTC+1 (CET)
  - Summer (DST): UTC+2 (CEST)

Purchena is a small town in Almería, southern Spain. It is situated at the foot of the Sierra de los Filabres, in the middle of the Almanzora River Valley, surrounded by woods which ascend towards the mountains, an environment which contrasts with the rest of the municipalities of the area which are set in much more arid surroundings.

== History ==
Purchena has been populated since the Bronze Age. It was also inhabited during the Roman period, but it was during the Arab conquest when it was most important. In the 10th century it was founded with the name Hisn Burxana, and during the reign of Al-Ahmar I in the 13th century it was known as Val de Porchena, and it was converted into the head of the Almanzora, which formed a part of the Kingdom of Nazari of Granada. In the year 1489 the town became part of the Catholic Monarchs' empire with Baza, Guadix and Almería.

The current town took shape during the 18th and 19th centuries around the Constitution and Larga Squares.

== Moorish Games of Aben Humeya ==
The Moorish Games are a historical event that Aben Humeya, King of the Moorish people, first celebrated in Purchena in 1569.

During the Games, several cultural events, sporting activities and other activities are celebrated, such as: performances of historical events (staged by young people from Purchena in the same style as it was 400 years ago), ancient Andalusian music, Arabian cooking, traditional dances and sports such as Moorish-Style wrestling, Middle League Race, hop, step and jump, and archery.

All of these competitions admit the participation of athletes from all over the world who compete to win the prize and the laurel crown. Aben Humeya Moorish Games have been declared of National Tourist Interest by the Council of Tourism and Sport of the Andalusian Government.

== See also ==
- Taifa of Purchena
- List of municipalities in Almería

== Bibliography ==
- Pérez de Hita, Ginés: La guerra de los moriscos: (segunda parte de las guerras civiles de Granada). Universidad de Granada, 1998. ISBN 84-338-2445-7.
- Acosta Montoro, José: Aben Humeya. Rey de los moriscos (Prólogo de Juan Goytisolo). Instituto de Estudios Almerienses y Ayuntamiento de Purchena: Almería, 1998. ISBN 84-8108-161-2
- Acosta Montoro, José: Hisn Burxana. Apuntes para una historia del Castillo de Purchena. Ayuntamiento de Purchena: Almería, 1998.
- Sola, Manolo; Grima, Juan: Guía Cultural y Turística de Purchena. Ayuntamiento de Purchena: Granada, 1.993.
- Sola, Manolo: Guía para no perderse por las tradiciones de Purchena. Asoc. Cultural Gremio Luna, Ayuntamiento de Purchena: Almería, 2.001. D.L. AL-148-2002.
