= Darayan I =

2nd century BC king of Persis

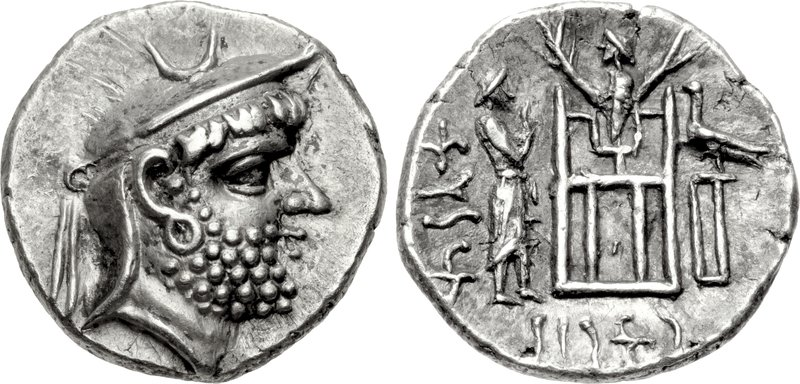
- Coin of Darayan I, Persepolis mint. Reverse: Aramaic legend: 𐡃𐡀𐡓𐡉𐡅 𐡌𐡋𐡊𐡀 dʼryw MLKʼ "Darius the King".

King of Persis
- Reign: after 132 BC
- Predecessor: Wadfradad II
- Successor: Wadfradad III
- Died: after 132 BC
- Religion: Zoroastrianism

Darayan I (also spelled Darew I, Darev I and Darius I; Aramaic: 𐡃𐡀𐡓𐡉𐡅 dʼryw was the first king of Persis, most likely invested with kingship of the region by his overlord, the Parthian monarch Phraates II (r. 132–127 BC) sometime after 132 BC.

Although Darayan I's name was usually read as "Darew" by numismatics, an engraving of his name on a silver bowl has led to his name being read as "Darayan" by most recent studies. The name is derived from Old Persian daraya-vahauš, the name of the prominent Achaemenid King of Kings Darius the Great (r. 522–486 BC). (Note: The Parthian variant of the name is Dārāw, whilst the New Persian version is Dārā(b).) Darayan I, unlike his predecessors—the fratarakas—used the title of shah ("king"), and laid foundations to a new dynasty, which may be labelled the Darayanids. The title for "king" he uses on his coinage is malik, whilst the legend on the reverse is dʼryw MLKʼ ("Darius the King"). The reason behind his adoption of the title of Darayan was seemingly because he felt strong enough to do so, and in spite of the difficulties that he and his successors faced, they did not renounce the title until the fall of the kingdom.

The style of the silver drachmas under Darayan I was a continual of the one under the fratarakas. On the obverse, the king is wearing a soft cap (bashlyk) with a crescent. On the reverse, the king is facing a fire temple with the Zoroastrian supreme deity Ahura Mazda above, and holding a scepter, and on the other side of the temple an eagle mounted on a pedestal. The reverse has an inscription in the Aramaic script: 𐡃𐡀𐡓𐡉𐡅 𐡌𐡋𐡊𐡀 dʼryw MLKʼ ("Darius the King"). Parthian influence was notable on the coinage of Darayan I and his successors. Darayan I was succeeded by Wadfradad III.

== Sources ==
- Curtis, Vesta Sarkhosh (2007), "The Iranian Revival in the Parthian Period", in Curtis, Vesta Sarkhosh and Sarah Stewart (ed.), The Age of the Parthians: The Ideas of Iran, vol. 2, London & New York: I.B. Tauris & Co Ltd., in association with the London Middle East Institute at SOAS and the British Museum, pp. 7–25, ISBN 978-1-84511-406-0.
- Rezakhani, Khodadad (2017). "Arsacid, Elymaean, and Persid coinage". In Potts, Daniel T. (ed.). The Oxford Handbook of Ancient Iran. Oxford University Press. pp. 766–778. ISBN 9780190668662.
- Rezakhani, Khodadad (2020). "Onomastica Persida: Names of the Rulers of Persis in the Seleucid and Arsacid Periods". Ancient Iranian Numismatics. pp. 129–135. ISBN 978-1949743166.
- Shayegan, M. Rahim (2011). Arsacids and Sasanians: Political Ideology in Post-Hellenistic and Late Antique Persia. Cambridge University Press. pp. 1–539. ISBN 9780521766418.
- Sellwood, David (1983). "Minor States in Southern Iran". In Yarshater, Ehsan (ed.). The Cambridge History of Iran: The Seleucid, Parthian and Sasanian Periods. Vol. 3(1). Cambridge: Cambridge University Press. pp. 299–322. ISBN 0-521-20092-X.
- Wiesehöfer, Josef (2000). "Frataraka". Encyclopaedia Iranica, Vol. X, Fasc. 2. p. 195.
- Wiesehöfer, Josef (2009). "Persis, Kings of". Encyclopaedia Iranica.

Darayan I
Preceded by Wadfradad II	King of Persis after 132 BC	Succeeded by Wadfradad III
