= Banu Thabit =

Dynasty in 14th-century Tripoli, Libya

Flag of Tripoli circa 1350, according to the Book of Knowledge of All Kingdoms

The Banu Thabit or Banu 'Ammar were a Berber dynasty that ruled Tripoli in present-day Libya during the 14th century. Their rule began with Thabit ibn 'Ammar, who took control of the city from the Hafsids of Tunis. His successors ruled nominally on behalf of the Hafsids but were mostly autonomous. Their rule was interrupted by the Genoese capture of Tripoli in 1354–1355, but they were able to retake the city in 1369–1370. Their rule definitely ended with the Hafsid reconquest of the city in 1401.

== History ==
After the collapse of Almohad rule in the Maghreb during the early 13th century, Tripoli came under the authority of the Hafsids of Tunis. Thabit ibn 'Ammar, a member of the Zakūğa tribe from the Huwwara tribal confederation, (Note: Historian Amar S. Baadj states that they were a local Arab family of Banu Sulaym origin.) took power in the city toward 1324. According to historian Jamil Abun-Nasr, he took power following a rebellion in the city that expelled the Hafsid prince, Ibn Abi 'Umran, whom the Hafsid caliph Abu Yahya Abu Bakr II had appointed there as governor. According to historian Dominique Valérian, Thabit came to power with the assassination of Sa'id ibn Ṭahir al-Mazughi, the city's previous ruler. Thabit was murdered six months later by Sa'id's son, Ahmad, before the latter was assassinated in turn by the Banu Thabit family, in revenge for Thabit's murder.

Thabit's son, Muhammad, was then given command of the city by the local population in 1326–1327. He governed the city nominally on behalf of the Hafsids, but ruled with a degree of independence that meant the city was effectively independent of Tunis. The commercial prosperity of Tripoli along with Hafsid weakness at this time, made this autonomy possible.

Muhammad was assassinated toward 1348 and succeeded by his son, Thabit. His rule was interrupted by the conquest of Tripoli by the Genoese in 1354–1355. Thabit and his brother fled and tried to take refuge with the Awlād Margham, an Arab tribe, but the latter killed them instead. In the same year, the Genoese agreed to give the city to the Banu Makki, the rulers of Gabès, in exchange for a large payment. The surviving members of the Banu Thabit family fled to Alexandria, Egypt, were they became successful merchants. With the funds they raised in Alexandria, they chartered Christian ships to return to Tripoli and gained support among the Arab tribes of the region, allowing them to retake the city in 1369–1370. Abu Bakr, the brother of the murdered Thabit and the new leader of the family, ruled the city on behalf of the Hafsids afterward.

Abu Bakr died in 1389–1390 and was succeeded by his nephew, Ali. Ali became embroiled in a rivalry with the leader of his army, Qasim ibn Khalafallah, who turned to the Hafsid sultan in Tunis for help. The Hafsid army attacked Tripoli in 1392–1393, with some support from Arab tribes in the area, but they were unable to capture the city as it was being supplied by sea. It's possible that the defenders were also assisted by the King of Sicily, Martin I. The subsequent Hasid ruler, Abu Faris Abd al-Aziz II, succeeded in arresting Ali in 1397–1398 and replaced him with two of Ali's nephews, Yahya and 'Abd al-Wahid. He returned and finally captured the city in 1401, ending the rule of the Banu Thabit and returning Tripoli to direct Hafsid control.
