= Pakor I =

1st-century CE king of Persis

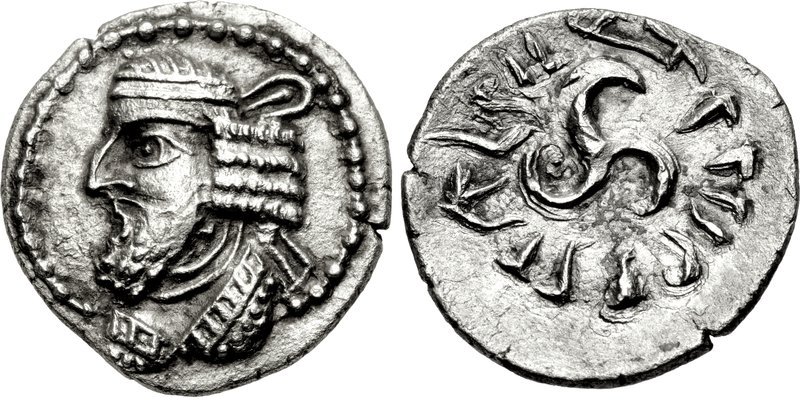
- Silver coin of Pakor I

King of Persis
- Reign: c. 1st century CE
- Predecessor: Wahshir
- Successor: Pakor II
- Religion: Zoroastrianism

Pakor I (also spelled Pakoros I) was king of Persis in the first half of the 1st century CE, a vassal state of the Parthian Empire. He is known to have adopted on his coins the same hairstyle used on the coins of the Parthian king Phraates III (r. 69–57 BC).

== Sources ==
- Curtis, Vesta Sarkhosh (2007), "The Iranian Revival in the Parthian Period", in Curtis, Vesta Sarkhosh and Sarah Stewart (ed.), The Age of the Parthians: The Ideas of Iran, vol. 2, London & New York: I.B. Tauris & Co Ltd., in association with the London Middle East Institute at SOAS and the British Museum, pp. 7–25, ISBN 978-1-84511-406-0.
- Rezakhani, Khodadad (2013). "Arsacid, Elymaean, and Persid Coinage". In Potts, Daniel T. (ed.). The Oxford Handbook of Ancient Iran. Oxford University Press. ISBN 978-0199733309.
- Shayegan, M. Rahim (2011). Arsacids and Sasanians: Political Ideology in Post-Hellenistic and Late Antique Persia. Cambridge University Press. pp. 1–539. ISBN 9780521766418.
- Sellwood, David (1983), "Minor States in Southern Iran", in Yarshater, Ehsan (ed.), Cambridge History of Iran, vol. 3, London: Cambridge UP, pp. 299–322
- Wiesehöfer, Josef (2000). "Frataraka". Encyclopaedia Iranica, Vol. X, Fasc. 2. p. 195.
- Wiesehöfer, Josef (2009). "Persis, Kings of". Encyclopaedia Iranica.

Pakor I
Preceded by Wahsir	King of Persis; First half of the 1st century CE	Succeeded by Pakor II
