= Kings of Persis =

Persian kings who were vassals to the Parthians until they formed the Sasanian Empire

- after 132 BC–AD 224
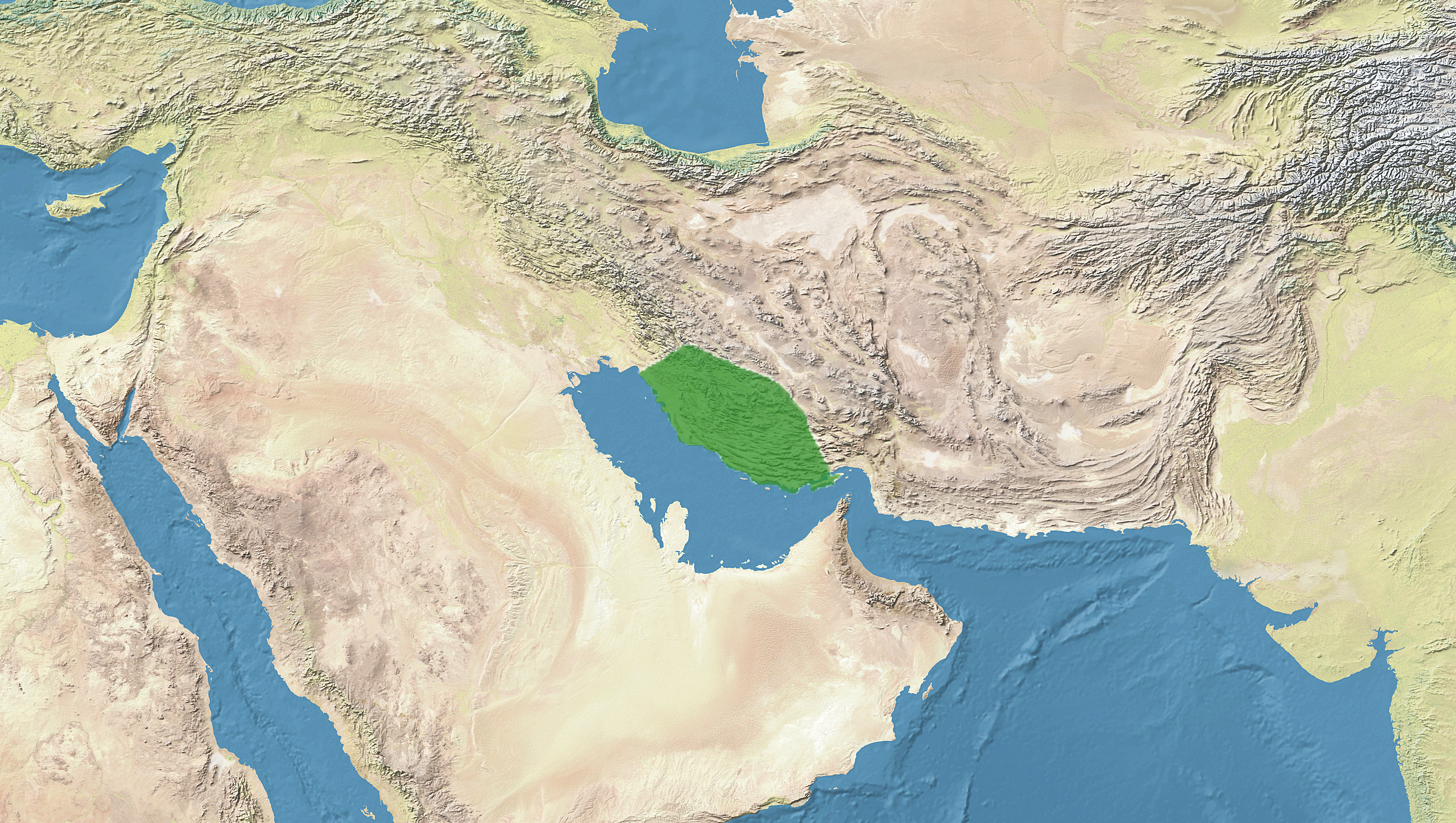
- Approximate extent of the kingdom
- Status: Vassal of the Parthian Empire
- Capital: Istakhr
- Common languages: Middle Persian
- Religion: Zoroastrianism
- Government: Monarchy
- King
  - after 132 BCE – ?: Darayan I (first)
  - 211/2–224: Ardakhshir V (last)
- Historical era: Late antiquity
  - Established: after 132 BC
  - Incorporated into the Sasanian Empire: AD 224
- Currency: Drachm
Preceded by	Succeeded by
Frataraka	Pars (Sasanian province)
- Today part of: Iran

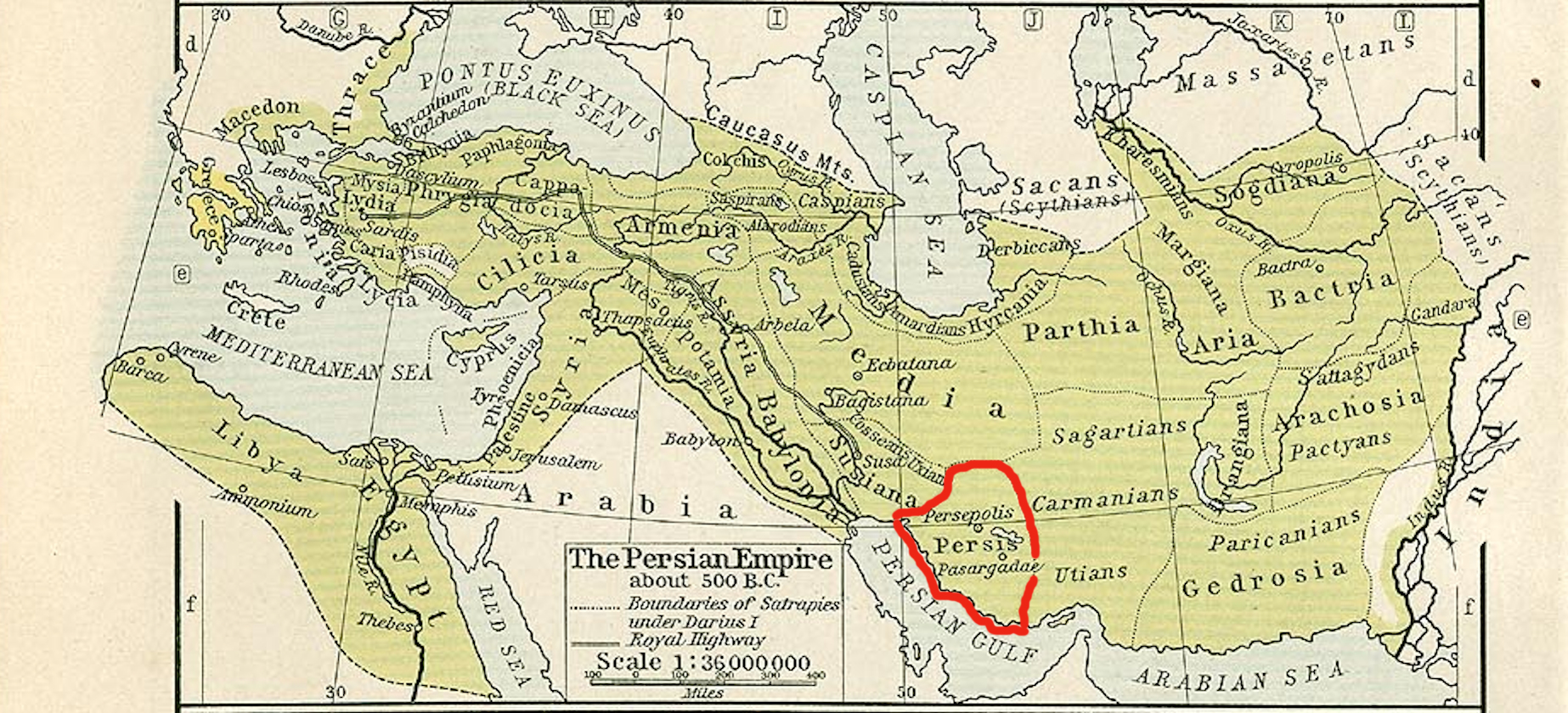
Location of Persis.

The Kings of Persis, also known as the Darayanids, were a series of Persian kings who ruled the region of Persis in southwestern Iran, from the 2nd century BC to 224 AD. They ruled as vassal kings of the Parthian Empire, until they toppled them and established the Sasanian Empire. They effectively formed some Persian dynastic continuity between the Achaemenid Empire (6th century BC – 4th century BC) and the Sasanian Empire (3rd century – 7th century AD ).

== History ==
Persis (also known as Pars), a region in the southwestern Iranian plateau, was the homeland of a southwestern branch of the Iranian peoples, the Persians. It was also the birthplace of the first Iranian Empire, the Achaemenids. The region served as the center of the empire until its conquest by the Macedonian king Alexander the Great (r. 336–323 BC). Since the end of the 3rd or the beginning of the 2nd century BC, Persis was ruled by local dynasts subject to the Hellenistic Seleucid Empire. These dynasts held the ancient Persian title of frataraka ("leader, governor, forerunner"), which is also attested in the Achaemenid-era. Later the frataraka Wadfradad II (fl. 138 BC) was made a vassal of the Iranian Parthian (Arsacid) Empire. The frataraka were shortly afterwards replaced by the Kings of Persis, most likely at the accession of the Arsacid monarch Phraates II (r. 132–127 BC). Unlike the fratarakas, the Kings of Persis used the title of shah ("king"), and laid foundations to a new dynasty, which may be labelled the Darayanids.

=== Sub-kings of the Parthian Empire ===
According to Strabo, the early kings of Persis were tributaries to the Seleucid rulers, until c.140 BC, when the Parthians conquered the region:

The Persians have kings who are subject to other kings, formerly of the kings of Macedonia, but now to the kings of the Parthians.

— Strabo XV 3.24

The Parthian Empire then took control of Persis under Arsacid king Mithridates I (ca. 171–138 BC), but visibly allowed local rulers to remain, and permitted the emission of coinage bearing the title of Mlk ("King"). From then on, the coinage of the Kings of Persis would become quite Parthian in character and style.

Under the Parthians, these dynasts were called kings and their title appeared on their coins: for example "dʾryw MLKʾ BRH wtprdt MLKʾ" (Dārāyān the King, son of Wādfradād the King). The Arsacid influence is very clear in the coinage, and Strabo also reports (15. 3.3) that during the time of Augustus (27 BC–14 CE), the kings of the Persians were as subservient to the Parthians as they had been earlier to the Macedonians:

But afterwards different princes occupied different palaces; some, as was natural, less sumptuous, after the power of Persis had been reduced first by the Macedonians, and secondly still more by the Parthians. For although the Persians have still a kingly government, and a king of their own, yet their power is very much diminished, and they are subject to the king of Parthia.

— Strabo, XV.3.3

=== Establishment of the Sasanian Empire ===
Under Vologases V (r. 191–208), the Parthian Empire was in decline, due to wars with the Romans, civil wars and regional revolts. The Roman emperor Septimius Severus (r. 193–211) invaded Parthian domains in 196, and two years later did it again, this time sacking the Parthian capital of Ctesiphon. At the same time, revolts occurred in Media and Persis.

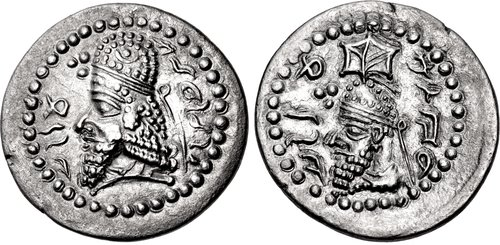
Coin minted under Pabag's son Shapur. The obverse shows a portrait of the latter, whilst the reverse shows a portrait of Pabag.

The Iranologist Touraj Daryaee argues that the reign of Vologases V was "the turning point in Parthian history, in that the dynasty lost much of its prestige." The kings of Persis were now unable to depend on their weakened Parthian overlords. Indeed, in 205/6, a local Persian ruler named Pabag rebelled and overthrew the Bazrangid ruler of Persis, Gochihr, taking Istakhr for himself. According to the medieval Iranian historian al-Tabari (d. 923), it was at the urging of his son Ardashir that Pabag rebelled. However, Daryaee considers this statement unlikely, and states that it was in reality Shapur that helped Pabag to capture Istakhr, as demonstrated by the latter's coinage which has portraits of both them.

There he appointed his eldest son Shapur as his heir. This was much to the dislike of Ardashir, who had become the commander of Darabgerd after the death of Tiri. Ardashir in an act of defiance, left for Ardashir-Khwarrah, where he fortified himself, preparing to attack his brother Shapur after Pabag's death. (Note: Physical evidence demonstrates that it was not from Darabgerd, as stated by al-Tabari, that Ardashir started expanding his domains, but from Ardashir-Khwarrah.) Pabag died a natural death sometime between 207 and 210 and was succeeded by Shapur, who became king of Persis. After his death, both Ardashir and Shapur started minted coins with the title of "king" and the portrait of Pabag. The obverse of Shapur's coins had the inscription "(His) Majesty, king Shapur" and the reverse had "son of (His) Majesty, king Pabag". Shapur's reign, however, proved short; he died under obscure conditions in 211/2. Ardashir thus succeeded Shapur as Ardashir V, and went on to conquer the rest of Iran, establishing the Sasanian Empire in 224 as Ardashir I.

== Coinage ==
The coinage of the Kings of Persis consists in individualized portraits of the rulers on the obverse, and often the rulers shown in a devotional role on the reverse. The style of the coins is often influenced by Parthian coinage, particularly in respect to the dress and the headgear of the rulers. A reverse legend in Aramaic, using the Aramaic script, gives the name of the ruler and his title (𐡌𐡋𐡊𐡀 MLKʼ: King), and often his relationship to a preceding ruler. The coin legends are written from right to left, wrapping the central scene in a counterclock-wise manner:

Coin legend of Darayan II
Legend, written from right to left, counterclock-wise: 𐡃𐡀𐡓𐡉𐡅 𐡌𐡋𐡊𐡀 𐡁𐡓𐡄 𐡅𐡕𐡐𐡓𐡃𐡕 𐡌𐡋𐡊𐡀 ← → dʼryw MLKʼ BRḤ wtprdt MLKʼ "Dārāyān the King, son of Wādfradād the King"

== List of the Kings of Persis, as Sub-Kings of the Parthian Empire ==
The Kings of Persis were preceded by the Fratarakas. The list of the King of Persis is mainly known though the coin sequence, and only a few kings are mentioned in ancient literary sources.

Name		Date	Coinage	Family Relations	Note
Sub-kings of the Parthian Empire
1	Dārāyān I (dʼryw)	2nd century BC (end)		?	Darayan I and his successors were sub-kings of the Parthian Empire. Crescent emblem on top of stylized kyrbasia. Coin legend: dʼryw MLKʼ (𐡃𐡀𐡓𐡉𐡅 𐡌𐡋𐡊𐡀, "Darius the king").
2	Wādfradād III (wtprdt)	1st century BC (1st half)		?	Legend: wtprdt MLKʼ (𐡅𐡕𐡐𐡓𐡃𐡕 𐡌𐡋𐡊𐡀).
3	Dārāyān II (dʼryw)	1st century BC		son of Wādfradād III	Legend: dʼryw MLKʼ BRḤ wtprdt (𐡃𐡀𐡓𐡉𐡅 𐡌𐡋𐡊𐡀 𐡁𐡓𐡄 𐡅𐡕𐡐𐡓𐡃𐡕, BRḤ="his son"), which is earliest definitive introduction of heterographic writing.
4	Ardašīr II (ʼrthštr)	1st century BC (2nd half)		son of Dārāyān II	Killed by his brother Vahshir I. Legend(?): ʼrtḥštr MLKʼ BRḤ dʼryw MLKʼ.
5	Wahšīr (wḥwḥštr)	1st century BC (2nd half)		son of Dārāyān II (?)	Legend(?): wḥwḥštr MLKʼ BRḤ dʼryw MLKʼ.
6	Pakur I	1st century CE (1st half)		?	
7	Pakur II	1st century CE (1st half)		son of Wahšīr I	
8	Nambed	1st century CE (mid)		son of an Ardašir	
9	Napād	1st century CE (2nd half)		son of Nambed	
10	'Unknown king II'	1st century CE (end)		?	
11	Wādfradād IV	2nd century CE (1st half)		?	
12	Mančihr I	2nd century CE (1st half)		?	
13	Ardašir III	2nd century CE (1st half)			
14	Mančihr II	2nd century CE (mid)			Obverse legend: ↖ mnctyw m[lka] (cf. Inscriptional Pahlavi 𐭬𐭭𐭰𐭲𐭩𐭥 𐭬𐭫𐭪𐭠) Reverse: ↖ mnctyw mlk[a] (cf. 𐭬𐭭𐭰𐭲𐭩𐭥 𐭬𐭫𐭪𐭠).
15	Uncertain King III/ tentatively Pakor III	2nd century CE (2nd half)		?	
16	Mančihr III	2nd century CE (2nd half)		son of Mančihr II (?)	Obverse: [mn]ctry mlka (cf. 𐭬𐭭𐭰𐭲𐭥𐭩 𐭬𐭫𐭪𐭠) Reverse (partially blundered): brh mnctry mlka (cf. 𐭡𐭥𐭧 𐭬𐭭𐭰𐭲𐭥𐭩 𐭬𐭫𐭪𐭠).
17	Ardašir IV	2nd century CE (end)		son of Mančihr III	
18	Vahshir II (Oxathres)	c. 206-210 CE		?	The last of Bazarangids.
Independent
19	Shapur	3rd century CE (beg.)		Brother of the first Sasanian, Ardashir I	
20	Ardashir V (Sasanian Dynasty Ardashir I)	3rd century CE (beg.)		First Sasanian ruler, under the name of Ardashir I	

== See also ==
- List of rulers of Parthian sub-kingdoms

== Sources ==
- Daryaee, Touraj (2014). Sasanian Persia: The Rise and Fall of an Empire. I.B.Tauris. pp. 1–240. ISBN 978-0857716668.
- Daryaee, Touraj (2012). "The Sasanian Empire (224–651)". In Daryaee, Touraj (ed.). The Oxford Handbook of Iranian History. Oxford University Press. ISBN 978-0199732159.
- Daryaee, Touraj (2010). "Ardashir and the Sasanians' Rise to Power". Anabasis: Studia Classica et Orientalia. 1. University of California: 236–255.
- Curtis, Vesta Sarkhosh; Stewart, Sarah (2008). The Sasanian Era. I.B.Tauris. pp. 1–200. ISBN 9780857719720.
- Curtis, Vesta Sarkhosh (2007), "The Iranian Revival in the Parthian Period", in Curtis, Vesta Sarkhosh and Sarah Stewart (ed.), The Age of the Parthians: The Ideas of Iran, vol. 2, London & New York: I.B. Tauris & Co Ltd., in association with the London Middle East Institute at SOAS and the British Museum, pp. 7–25, ISBN 978-1-84511-406-0.
- Frye, R. N. (1988). "Bābak (1)". Encyclopaedia Iranica, Vol. III, Fasc. 3. pp. 298–299.
- Potts, Daniel T., ed. (2017). The Oxford Handbook of Ancient Iran. Oxford University Press. pp. 1–1021. ISBN 9780190668662.
- Shayegan, M. Rahim (2011). Arsacids and Sasanians: Political Ideology in Post-Hellenistic and Late Antique Persia. Cambridge University Press. ISBN 9780521766418.
- Sellwood, David (1983), "Minor States in Southern Iran", in Yarshater, Ehsan (ed.), Cambridge History of Iran, vol. 3, London: Cambridge UP, pp. 299–322, ISBN 9780521200929
- Wiesehöfer, Josef (2000b). "Frataraka". Encyclopaedia Iranica, Vol. X, Fasc. 2. p. 195.
- Wiesehöfer, Joseph (2000a). "Fārs ii. History in the Pre-Islamic Period". Encyclopaedia Iranica.
- Wiesehöfer, Joseph (1986). "Ardašīr I i. History". Encyclopaedia Iranica, Vol. II, Fasc. 4. pp. 371–376.
- Wiesehöfer, Josef (2009). "Persis, Kings of". Encyclopaedia Iranica.
