= List of Confucian states and dynasties =

This is a list of historical and contemporary states and dynasties where Confucianism (including its various sects) was/is the state ideology or exerted/exerts significant politico-cultural influence. Its status could have been shared with other ideologies and/or religions such as Taoism, Buddhism or the Chinese folk religion at some point in time.

Confucianism developed during the Spring and Autumn period of Chinese history from the teachings of the Chinese philosopher Confucius. Confucianism was first adopted as state ideology by the Emperor Wu of Han upon the advice of the statesman Gongsun Hong. Confucianism was later promulgated throughout the Sinosphere.

== List of historical Confucian regimes ==
Note that the dates stated are the corresponding dates for the states/dynasties, not the dates reflecting the adoption of Confucianism as state religion or its widespread influence. Entries are sorted alphabetically.

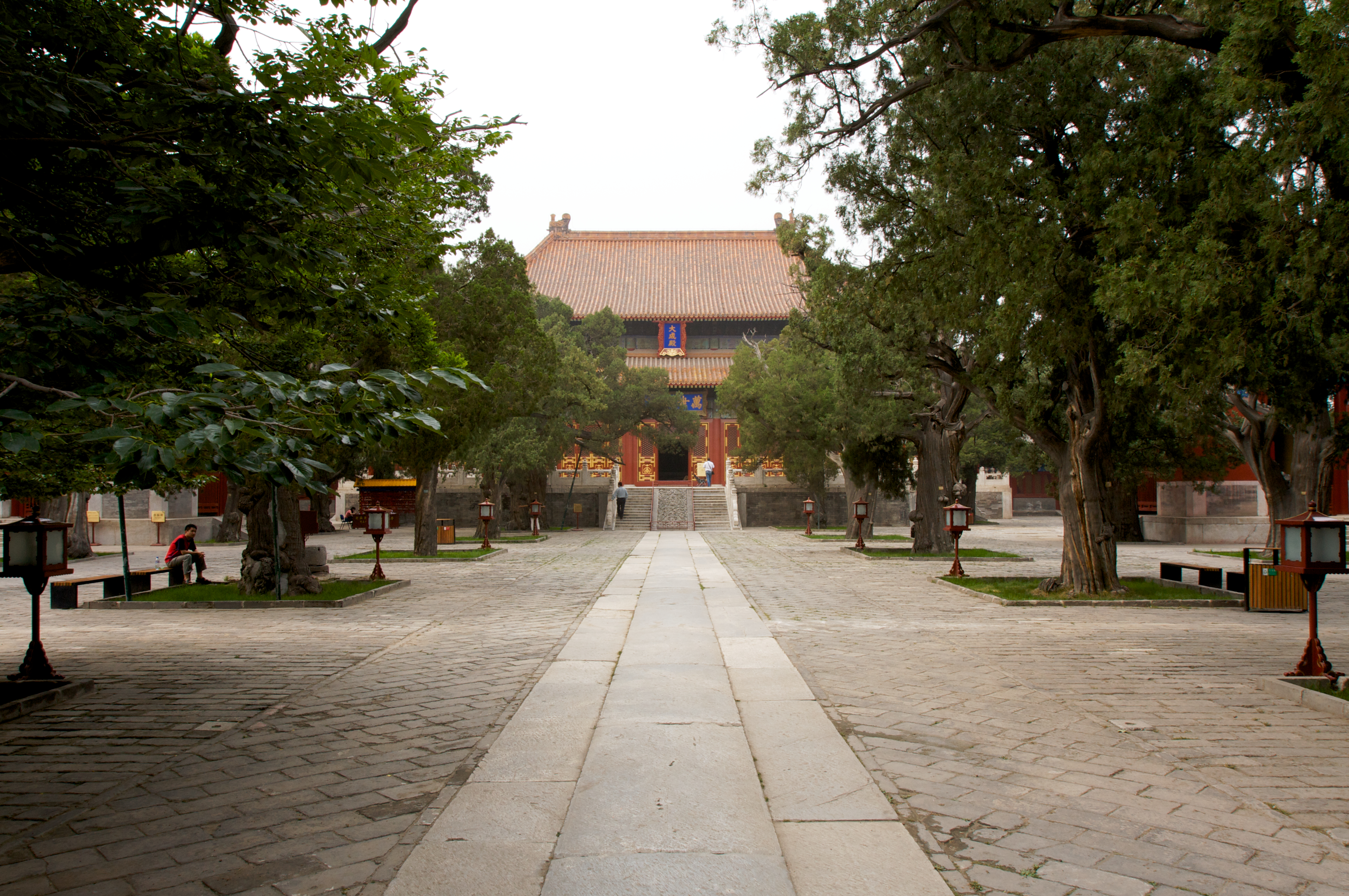
The Temple of Confucius in Beijing was the site of formal ceremonies hosted by imperial officials of the Yuan, Ming and Qing dynasties of China to pay respect to Confucius.

- Asuka Japan (AD 538–710)
- Azuchi–Momoyama Japan (AD 1568–1600)
- Baekje (18 BC–AD 660)
- Balhae (AD 698–926)
- Cao Wei (AD 220–266)
- Chen dynasty (AD 557–589)
- Đinh dynasty (AD 968–980)
- Eastern Han (Han dynasty) (AD 25–220)
- Eastern Jin (Jin dynasty) (AD 317–420)
- Early Lê dynasty (AD 980–1009)
- Early Lý dynasty (AD 544–602)
- Eastern Wu (AD 222–280)
- Eastern Zhou (Zhou dynasty) (770–256 BC)
- Heian Japan (AD 794–1185)
- Hồ dynasty (AD 1400–1407)
- Jin dynasty (AD 1115–1234)
- Joseon dynasty (AD 1392–1897)
- Kamakura Japan (AD 1185–1333)
- Korean Empire (AD 1897–1910)
- Later Baekje (AD 892–936)
- Later Han (AD 947–951)
- Later Jin (AD 936–947)
- Later Jin (AD 1616–1636)
- Later Trần dynasty (1407–1413)
- Later Zhou (AD 951–960)
- Liang dynasty (AD 502–557)
- Liao dynasty (AD 916–1125)
- Liu Song (AD 420–479)
- Lý dynasty (AD 1009–1225)
- Mạc dynasty (AD 1527–1677)
- Ming dynasty (AD 1368–1644)
- Muromachi Japan (AD 1336–1573)
- Nara Japan (AD 710–794)
- Ngô dynasty (AD 939–965)
- Nguyễn dynasty (AD 1802–1945)
- Nguyễn lords (AD 1558–1777)
- Northern Han (AD 951–979)
- Northern Qi (AD 550–577)
- Northern Song (Song dynasty) (AD 960–1127)
- North Vietnam (AD 1945–1976)
- Northern Wei (AD 386–535)
- Northern Yuan (AD 1368–1635)
- Northern Zhou (AD 557–581)
- Primitive Lê dynasty (Later Lê dynasty) (AD 1428–1527)
- Qing dynasty (AD 1636–1912)
- Revival Lê dynasty (Later Lê dynasty) (AD 1533–1789)
- Ryukyu Kingdom (AD 1429–1879)
- Shu Han (AD 221–263)
- Silla (57 BC–AD 935)
- Southern Ming (AD 1644–1662)
- Southern Qi (AD 479–502)
- Southern Song (Song dynasty) (AD 1127–1279)
- South Vietnam (AD 1955–1975)
- Sui dynasty (AD 581–619)
- Taebong (AD 901–918)
- Tang dynasty (AD 618–690, AD 705–907)
- Tây Sơn dynasty (AD 1778–1802)
- Tokugawa shogunate (AD 1790–1868)
- Trần dynasty (AD 1225–1400)
- Trịnh lords (AD 1545–1787)
- Western Han (Han dynasty) (202 BC–AD 9)
- Western Jin (Jin dynasty) (AD 266–316)
- Western Liao (AD 1124–1218)
- Western Xia (AD 1038–1227)
- Wu Zhou (AD 690–705)
- Xin dynasty (AD 9–23)
- Yuan dynasty (AD 1271–1368)

== List of contemporary states with Confucian influence ==
Entries are sorted alphabetically.

- China, People's Republic of
- China, Republic of
- Japan
- Korea, Democratic People's Republic of
- Korea, Republic of
- Mongolia
- Republic of Singapore
- Socialist Republic of Vietnam

== See also ==
- Chinese culture
- Chinese influence on Korean culture
- Chinese influence on Japanese culture
- Confucianism
- Confucius
- Current Texts Confucianism
- Duke Yansheng
- Dynasties of China
- Korean Confucianism
- Edo neo-Confucianism
- List of Buddhist kingdoms and empires
- List of Taoist states and dynasties
- Little China (ideology)
- Neo-Confucianism
- New Confucianism
- Sinosphere
- Taigu school
- Vietnam under Chinese rule
