= Kotokolia =

Kotokolia is a chiefdom in Togo which began in the 18th century. The ruler's title is Uro Eso and the monarchy is now Muslim. The first ruler was Uro Eso Agoro Dam, and the current ruler is Uro Eso A. Komah.

List of rulers

- Uro Eso Ca Jobo I ?–1860
- Uro Eso Ca Jobo II (or Bukari "Malua") 1860–1870
- Uro Eso Ca Jobo III 1870–1888?
- Uro Eso Yusuf ?–?
- Uro Eso Yusuf Ayeva 1986?–present
