= List of Zoroastrian states and dynasties =

This is a list of historical states and dynasties that were notable for their predominant observance of Zoroastrianism, an Iranian religion founded by the spiritual leader Zoroaster.

- Teispid Kingdom (688 BC – 550 BC)
- Median Empire (678 BCE – 549 BCE)
- Achaemenid Empire (550 BCE – 330 BCE)
- Kingdom of Atropatene (323 BCE – 226 CE)
- Kingdom of Armenia (321 BCE – 330 CE)
- Kingdom of Iberia (302 BC – 580 AD)
- Kingdom of Sophene (260 BCE – 95 BCE)
- Parthian Empire (247 BCE – 224 CE)
- Frataraka dynasty (164 BCE – 132 BCE)
- Kingdom of Persis (132 BCE – 224 CE)
- Sasanian Empire (224 – 651)
- Kushano-Sasanian Kingdom (230 – 365 / 565 – 651)
- Afrighid dynasty (305 – 995)
- Principality of Chaghaniyan (5th century-10th century?)
- Qarinvand dynasty (550s – 11th century)
- Principality of Ushrusana (c.600-822)
- Ikhshids of Sogdia (642-755)
- Dabuyid dynasty (642 – 760)
- Masmughans of Damavand (651 – 760)
- Bavand dynasty (651 – 842)
- Baduspanids (665 – 9th century)
- Bukhar Khudahs (681-890s)

== See also ==
- Zoroastrianism
