= Taifa of Purchena =

Medieval Moorish taifa kingdom

- 1145–1150
- Capital: Purchena
- Common languages: Arabic, Mozarabic, Hebrew
- Religion: Islam, Christianity (Roman Catholicism), Judaism
- Government: Monarchy
- Historical era: Middle Ages
  - Established: 1145
  - Conquered by Murcia: 1150
- Currency: Dirham and Dinar
| Preceded by | Succeeded by |
| Almohad dynasty | Taifa of Murcia |

The Taifa of Purchena (Arabic: طائفة بُرْشَانَة) was a medieval Al-Andalus taifa kingdom. Centered in Purchena, it existed from 1145 to 1150. It was ruled by the Arab tribe of Banu Khazraj.

== List of Emirs ==
=== Miqdamid dynasty ===
- Ibn Miqdam: fl. mid-12th century (1145–1150)
  - To Murcia: c. 1150–1172
