= List of Tengrist states and dynasties =

This is a list of khanates, empires and kingdoms who predominantly followed Tengrism, a Central Asian shamanistic religion.

- Xiongnu (209 BCE–93 CE)
- Xianbei state (93BCE–234)
- Rouran Khaganate (330–555)
- Huns (370s–469)
- First Turkic Khaganate (552–659)
- Old Great Bulgaria (632–668)
- Volga Bulgaria (7th century–922)
- Khazar Khaganate (650–740)
- First Bulgarian Empire (681–864)
- Second Turkic Khaganate (682–744)
- Tatar confederation (8th century-1202)
- Uyghur Khaganate (744–840)
- Oghuz Yabgu State (766–1055)
- Kara-Khanid Khanate (840–934)
- Pecheneg Khanates (860-1091)
- Principality of Hungary (895–1000)
- Cumans
- Cumania (10th century-1241)
- Taichiud
- Khamag Mongol (10th century-1206)
- Merkits (11th century-1200)
- Mongol Empire (1206–1368)
- Yuan Dynasty (1271-1368)
- Northern Yuan (1368-1635)

== See also ==
- Tengrism
