= Banu Makki =

Northern African dynasty

Banu Makki was a Muslim dynasty that ruled over Gabès from 1282 until 1394.

== History ==
The Banu Makki were one of the notable families in Gabès during the rule of the Hafsids in Ifriqiya (the region around modern-day Tunisia). While the Hafsids appointed governors to the main cities of their provinces, powerful local families often exercised great influence. In the case of the Banu Makki, they were able to get one of their own members to be appointed as governor in Gabès. At their height, sometime the early 14th century, their domain extended from Gabès to Tripoli and the nearby Jabal Nafusa (in present-day Libya). By the mid-1350s, they had extended their control to both Tripoli and Sfax. During the second half of the 14th century they had formed an effectively independent state in this region. The region was only brought back under direct Hafsid control during the reign of Abu al-Abbas Ahmad II (r. 1371–1394), who progressively reasserted Hafsid authority across former territories.

== See also ==
- Hafsid dynasty
