= List of Buddhist kingdoms and empires =

This list includes Buddhist kingdoms, empires, and khanates in South Asia, Southeast Asia, East Asia, Central Asia, West Asia, and Eastern Europe.

== South Asia ==
Buddhist Kingdoms and Empires in South Asia
Kingdom; or Empire	Established	Disestablished	Capital(s)	Language(s)	Today parts of
Haryanka dynasty	544 BCE	413 BCE	Rajagriha, Pataliputra	Sanskrit, Magadhi Prakrit, Ardhamagadhi	India
Shaishunga dynasty	413 BCE	345 BC	Rajgir, Vaishali, Pataliputra	Sanskirt, Magadhi Prakit	India
Kosala	7th century BCE	5th century BCE	Ayodhya, Shravasti	Sanskrit	India; Nepal
Malla	7th century BCE	4th century BCE	Kusinara, Pava	Prakrit	India
Vajjika League	6th century BCE	468 BCE	Vesali	Prakrit, Sanskrit	India; Nepal
Anuradhapura Kingdom	437 BCE	1017 CE	Anuradhapura	Sinhala	Sri Lanka
Maurya Empire	322 BCE	185 BCE	Pataliputra	Magadhi Prakrit	India; Pakistan; Bangladesh; Afghanistan; Nepal; Tajikistan; Iran
Apracharajas	52 BCE	78 CE	Gandhari Prakrit	Bajaur District	Afghanistan; Pakistan
Western Satraps	35 CE	415 CE	Ujjain, Barygaza, Minnagara	Pali, Prakrit, Sanskrit	India; Pakistan
Northern Satraps	60 BCE	2nd century CE	Sagala, Mathura	Sanskrit	India; Pakistan
Khadga dynasty	625 CE	716 CE	Karmanta Vasaka		India; Bangladesh
Pithipatis of Magadha	1120 CE	1290 CE	Bodhgaya	Sanskrit	India
Kingdom of Sikkim	1642 CE	1975 CE	Yuksom, Rabdentse, Tumlong, Gangtok	Chöke, Sikkimese	India
Pala Empire	750 CE	1161 CE	Bikrampur, Pataliputra, Somapura	Sanskrit	India; Bangladesh
Kingdom of Polonnaruwa	1055 CE	1232 CE	Polonnaruwa	Sinhala, Sanskrit	Sri Lanka; India
Kingdom of Dambadeniya	1220 CE	1345 CE	Dambadeniya, Yapahuwa, Polonnaruwa, Kurunagala	Sinhala	Sri Lanka
Kingdom of Gampola	1341 CE	1408 CE	Gampola	Sinhala	Sri Lanka
Kingdom of Kotte	1412 CE	1597 CE	Kotte	Sinhala	Sri Lanka
Kingdom of Sitawaka	1521 CE	1594 CE	Sitawaka	Sinhala	Sri Lanka
Kingdom of Kandy	1469 CE	1815 CE	Kandy	Sinhala, Tamil	Sri Lanka

== Southeast Asia ==
=== Indonesia ===
- Srivijaya (671–1025): Indonesia, Malaysia, Singapore, Thailand

=== Malaysia ===
- Langkasuka (1st century–15th century): Malaysia, Thailand, Myanmar

=== Philippines ===
- Tondo (before 900–1589): Philippines

=== Myanmar ===
Kingdom; or Empire	Established	Disestablished	Capital(s)	Language(s)	Today parts of
Pyu-city State	2nd century BCE	1050 CE	Sri Ksetra, Halin, Beikthano, Pinle, Binnaka	Pyu	Myanmar
Thaton Kingdom	4th century BCE	1057 May 18	Thaton	Mon	Myanmar
Pagan Kingdom	849 CE	1297 CE	Pagan	Old Burmese, Mon, Pyu	Myanmar
Myinsaing Kingdom	1297 CE	1313 CE	Myinsaing, Mekkhaya, Pinle	Burmese, Shan, Mon	
Hanthawaddy kingdom	1287 CE	1552 CE	Marthaban, Donwun, Pegu	Mon, Old Burmese	Myanmar; Thailand
Shan States	1215 CE	1885 CE	Mogaung	Shan, Burmese	
Pinya Kingdom	1313 CE	1365 CE	Pinya	Burmese	Myanmar
Sagaing Kingdom	1315 CE	1365 CE	Sagaing	Burmese	Myanmar
Kingdom of Ava	1365 CE	1555 CE	Sagaing, Pinya, Ava	Old Burmese, Shan	Myanmar
Kingdom of Mrauk U	1429 CE	1785 CE	Mrauk U	Arakanese, Burmese	Myanmar; Bangladesh
Prome Kingdom	1482 CE	1542 CE	Prome	Burmese	Myanmar
Toungoo dynasty	1510 CE	1752 CE	Toungoo, Pegu, Ava	Burmese	Myanmar; Thailand; Laos; India; China
Konbaung dynasty	1752 CE	1885 CE	Shwebo, Sagaing, Ava, Amarapura, Mandalay	Burmese	Myanmar; Thailand; India; China

=== Thailand ===
Kingdom; or Empire	Established	Disestablished	Capital(s)	Language(s)	Today parts of
Dvaravati	7th century CE	11th century CE		Mon	Thailand
Lavo Kingdom	648 CE	1388 CE	Lavo, Ayutthaya	Mon, Old Khmer, Thai	Thailand
Haripunchai	629 CE	1292 CE	Haripunchai	Northern Thai, Pali, Mon, Lawa	Thailand
Ngoenyang	638 CE	1292 CE	Hiran, Ngoenyang	Northern Thai	Thailand
Phayao Kingdom	1094 CE	1338 CE	Phayao	Tai	Thailand
Sukhothai Kingdom	1238 CE	1584 CE	Sukhothai, Song Khwae	Sukhothai	Thailand; Myanmar; Malaysia; Laos
Nakhon SI Thammarat Kingdom	13th century CE	1782 CE	Nakhon Si Tammarat	Southern Thai, Pali, Sanskrit, Malay language, Tamil	Thailand
Lan Na	1292 CE	1775 January 15	Chiang Rai, Fang, Wiang Kum Kam, Chiang Mai	Northern Thai, Burmese language	Thailand; Myanmar
Ayutthaya Kingdom	1351 CE	1767 CE	Ayutthaya, Phitsanulok, Lopburi	Siamese	Thailand; Myanmar; Cambodia; Malaysia
Thonburi Kingdom	1767 CE	1782 CE	Thonburi	Thai	Thailand; Laos
Rattanakosin Kingdom	1782 CE	1932 CE	Bangkok	Central Thai	Thailand; Myanmar

=== Cambodia ===
Kingdom; or Empire	Established	Disestablished	Capital(s)	Language(s)	Today parts of
Chenla	550 CE	802 CE	Isanapura	Old Khmer, Sanskrit	Cambodia; Thailand; Laos; Vietnam
Khmer Empire	802 CE	1431 CE	Mahendraparvata, Hariharalaya, Koh Ker, Yashodharapura	Old Khmer, Sanskrit, Dravidian languages	Cambodia; Laos; Vietnam; Thailand
Post-Angkor Period	1431 CE	1863 CE	Chaktomuk, Longvek, Lvea Aem, Oudong	Middle Khmer, Khmer language	Cambodia; Thailand; Vietnam

=== Laos ===
Kingdom; or Empire	Established	Disestablished	Capital(s)	Language(s)	Today parts of
Lan Xang	1353 CE	1707 CE	Luang Prabang, Vientiane	Lao	Laos; Thailand
Kingdom of Luang Prabang	1707 CE	1893 CE	Luang Prabang	Lao	Laos; Thailand; Vietnam; China
Kingdom of Vientiane	1707 CE	1828 CE	Vientiane	Lao	Laos; Thailand
Kingdom of Champasak	1713 CE	1904 CE	Champasak	Lao	Laos; Thailand; Cambodia; Vietnam
Muang Phuan	1707 CE	1899 CE	Muang Phuan	Lao	Laos; Vietnam

== East Asia ==
=== Northern China and Mongolian Plateau ===
Kingdom; or Empire	Established	Disestablished	Capital(s)	Language(s)	Today parts of
Rouran Khaganate	330 CE	555 CE	Gansu, Mumocheng	Rouran, Mongolian, Chinese	China; Mongolia; Kazakhstan; Russia
Uyghur Khaganate	744 CE	847 CE	Otuken, Ordu-Baliq	Old Uyghur, Middle Chinese	China; Mongolia; Kazakhstan; Russia
Liao dynasty	916 CE	1125 CE	Shangjing	Khitan, Middle Chinese, Jurchen	China; Mongolia; North Korea; Russia
Yuan dynasty	1271 CE	1368 CE	Khanbaliq	Middle Mongol, Chinese, Old Uyghur	China; Mongolia; Myanmar; North Korea; Russia; South Korea
Northern Yuan dynasty	1368 CE	1635 CE	Shangdu, Yingchang, Karakorum	Mongolian, Chinese, Jurchen	China; Mongolia; Russia
Four Oirat	1399 CE	1634 CE		Mongolic (Oirat language)	China; Mongolia; Russia
Bogd Khanate	1911 CE	1924 CE	Niislel Khuree	Mongolian	Mongolia; Russia

=== Korea ===
Kingdom; or Empire	Established	Disestablished	Capital(s)	Language(s)	Today parts of
Silla	57 BCE	935 CE	Seorabeo	Old Korean, Middle Chinese	North Korea; South Korea
Goguryeo	37 BCE	668 CE	Jolbon, Gungnae, Pyongyang	Goguryeo, Classic Chinese	North Korea; South Korea; China
Baekje	18 BCE	660 CE	Wirye, Ungjin	Baekje, Classic Chinese	North Korea; South Korea
Gaya confederacy	42 CE	562 CE	Gaya		South Korea
Balhae	698 CE	926 CE	Dunhua	GoguryeoTungusic, Middle Chinese	North Korea; China; Russia
Later Baekje	892 CE	936 CE	Wansanju	Old Korean, Classic Chinese	South Korea
Unified Silla	668 CE	935 CE	Seorabeol	Old Korean, Middle Chinese	North Korea; South Korea; China
Taebong	901 CE	918 CE	Songak, Cheolwon	Old Korean, Classic Chinese	North Korea; South Korea
Goryeo	918 CE	1392 CE	Gaegyeong	Middle Korean, Classic Chinese	North Korea; South Korea

=== Tibetan Plateau ===
Kingdom; or Empire	Established	Disestablished	Capital(s)	Language(s)	Today parts of
Tibetan Empire	618 CE	842 CE	Lhasa	Tibetic languages	China; Tajikistan; Kyrgyzstan; Afghanistan; Pakistan; Bhutan; India
Phagmodrupa dynasty	1354 CE	1618 CE	Nêdong	Tibetan language	China
Rinpungpa	1435 CE	1565 CE	Shigatse	Tibetan language	China
Tsangpa dynasty	1565 CE	1642 CE	Shigatse	Tibetan language	China
Khoshut Khanate	1642 CE	1717 CE		Tibetan language, Oirat language	China
Ganden Phodrang	1642 CE	1959 CE	Lhasa	Classical Tibetan and Standard Tibetan languages	China

== West Asia, East Europe ==
=== West Asia ===
- Ilkhanate (1256–1335):
  - Iraq
  - Iran
  - Syria
  - Turkey
  - Azerbaijan
  - Armenia
  - Georgia
  - Russia
  - Turkmenistan
  - Afghanistan
  - Tajikistan

=== Eastern Europe ===
- Kalmyk Khanate (1630–1771): Russia Kazakhstan

== Central Asia ==
- Kingdom of Khotan (300 BC–1006 AD):
  - China
  - Tajikistan
- Indo-Greek Kingdom (200 BC–10 AD):
  - Afghanistan
  - Pakistan
  - India
- Hephthalites (440s–710):
  - Uzbekistan
  - Afghanistan
  - China

== See also ==
- History of Buddhism
- Buddhism
