= Hormizd III =

Shahanshah of the Sasanian Empire from 457 to 459

Hormizd III; 𐭠𐭥𐭧𐭥𐭬𐭦𐭣
- King of Kings of Iranians and non-Iranians
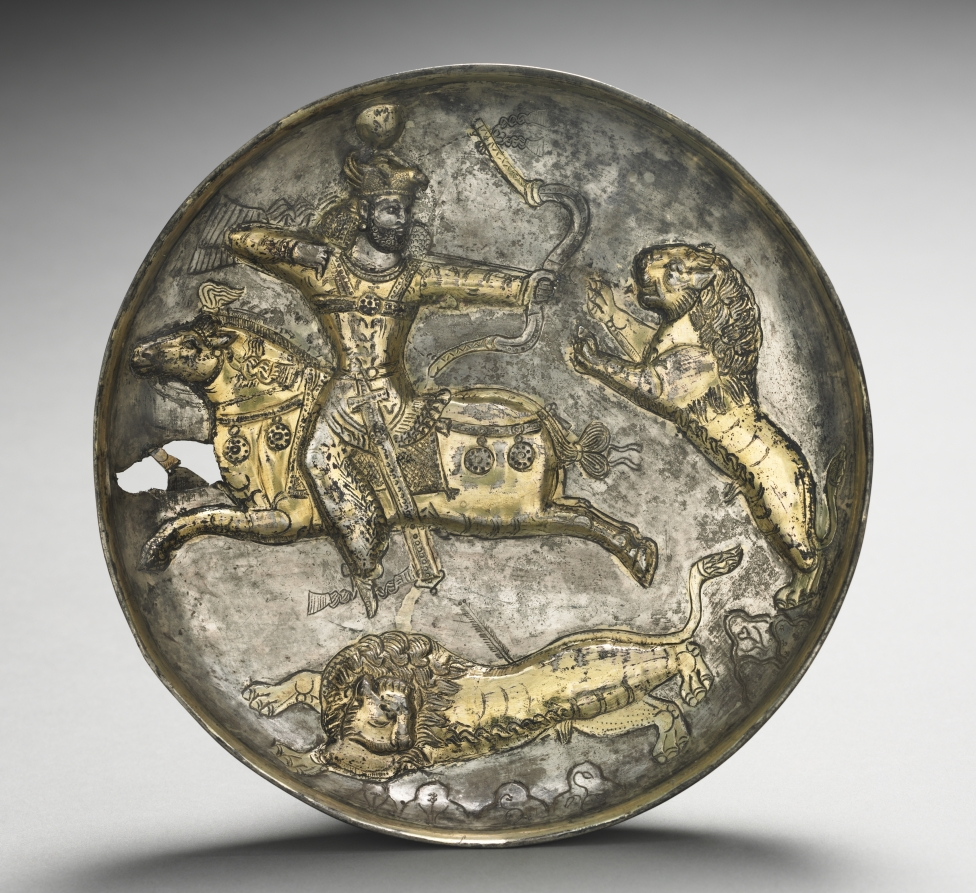
- Plate of a Sasanian king hunting lions, most likely Hormizd III

Shahanshah of the Sasanian Empire
- Reign: 457 – 459
- Coronation: Ray
- Predecessor: Yazdegerd II
- Successor: Peroz I
- Regent: Denag
- Died: 459
- Issue: Balendukht
- House: House of Sasan
- Father: Yazdegerd II
- Mother: Denag
- Religion: Zoroastrianism

Hormizd III (Middle Persian: 𐭠𐭥𐭧𐭥𐭬𐭦𐭣; New Persian: هرمز سوم) was the seventeenth king (shah) of the Sasanian Empire, ruling briefly from 457 to 459. He was the son and successor of Yazdegerd II (r. 438–457). His reign was marked by the rebellion of his younger brother Peroz I, who with the aid of one of the Seven Great Houses of Iran, the House of Mihran, and the eastern neighbours of the Sasanians, the Hephthalites, had him captured and executed.

== Etymology ==
The name of Hormizd (also spelled Ōhrmazd, Hormozd) is the Middle Persian version of the name of the supreme deity in Zoroastrianism, known in Avestan as Ahura Mazda. The Old Persian equivalent is Auramazdā, whilst the Greek transliteration is Hormisdas. The name is attested in Armenian as Ormizd and in Georgian as Urmizd.

== Biography ==
Hormizd III was the eldest son and heir of the Sasanian shah Yazdegerd II, and governed the eastern province of Sakastan during his father's reign. The province was far away from the imperial court in Ctesiphon, and had since its conquest by Ardashir I (r. 224–240) been governed by Sasanian princes, who held title of sakanshah ("king of the Saka"). When Yazdegerd I died in 457, Hormizd ascended the throne at Ray. His younger brother Peroz I, with the support of the powerful Mihranid magnate Raham Mihran, fled to the northeastern part of the empire and began raising an army in order to claim the throne for himself. The empire thus fell into a dynastic struggle and became divided; the mother of the two brothers, Denag, temporarily ruled as regent of the empire from its capital, Ctesiphon. According to eastern sources, Peroz was more worthy for the throne than Hormizd, who is called unjust. Only the anonymous source known as the Codex Sprenger 30 describes Hormizd as the "braver and better", whilst describing Peroz as "more learned in religion".

The Arsacid ruler of Caucasian Albania, Vache II (r. 444–463), who was the nephew of the two brothers through his mother, and had been forced to convert to Zoroastrianism by Yazdegerd II, took advantage of the dispute by declaring independence and reverting to Christianity. Peroz later went to the domains of the Hephthalite monarch, who agreed to support him with soldiers in his struggle for the throne. In 459, Peroz, with Hephthalite and Mihranid assistance, led an army against Hormizd and defeated him. According to some sources, Hormizd was pardoned and spared by his brother. However, this is most likely a legend, due to being contradicted by other sources, which state Peroz had Hormizd and three members of his family killed. Peroz I afterwards fully incorporated Sakastan into the empire by appointing an aristocrat from the House of Karen as governor. Hormizd was thus the last person to wield the title of sakanshah. No coins minted during Hormizd's reign has been found.

== Family ==
Hormizd was survived by his two daughters, who were:

- Balendukht, the wife of Vakhtang I, the ruler of Iberia. She bore the latter a son named Dachi.
- An unnamed daughter, who was the wife of Varsken, Viceroy of Gugark and later Caucasian Albania.

== Sources ==
- Christensen, Peter (1993). The Decline of Iranshahr: Irrigation and Environments in the History of the Middle East, 500 B.C. to A.D. 1500. Museum Tusculanum Press. pp. 1–351. ISBN 978-87-7289-259-7.
- Daryaee, Touraj (2008). Sasanian Persia: The Rise and Fall of an Empire. I.B.Tauris. pp. 1–240. ISBN 978-0-85771-666-8.
- Kia, Mehrdad (2016). The Persian Empire: A Historical Encyclopedia [2 volumes]: A Historical Encyclopedia. ABC-CLIO. ISBN 978-1-61069-391-2.
- Pourshariati, Parvaneh (2008). Decline and Fall of the Sasanian Empire: The Sasanian-Parthian Confederacy and the Arab Conquest of Iran. London and New York: I.B.Tauris. ISBN 978-1-84511-645-3.
- Rapp, Stephen H. Jr (2014). The Sasanian World through Georgian Eyes: Caucasia and the Iranian Commonwealth in Late Antique Georgian Literature. Routledge. ISBN 978-1-4724-2552-2.
- Schmitt, R.; Bailey, H. W. (1986). "ARMENIA AND IRAN iv. Iranian influences in Armenian Language". Encyclopaedia Iranica, Vol. II, Fasc. 4-5. pp. 445–465.
- Shahbazi, A. Shapur (2004). "Hormozd III". In Yarshater, Ehsan (ed.). Encyclopædia Iranica. Vol. XII/5: Homosexuality III–Human migration II. London and New York: Routledge & Kegan Paul. pp. 465–466. ISBN 978-0-933273-79-5.
- Shayegan, M. Rahim (2004). "Hormozd I". In Yarshater, Ehsan (ed.). Encyclopædia Iranica. Vol. XII/5: Homosexuality III–Human migration II. London and New York: Routledge & Kegan Paul. pp. 462–464. ISBN 978-0-933273-79-5.
- Vevaina, Yuhan; Canepa, Matthew (2018). "Ohrmazd". In Nicholson, Oliver (ed.). The Oxford Dictionary of Late Antiquity. Oxford: Oxford University Press. ISBN 978-0-19-866277-8.

Hormizd III Sasanian dynasty Died: 459
Preceded by Yazdegerd II	King of Kings of Iran and non-Iran; 457–459	Succeeded by Peroz I
