= Sakastan (Sasanian province) =

Province of the Sasanian Empire

Sakastan Sagistān
- Province of the Sasanian Empire
- c. 240–650/1
- Map of the southeastern provinces of the Sasanian Empire.
- Capital: Zrang
- Historical era: Late Antiquity
  - Established: c. 240
  - Annexed by the Rashidun Caliphate: 650/1
Preceded by	Succeeded by
Indo-Parthians	Rashidun Caliphate
- Today part of: Afghanistan; Iran

Sakastan (also known as Sagestān, Sagistan, Seyanish, Segistan, Sistan, and Sijistan) was a Sasanian province in Late Antiquity, that lay within the kust of Nemroz. The province bordered Kirman in the west, Spahan in the north west, Kushanshahr in the north east, and Turan in the south east. The governor of the province held the title of marzban. The governor also held the title of "Sakanshah" (king of the Saka) until the title was abolished in ca. 459/60.

== Etymology ==
The word "Sakastan" means "the land of the Saka", a Scythian group which from the 2nd century BC to the 1st century migrated to the Iranian Plateau and India, where they carved a kingdom known as the Indo-Scythian Kingdom. In the Bundahishn, a Zoroastrian scripture written in Pahlavi, the province is written as "Seyansih". After the Arab conquest of Iran, the province became known as "Sijistan" and later as "Sistan", which still remains a province to this day in Iran (Sistan and Baluchestan Province).

== History ==
The province was formed in ca. 240, during the reign of Shapur I (r. 240–270), as part of his intention to centralise his empire - before that, the province was under the rule of the Parthian Suren Kingdom, whose ruler Ardashir Sakanshah became a Sasanian vassal during the reign of Shapur's father Ardashir I (r. 224–242), who also had the ancient city Zrang rebuilt, which became the capital of the province.

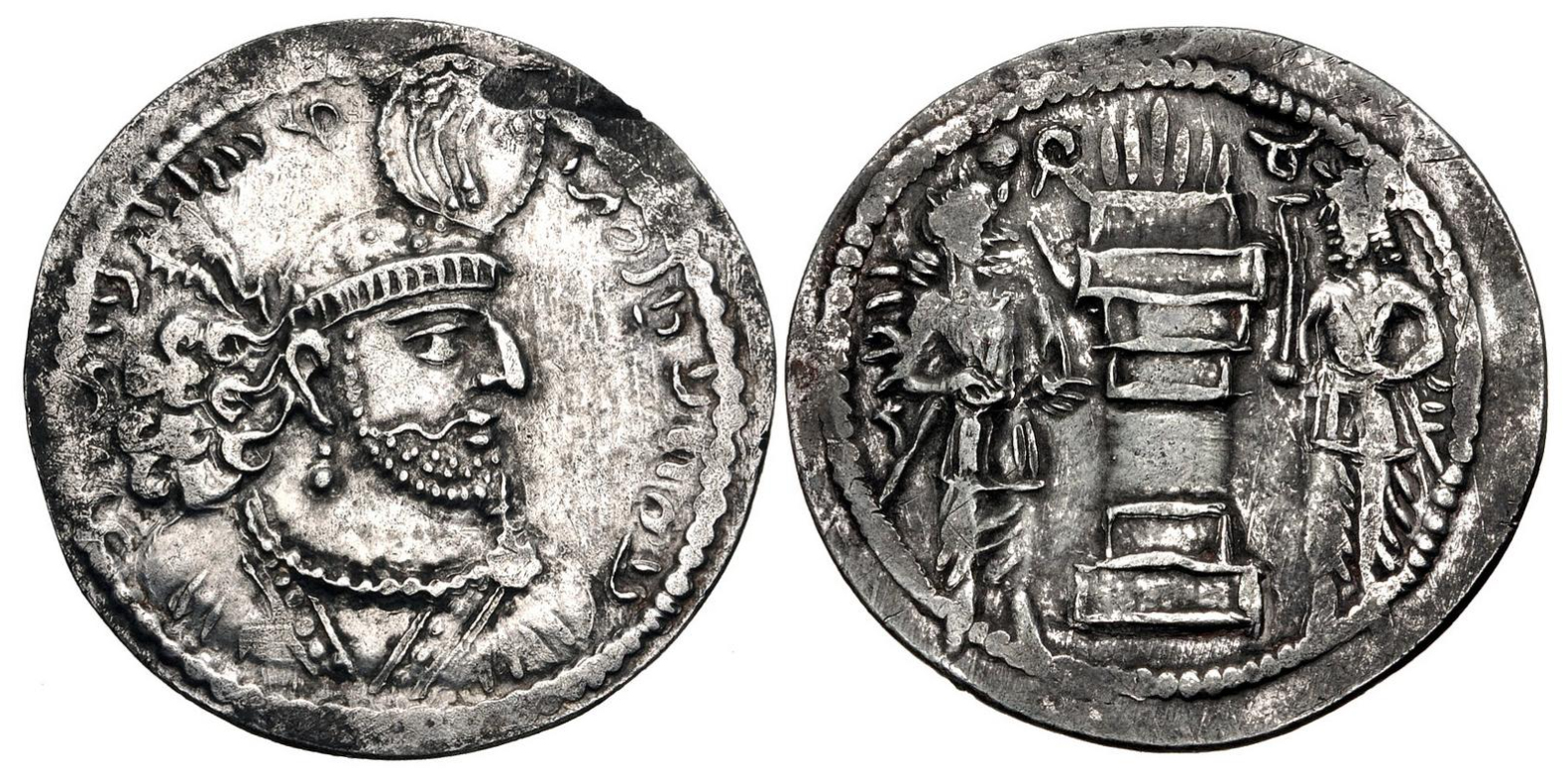
Coinage of Narseh (Narsē). AD 293-303. Sakastan mint.

Shapur's son Narseh was the first to be appointed as the governor of the province, which he would govern until 271, when the Sasanian prince Hormizd was appointed as the new governor.

Later in ca. 281, Hormizd revolted against his cousin Bahram II (r. 274–293). During the revolt, the people of Sakastan was one of his supporters. Nevertheless, Bahram II managed to suppress the revolt in 283, and appointed his son Bahram III as the governor of the province. During the early reign of Shapur II (r. 309-379), he appointed his brother Shapur Sakanshah as the governor of Sakastan. Peroz I (r. 459–484), during his early reign, put an end to dynastic rule in province by appointing a Karenid as its governor. The reason behind the appointment was to avoid further family conflict in the province, and in order to gain more direct control of the province.

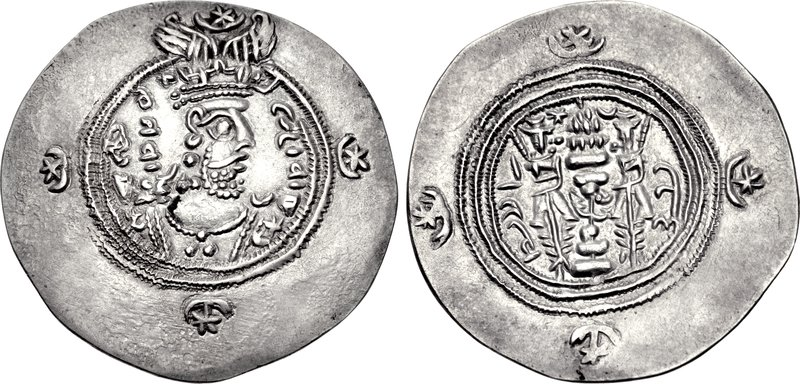
Silver coin of Yazdegerd III, struck in Sakastan, dated 651

During the Muslim conquest of Persia, the last Sasanian king Yazdegerd III fled to Sakastan in the mid-640s, where its governor Aparviz (who was more or less independent), helped him. However, Yazdegerd III quickly lost this support when he demanded tax money that Aparviz had failed to pay.

=== Arab conquest ===
In 650/1, Abd-Allah ibn Amir, who had recently conquered Kirman, sent Rabi ibn Ziyad Harithi to an expedition in Sakastan. After some time, he reached Zaliq, a border town between Kirman and Sakastan, where he forced the dehqan of the town to acknowledge Rashidun authority. He then did the same at the fortress of Karkuya, which had a famous fire temple, which is mentioned in the Tarikh-i Sistan.

He then continued to seize more land in the province. He thereafter besieged Zrang, and after a heavy battle outside the city, Aparviz and his men surrendered. When Aparviz went to Rabi to discuss about the conditions of a treaty, he saw that he was using the bodies of two dead soldiers as a chair. This horrified Aparviz, who in order to spare the inhabitants of Sakastan from the Arabs, made peace with the Arabs in return for heavy tribute, which included a tribute of 1,000 slave boys bearing 1,000 golden vessels. Sakastan was thus under the control of the Rashidun Caliphate.

== Population and religion ==
During the Achaemenid period, Sakastan (then known as Drangiana), was populated by a Persianized east Iranian group known as the Drangians. From the 2nd century BC to the 1st century, Sakastan saw a huge influx of Saka tribesmen and also some Parthians, which, in the words of Brunner, "reshaped the region's older population pattern".

The inhabitants of Sakastan were mainly Zoroastrian, while a minority of them were Nestorian Christians.

== House of Suren ==
The House of Suren, a Parthian noble family that served the Parthian and later the Sasanian Empire, was part of the seven Parthian clans of the Sasanian Empire—each family owned land in different parts of the empire, the Surens owning land in parts of Sakastan.

== Mint ==
Under Shapur II, a Sasanian mint was established in Sakastan (mint-mark: SKSTN, S, SK). From the first reign of Kavad I (r. 488–496) onwards, this mint was located at the provincial capital Zrang (mint-mark: ZR, ZRN, ZRNG).

== List of known governors ==
- Narseh (240–271)
- Bahram II (271-274)
- Hormizd of Sakastan (274–283)
- Bahram III (283–293)
- Shapur Sakanshah (early 4th-century)
- Hormizd III (???–457)
- Unnamed Karen aristocrat (459/60-???)
- Sukhra (???-484)
- Bakhtiyar of Sakastan (under Khosrau II)
- Rostam of Sakastan (early 7th-century)
- Aparviz of Sakastan (???–650/1)

== Sources ==
- Greatrex, Geoffrey; Lieu, Samuel N. C. (2002). The Roman Eastern Frontier and the Persian Wars (Part II, 363–630 AD). New York, New York and London, United Kingdom: Routledge (Taylor & Francis). ISBN 0-415-14687-9.
- Pourshariati, Parvaneh (2008). Decline and Fall of the Sasanian Empire: The Sasanian-Parthian Confederacy and the Arab Conquest of Iran. London and New York: I.B. Tauris. ISBN 978-1-84511-645-3.
- Zarrinkub, Abd al-Husain (1975). "The Arab conquest of Iran and its aftermath". The Cambridge History of Iran, Volume 4: From the Arab Invasion to the Saljuqs. Cambridge: Cambridge University Press. pp. 1–57. ISBN 978-0-521-20093-6.
- Morony, M. (1986). "ʿARAB ii. Arab conquest of Iran". Encyclopaedia Iranica, Vol. II, Fasc. 2. pp. 203–210.
- Potts, Daniel (2018). "Sagastan". In Nicholson, Oliver (ed.). The Oxford Dictionary of Late Antiquity. Oxford: Oxford University Press. ISBN 978-0-19-866277-8.
- Christensen, Peter (1993). The Decline of Iranshahr: Irrigation and Environments in the History of the Middle East, 500 B.C. to A.D. 1500. Museum Tusculanum Press. pp. 1–351. ISBN 9788772892597.
- Shapur Shahbazi, A. (2005). "SASANIAN DYNASTY". Encyclopaedia Iranica, Online Edition.
- Frye, Richard Nelson (1984). The History of Ancient Iran. C.H.Beck. pp. 1–411. ISBN 9783406093975. "The history of ancient iran."
- Schmitt, R. (1995). "DRANGIANA". Encyclopaedia Iranica, Vol. II, Fasc. 5. pp. 534–537.
- Bosworth, Clifford Edmund (1997). "Sīstān". The Encyclopedia of Islam, New Edition, Volume IX: San–Sze. Leiden, and New York: BRILL. pp. 681–685. ISBN 9789004082656.
- Gazerani, Saghi (2015). The Sistani Cycle of Epics and Iran's National History: On the Margins of Historiography. BRILL. pp. 1–250. ISBN 9789004282964.
- Brunner, Christopher (1968). "Geographical and Administrative divisions: Settlements and Economy". In Fischer, William B. (ed.). The Cambridge History of Iran. Vol. 3b. Cambridge: Cambridge University Press. pp. 747–778. ISBN 0-521-06935-1.
