= Zik =

Zik may refer to:

== People ==
- House of Zik, an Iranian noble family during the Parthian and Sasanian rule in Iran
  - Zik (general), 4th century Sasanian general
- Zik Kaghan, Western Turk ruler (608-618)
- Nnamdi Azikiwe (1904–1996), also known as Zik of Africa, a founding father of modern Nigeria
- Adir Zik (1939-2005), Israeli television producer and journalist

== Brands ==
- 'Zik, a French television channel
- Kalinin Machine-Building Plant or ZiK for short (Russian: Машиностроительный завод имени М.И.Калинина, ЗиК), a Russian industrial factory
- ZIK, a pro-Russian Ukrainian closed television channel

== Other ==
- Zik Prize, a leadership award named in honour of Nnamdi Azikiwe
- Zimakani language (ISO 639-3: zik), a Papuan language
