= Yazdegerd II =

Shahanshah of the Sasanian Empire from 438 to 457

Yazdegerd II 𐭩𐭦𐭣𐭪𐭥𐭲𐭩
- King of Kings of Iranians and non-Iranians
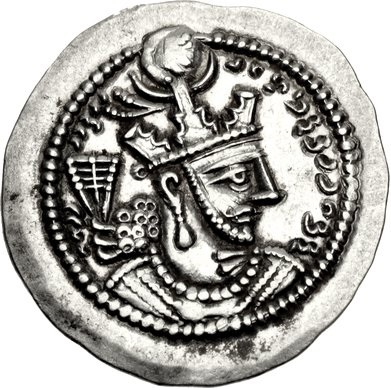
- Drachma of Yazdegerd II, minted at Gurgan or Qom between 439-447

Shahanshah of the Sasanian Empire
- Reign: 438–457
- Predecessor: Bahram V
- Successor: Hormizd III
- Died: 457
- Consort: Denag
- Issue: Hormizd III; Peroz I; Balash; Zarer; Vachagan III (?)
- House: House of Sasan
- Father: Bahram V
- Mother: Sapinud
- Religion: Zoroastrianism

Yazdegerd II (also spelled Yazdgerd and Yazdgird; Middle Persian: 𐭩𐭦𐭣𐭪𐭥𐭲𐭩), was the Sasanian King of Kings (shahanshah) of Iran from 438 to 457. He was the successor and son of Bahram V (r. 420–438).

His reign was marked by wars against the Eastern Roman Empire in the west and the Kidarites in the east, as well as by his efforts and attempts to strengthen royal centralisation in the bureaucracy by imposing Zoroastrianism on the non-Zoroastrians within the country, namely the Christians. This backfired in Armenia, culminating in a large-scale rebellion led by the military leader Vardan Mamikonian, who was ultimately defeated and killed at the Battle of Avarayr in 451. Nevertheless, religious freedom was subsequently allowed in the country.

Yazdegerd II was the first Sasanian ruler to assume the title of kay ("king"), which evidently associates him and the dynasty to the mythical Kayanian dynasty commemorated in the Avesta. His death led to a dynastic struggle between his two sons Hormizd III and Peroz I for the throne, with the latter emerging victorious.

== Etymology ==
The name of Yazdegerd is a combination of the Old Iranian yazata- "divine being" and -kərta "made", and thus stands for "God-made", comparable to Iranian Bagkart and Greek Theoktistos. The name of Yazdegerd is known in other languages as; Pahlavi Yazdekert; New Persian Yazd(e)gerd; Syriac Yazdegerd, Izdegerd, and Yazdeger; Armenian Yazkert; Talmudic Izdeger and Azger; Arabic Yazdeijerd; Greek Isdigerdes.

== War with the Romans ==
Map of the Roman-Iranian frontier

In 438, shah Bahram V (r. 420–438) died, and was succeeded by Yazdegerd II. His western neighbours, the Romans, had since their peace treaty with Iran in 387 agreed that both empires were obligated to cooperate in the defense of the Caucasus against nomadic attacks. The Romans helped in the defense of the Caucasus by paying the Iranians roughly 500 lbs (226 kg) of gold at irregular intervals. While the Romans saw this payment as political subsidies, the Iranians saw it as tribute, which proved that Rome was the deputy of Iran. The Roman emperor Theodosius II's unwillingness to continue the payment made Yazdegerd II declare war against the Romans, which had ultimately little success for either side.

The Romans were invaded in their southern provinces by the Vandals, causing Theodosius II to ask for peace and send his commander, Anatolius, personally to Yazdegerd II's camp. In the ensuing negotiations in 440, both empires promised not to build any new fortifications in Mesopotamia and that the Sasanian Empire would get some payment in order to protect the Caucasus from incursions.

== War with the Huns ==
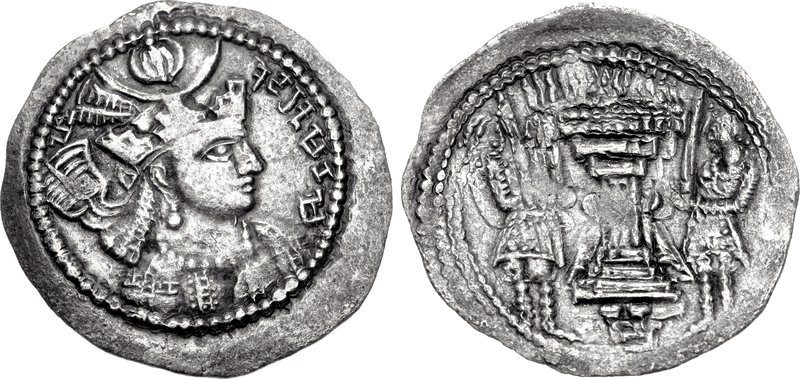
5th-century drachma of a Kidarite ruler

Since the reign of Shapur II (r. 309–379), Iran had to deal with nomadic invaders in the east known as "Iranian Huns" and made up of Hephthalites, Kidarites, Chionites and Alkhans. They seized Tokharistan and Gandhara from Shapur II and his Kushano-Sasanian clients, and eventually Kabul from Shapur III (r. 383–388). Archaeological, numismatic, and sigillographic evidence demonstrates the Huns ruled a realm just as refined as that of the Sasanians. They swiftly adopted Iranian imperial symbolism and titulature. Their coins also imitated Sasanian imperial coinage. The modern historian Richard Payne states: "Far from the destructive xyonan of the Iranian accounts or the marauding barbarians of the Roman historians, the Hun kingdoms of post-Iranian Central Asia were city-based, tax-raising, ideologically innovative states the kings of kings found themselves hard pressed to unseat". Hard-pressed by the Huns, Iran fought an almost uninterrupted war with them on its northern and northeastern marches, notably under Bahram V and Yazdegerd II, who both attempted to regain Tokharistan, but only succeeded in preserving Abarshahr. The Sasanian efforts were disrupted in the early 5th century by the Kidarites, who forced Yazdegerd I (r. 399–420), Bahram V, and/or Yazdegerd II to pay them tribute. Although this did not trouble the Iranian treasury, it was nevertheless humiliating. Yazdegerd II eventually refused to pay tribute.

In 450, he launched an expedition into deep Kidarite territory in Central Asia, raiding and capturing forts and cities, which resulted in the accumulation of many captives and riches. In 453, he moved his court to Nishapur in Abarshahr to face the threat from the Kidarites and left his minister (wuzurg framadar) Mihr Narseh in charge of the Sasanian Empire. He spent many years at war against the Kidarites. His forces initially suffered a severe defeat, but fighting continued. According to the Šahrestānīhā ī Ērānšahr ("The Provincial Capitals of Iran"), Yazdegerd II fortified the city of Damghan and turned it into a strong border post against the Kidarites. It was sometime during this period that Yazdegerd II created the province of Eran-Khwarrah-Yazdegerd ("Iran, glory of Yazdegerd"), which was in the northern part of the Gurgan province. After he managed to secure the eastern portion of his empire against the Kidarite incursions, Yazdegerd II shifted his focus on Armenia and Caucasian Albania to defend the Caucasus with the Romans against the increasing Hun threat.

== Religious policy ==
Map of the Caucasus

The policies of Yazdegerd II have been a matter of discussion. While the Armenian and Syriac portray him as a religious fanatic, Arabic and Persian portray him as a pious king who clashed with the aristocracy. A large portion of modern historiography has incorporated the former. The unsteadiness of the empire was ever-increasing under Yazdegerd II, who had an uneasy relationship with the aristocracy and was facing a great challenge by the Kidaritess in the east. At the beginning of Yazdegerd II's reign, he suffered several defeats at the hands of the Kidarites, for which he put the blame on the Christians, due to much of his cavalry consisting of Iberians and Armenians. Persecutions of Christians first started in 446 with the Christian nobles of Karkh in Mesopotamia, and later the Christian aristocracy of Iberia and Armenia. He seems to have mainly targeted the non-Zoroastrian aristocracy.

Yazdegerd II had originally continued his father's policies of appeasing the magnates. However, after some time, he turned away from them and started a policy of his own. When the magnates told him that his new policies had offended the people, he disagreed, saying that: "it is not correct for you to presume that the ways in which my father behaved towards you, maintaining you close to him, and bestowing upon you all that bounty, are incumbent upon all the kings that come after him ... each age has its own customs". Yazdegerd II, however, was still fully aware of the longstanding conflict between the crown and the nobility and priesthood, which had culminated in the murder of several Sasanian monarchs.

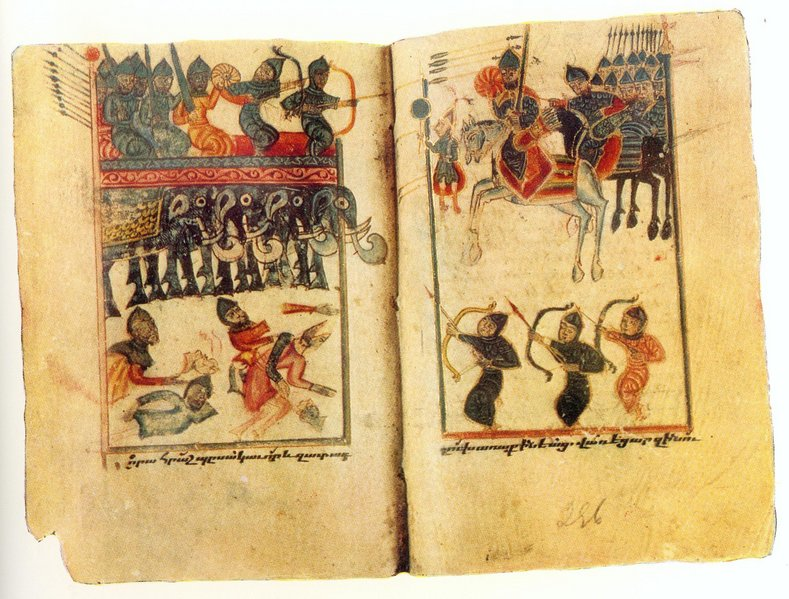
A 15th-century Armenian miniature depicting the Battle of Avarayr

Yazdegerd II needed the cooperation of the aristocracy so that he could have an organized government to combat the external and internal issues endangering the empire. His later dismissal of Vasak Siwni in 451 and allowance of religious freedom, according to modern historian Eberhard W. Sauer, is a "position hardly compatible with one taken by a religious zealot." According to another modern historian, Scott McDonough, the Zoroastrian faith was perhaps a "test of personal loyalty" for Yazdegerd II. He also targeted Zoroastrian aristocrats, dismantling their advantage of entry to the court and castrated men in his field armies to generate eunuchs more dutiful to him than to their own families. However, Yazdegerd II's policy of integrating the Christian nobility into the bureaucracy still had problematic consequences; before the appointment of Adhur-Hormizd, Armenia had been plunged into a major rebellion. The cause of the rebellion was the attempt of Mihr Narseh to impose the Zurvanite variant of Zoroastrianism in Armenia. His intentions differed from those of Yazdegerd II. As a result, many of the Armenian nobles (but not all) rallied under Vardan Mamikonian, the supreme commander (sparapet) of Armenia. The Armenian rebels tried to appeal to the Romans for help, but to no avail. Meanwhile, another faction of Armenians, led by the marzban (governor) Vasak Siwni allied themselves with the Sasanians.

On 2 June 451, the Sasanian and rebel forces clashed at Avarayr, with the Sasanians emerging victorious. Nine generals, including Vardan Mamikonian, were killed, with a large number of the Armenian nobles and soldiers meeting the same fate. The Sasanians, however, had also suffered heavy losses due to the resolute struggle by the Armenian rebels. Although Yazdegerd II put an end to the persecutions in the country afterward, tensions continued until 510 when a kinsman of Vardan Mamikonian, Vard Mamikonian, was appointed marzban by Yazdegerd II's grandson, Kavad I (r. 488–531).

Jews were also the subject of persecution under Yazdegerd II; he is said to have issued decrees prohibiting them from observing the Sabbath openly, and ordered executions of several Jewish leaders. The Jewish community of Spahan fought back by flaying two Zoroastrian priests alive, which in turn escalated the persecution they were already facing. This was the only outbreak of persecution directed against the Jews who were generally not persecuted by the Sasanians.

== Personality ==
Yazdegerd II was an astute and well-read ruler whose motto was "Question, examine, see. Let us choose and hold that which is best". He is generally praised in Persian sources, and is described as a compassionate and benevolent ruler. He is commended for abandoning his father's overindulgence in hunting, feasting, and having long audience sessions. According to the medieval historians Ibn al-Balkhi and Hamza al-Isfahani, he was known as "Yazdegerd the Gentle" (Yazdegerd-e Narm). However, the favorable account of Yazdegerd II is due to his policy of persecuting non-Zoroastrians within the empire, which appeased the Iranian aristocracy and especially the Zoroastrian priesthood, which sought to use the Sasanian Empire to impose their authority over the religious and cultural life of its people. This is the opposite of the policy of his grandfather and namesake, Yazdegerd I (known as the "sinner"), who is the subject of hostility in Persian sources due to his tolerant policy towards his non-Zoroastrian subjects, and his refusal to comply with the demands of the aristocracy and priesthood.

== Fortifications ==
In the 440s, Yazdegerd II had a mudbrick defensive system constructed at Derbent to fend off incursions from the north. An inscription on one of its walls report that the tribute paid by the Romans was used for the renewal of the fortress. Near the city, he founded the fortified settlement of Shahristan-i Yazdegerd (present-day ruins of Torpakh-kala), which became the main hub of the soldiers stationed in the region, whose leader held the title of "marzban of Chol". According to the New Persian chronicle Tarikh-i Yazd ("History of Yazd") of 1441, the city of Yazd in central Iran was refounded by Yazdegerd II.

== Coin mints and imperial ideology ==
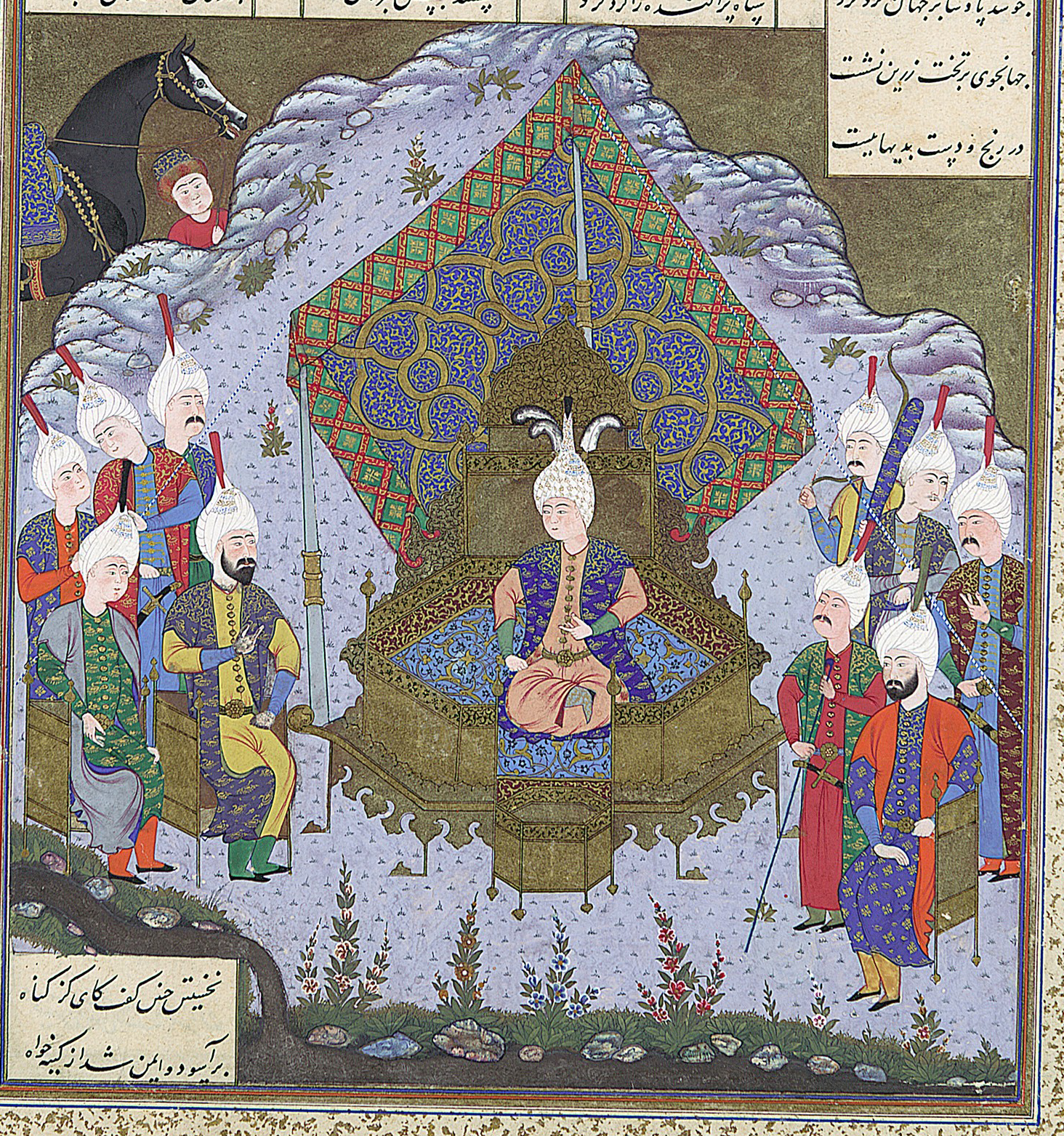
16th-century Shahnameh illustration of Yazdegerd II seated on his throne

The reign of Yazdegerd II marks the start of a new inscription on the Sasanian coins; mazdēsn bay kay ("The Mazda-worshipping majesty, the king"), which displays his fondness of the legendary Avestan dynasty, the Kayanians, who also used the title of kay. (Note: The title of kay ("king") had already been in use at least 100 years earlier by the Kushano-Sasanians, a cadet branch of the imperial Sasanian family that ruled in the East before being supplanted by the Kidarites and the imperial Sasanians in the mid 4th-century.) This is due to a shift in the political perspective of the Sasanian Empire−originally disposed towards the West, was now changed to the East. This shift, which had already started under Yazdegerd I and Bahram V, reached its zenith under Yazdegerd II and his son and successor Peroz I (r. 459–484). It may have been triggered due to the advent of hostile tribes on the eastern front of Iran. The war against the Hunnic tribes may have awakened the mythical rivalry existing between the Iranian Kayanian rulers and their Turanian enemies, which is demonstrated in the Younger Avesta. It may have thus been as a result of the conflict between Iran and its eastern enemies, that resulted in the adoption of the title of kay, used by the very same Iranian mythical kings in their war against the Turanians in the East.

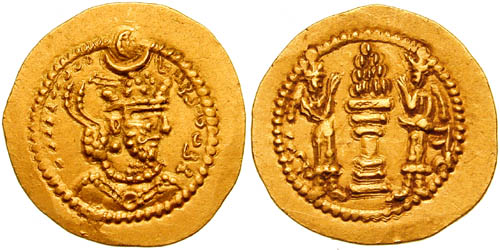
Gold dinar minted during the reign of Yazdegerd II

Likewise, it was most likely during this period that legendary and epic texts were collected by the Sasanians, including the legend of the Iranian hero-king Fereydun (Frēdōn in Middle Persian), who split up his kingdom among his three sons; his eldest son Salm receiving the empire of the West, Rome; the second eldest Tur receiving the empire of the East, Turan; and the youngest Iraj receiving the heartland of the empire, Iran. Accordingly, influenced by the texts about the Kayanians, Yazdegerd II may believed to be the heir of the Fereydun and Iraj, thus possibly deeming not only Roman domains in West as belonging to Iran, but also the eastern domains of the Huns. Thus the Sasanians may have sought to symbolically assert their rights over those lands by assuming the Kayanian title of kay. The traditional titulature of "King of Kings" was generally missing from Yazdegerd II's coinage.

A new design also appeared on the reverse of the Sasanian coins, where the traditional fire altar flanked by two attendants, now imitates them in a more venerated manner. This presumably further demonstrates Yazdegerd II's fealty to Zoroastrianism. The provinces of Asoristan and Khuzistan provided the most mints for Yazdegerd II in the west, whilst the provinces of Gurgan and Marw provided the most in the east, undoubtedly to support the Sasanians in their wars on the two fronts.

== Death and succession ==
Yazdegerd II died in 457; he had reportedly not designed a successor and instead—according to the medieval historian al-Tha'alibi—entrusted the task to the elite. Civil war soon followed; his eldest son Hormizd III ascended to the throne at the city of Ray in northern Iran, while Peroz fled to the northeastern part of the empire and began raising an army in order to claim the throne for himself. The empire thus fell into a dynastic struggle and became divided. The mother of the two brothers, Denag, temporarily ruled as regent of the empire from its capital, Ctesiphon.

== Family ==
=== Marriages ===
- Denag, an Iranian princess, possibly from the royal Sasanian family.

=== Issue ===
- Hormizd III, seventeenth shah of the Sasanian Empire (r. 457–459).
- Peroz I, eighteenth shah of the Sasanian Empire (r. 459–484).
- Zarer, Sasanian prince, who tried to claim the throne by rebelling in 485.
- Balash, nineteenth shah of the Sasanian Empire (r. 484–488).
- Vachagan III (r. 485–510), king of Caucasian Albania. His exact relation with Yazdegerd II is uncertain, he was either a son or nephew of his.
- Unnamed daughter, who married the Caucasian Albanian king Aswagen (r. 415–440).

== Sources ==
- Avdoyan, Levon (2018). "Avarayr, Battle of (Awarayr)". In Nicholson, Oliver (ed.). The Oxford Dictionary of Late Antiquity. Oxford: Oxford University Press. ISBN 978-0-19-866277-8.
- Bonner, Michael (2020). The Last Empire of Iran. New York: Gorgias Press. ISBN 978-1-4632-0616-1.
- Choksy, Jamsheed K. (2020). "Yazd: a "Good and Noble City" and an "Abode of Worship"". In Durand-Guédy, David; Mottahedeh, Roy; Paul, Jürgen (eds.). Cities of Medieval Iran. Brill. pp. 217–252. ISBN 978-90-04-43433-2.
- Daryaee, Touraj (2014). Sasanian Persia: The Rise and Fall of an Empire. I.B.Tauris. ISBN 978-0-85771-666-8.
- Daryaee, Touraj (2000). "Mehr-Narseh". Encyclopaedia Iranica.
- Daryaee, Touraj. "Yazdegerd II". Encyclopaedia Iranica.
- Frye, R. N. (1983). "The political history of Iran under the Sasanians". In Yarshater, Ehsan (ed.). The Cambridge History of Iran: The Seleucid, Parthian and Sasanian Periods. Vol. 3(1). Cambridge: Cambridge University Press. ISBN 0-521-20092-X.
- Gadjiev, Murtazali (2017). "Construction Activities of Kavād I in Caucasian Albania". Iran and the Caucasus. 21 (2). Brill: 121–131. doi:10.1163/1573384X-20170202.
- Gadjiev, Murtazali (2020a). "The Chronology of the Arsacid Albanians". In Hoyland, Robert (ed.). From Albania to Arrān: The East Caucasus between the Ancient and Islamic Worlds (ca. 330 BCE–1000 CE). Gorgias Press. pp. 29–35. ISBN 978-1-4632-3988-6.
- Gadjiev, Murtazali (2020b). "The Mission of Bishop Israyel in the Context of the Historical Geography of Caucasian Albania". In Hoyland, Robert (ed.). From Albania to Arrān: The East Caucasus between the Ancient and Islamic Worlds (ca. 330 BCE–1000 CE). Gorgias Press. pp. 101–120. ISBN 978-1-4632-3988-6.
- Gaon, Sherira (1988). The Iggeres of Rav Sherira Gaon. Translated by Nosson Dovid Rabinowich. Jerusalem: Rabbi Jacob Joseph School Press - Ahavath Torah Institute Moznaim. OCLC 923562173.
- Gyselen, Rika (1998). "Ērān-Xwarrah-Yazdgerd". Encyclopaedia Iranica, Vol. VIII, Fasc. 5. p. 537.
- Hewsen, R. (1987). "Avarayr". Encyclopaedia Iranica, Vol. III, Fasc. 1. p. 32.
- Kia, Mehrdad (2016). The Persian Empire: A Historical Encyclopedia [2 volumes]: A Historical Encyclopedia. ABC-CLIO. ISBN 978-1-61069-391-2.
- Nersessian, Vrej (2018). "Persarmenia". In Nicholson, Oliver (ed.). The Oxford Dictionary of Late Antiquity. Oxford: Oxford University Press. ISBN 978-0-19-866277-8.
- Payne, Richard E. (2015a). A State of Mixture: Christians, Zoroastrians, and Iranian Political Culture in Late Antiquity. Univ of California Press. ISBN 978-0-520-96153-1.
- Payne, Richard (2015b). "The Reinvention of Iran: The Sasanian Empire and the Huns". In Maas, Michael (ed.). The Cambridge Companion to the Age of Attila. Cambridge University Press. pp. 282–299. ISBN 978-1-107-63388-9.
- Payne, Richard (2016). "The Making of Turan: The Fall and Transformation of the Iranian East in Late Antiquity". Journal of Late Antiquity. 9 (1). Johns Hopkins University Press: 4–41. doi:10.1353/jla.2016.0011. S2CID 156673274.
- Potts, Daniel T. (2018). "Sasanian Iran and its northeastern frontier". In Mass, Michael; Di Cosmo, Nicola (eds.). Empires and Exchanges in Eurasian Late Antiquity. Cambridge University Press. doi:10.1017/9781316146040.022. ISBN 978-1-316-14604-0.
- Pourshariati, Parvaneh (2008). Decline and Fall of the Sasanian Empire: The Sasanian-Parthian Confederacy and the Arab Conquest of Iran. London and New York: I.B. Tauris. ISBN 978-1-84511-645-3.
- Rezakhani, Khodadad (2017). "East Iran in Late Antiquity". ReOrienting the Sasanians: East Iran in Late Antiquity. Edinburgh University Press. ISBN 978-1-4744-0030-5. JSTOR 10.3366/j.ctt1g04zr8. (registration required)
- Sauer, Eberhard (2017). Sasanian Persia: Between Rome and the Steppes of Eurasia. London and New York: Edinburgh University Press. ISBN 978-1-4744-0102-9.
- Schindel, Nikolaus (2013). "Sasanian Coinage". In Potts, Daniel T. (ed.). The Oxford Handbook of Ancient Iran. Oxford University Press. ISBN 978-0-19-973330-9.
- Shahbazi, A. Shapur (2003). "Yazdegerd I". Encyclopaedia Iranica.
- Shahbazi, A. Shapur (2005). "Sasanian dynasty". Encyclopaedia Iranica, Online Edition.
- Shayegan, M. Rahim (2017). "Sasanian political ideology". In Potts, Daniel T. (ed.). The Oxford Handbook of Ancient Iran. Oxford University Press. ISBN 978-0-19-066866-2.

Yazdegerd II Sasanian dynasty Died: 457
Preceded by Bahram V	King of Kings of Iran and non-Iran; 438–457	Succeeded by Hormizd III
