= Arsacid dynasty of Caucasian Albania =

Dynasty of Parthian origin (c.300-510)

Arsacid
- Dynasty
- Parent house: Arsacid dynasty of Parthia
- Country: Caucasian Albania
- Founded: c. 300
- Founder: Vachagan I
- Final ruler: Vachagan III
- Dissolution: 510

The Arsacid dynasty was a dynasty of Parthian origin, which ruled the kingdom of Caucasian Albania from the 3rd to the 6th century. They were a branch of the Arsacid dynasty of Parthia and together with the Arsacid rulers of the neighboring Armenia and Iberia formed a pan-Arsacid family federation.

== History ==
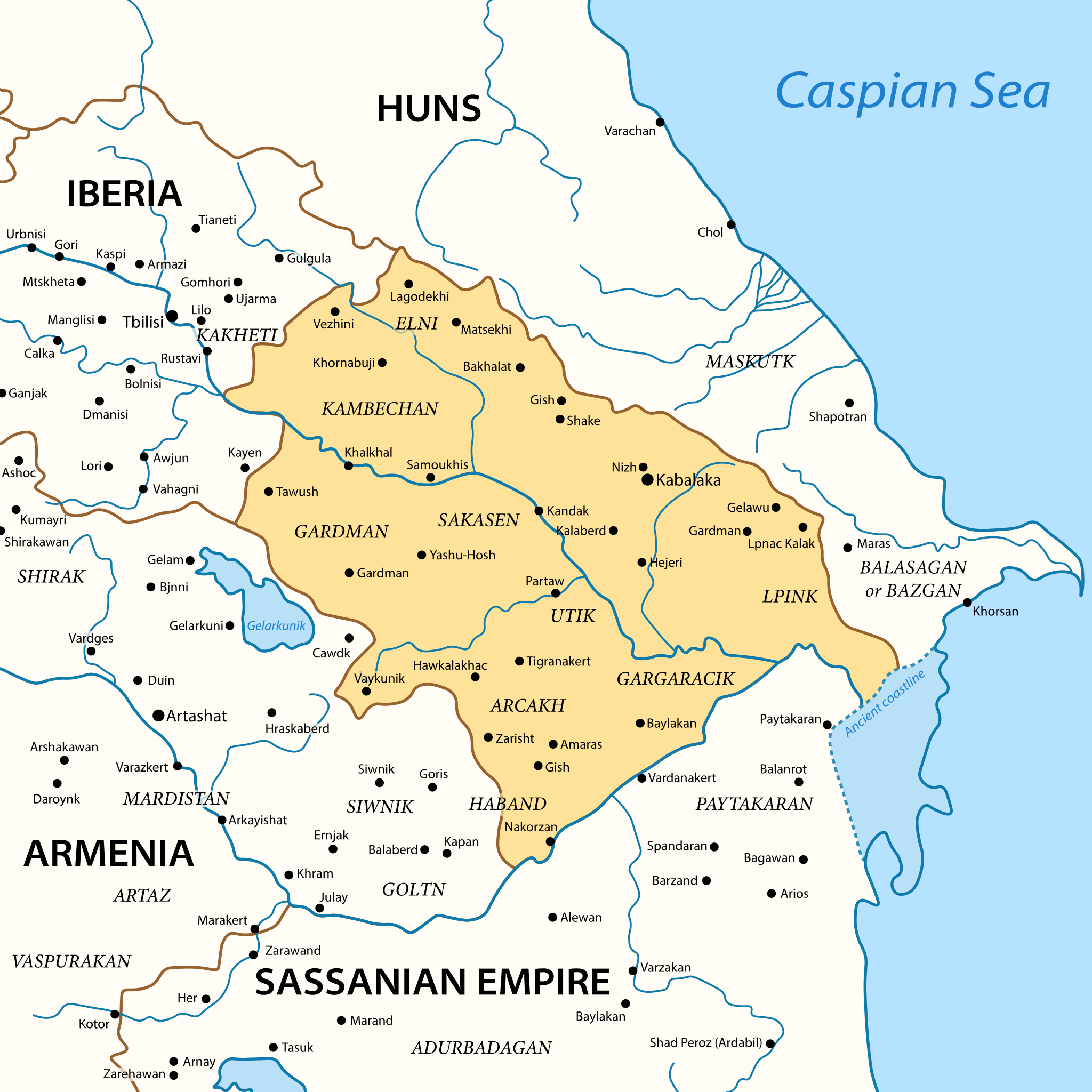
Caucasian Albania in the 5th-century

Albania first emerged as an important participant in politics by the end of the 2nd-century BC, most likely in connection to the wars between the Parthian Mithridates II (r. 124–91 BC) and the Armenian king Artavasdes I (r. 159–115 BC). The modern historian Murtazali Gadjiev argues that it was at the end of the 3rd-century that the Arsacids (a cadet branch of the Parthian Arsacids) gained the kingship of Albania, by being appointed as proxies by the Romans in order to gain complete control over the Caucasus. Their accession marked the dominance of Iranianism in the country, and the elevation of Parthian as the language of the educated.

In the 330s, the Sasanian King of Kings (shahanshah) of Iran, Shapur II (r. 309–379), forced the Albanian king Vachagan I (or Vache I) to acknowledge his suzerainty. Urnayr fought alongside Shapur II at the Battle of Bagavan in 372, where he was injured by the Armenian general Mushegh I Mamikonian, who spared him. When Urnayr returned to Albania, he sent a message to Mushegh thanking him for sparing his life, and also informed him of a surprise attack planned by Shapur II. Urnayr was succeeded by Vachagan II in c. 375. In 387, through the machinations of the Sasanians, the Armenian provinces of Artsakh, Utik, Shakashen, Gardman and Kolt were ceded to Albania. In c. 462, shahanshah Peroz I abolished Arsacid rule in Albania after suppressing a rebellion led by Vache II. Their rule was later restored in 485, when Vachagan III was installed on the throne by Peroz's brother and successor Balash (r. 484–488). A staunch Christian, Vachagan III ordered the Albanian aristocrats who had apostatized to return to their Christian beliefs. Furthermore, he also declared war against Zoroastrianism, Paganism, idolatry and witchcraft.

== Ties with Sasanian Iran ==
Starting from Urnayr, the Arsacids repeatedly married into the family of the ruling Sasanian kings of Iran; Urnayr's mother was a Sasanian princess, and he was himself married to Shapur II's daughter, with Aswagen most likely being their offspring; Vache II was the nephew of Yazdegerd II and son of an Albanian king, probably Aswagen; Vache II himself married the niece (or sister) of Peroz I; and Vachagan III was the son (or nephew) of Yazdegerd II and brother (or nephew) of Vache II. This has led Gadjiev to label the Arsacids of Albania as "Arsacid-Sasanian". This relationship strengthened Sasanian influence in Albania, increasing the importance of Middle Persian in the country.

== Arsacid kings of Caucasian Albania ==
Based on written sources, Gadjiev has deduced a list of Arsacid kings of Albania and their approximate reign.

- Vachagan the Brave, c. 300–336
- Vache I, c. 336–350
- Urnayr, c. 350–375
- Vachagan II, c. 375–385
- Merkhavan, c. 385–395
- Sato, c. 395–405
- Asay, c. 405–415
- Aswagen, c. 415–440
- Vache II, c. 440–462
- Vachagan III the Pious, c. 485–510

== Bibliography ==
=== Ancient works ===
- Faustus of Byzantium, History of the Armenians.

=== Modern works ===
- Alikberov, A.K. (2020). "Peoples and languages of Caucasian Albania: on the language continuum as an alternative for Koine". In Hoyland, Robert (ed.). From Albania to Arrān: The East Caucasus between the Ancient and Islamic Worlds (ca. 330 BCE–1000 CE). Gorgias Press. pp. 307–335. doi:10.31826/9781463239893. ISBN 978-1463239886.
- Chaumont, M. L. (1985). "Albania". Encyclopaedia Iranica, Vol. I, Fasc. 8. pp. 806–810.
- Gadjiev, Murtazali (2017). "Construction Activities of Kavād I in Caucasian Albania". Iran and the Caucasus. 21 (2). Brill: 121–131. doi:10.1163/1573384X-20170202.
- Gadjiev, Murtazali (2020). "The Chronology of the Arsacid Albanians". In Hoyland, Robert (ed.). From Albania to Arrān: The East Caucasus between the Ancient and Islamic Worlds (ca. 330 BCE–1000 CE). Gorgias Press. pp. 29–35. ISBN 978-1463239886.
- Hewsen, Robert H. (2001). Armenia: A Historical Atlas. University of Chicago Press. ISBN 978-0226332284.
- Schulze, Wolfgang (2018). "Caucasian Albanian and the Question of Language and Ethnicity". In Mumm, Peter-Arnold (ed.). Sprachen, Völker und Phantome. Gorgias Press. pp. 275–312. doi:10.1515/9783110601268-008. ISBN 9783110601268.
- Toumanoff, C. (1986). "Arsacids vii. The Arsacid dynasty of Armenia". Encyclopaedia Iranica, Vol. II, Fasc. 5. pp. 543–546.
- Zuckerman, Constantin (2020). "The Caucasus between Byzantium and the Caliphate (9th-10th c.)". In Hoyland, Robert (ed.). From Albania to Arrān: The East Caucasus between the Ancient and Islamic Worlds (ca. 330 BCE–1000 CE). Gorgias Press. pp. 149–191. doi:10.31826/9781463239893. ISBN 978-1463239886.
