= Harev (province) =

Province of the Sasanian Empire

Harev Harēw
- Province of Sasanian Empire
- ca. 230–651
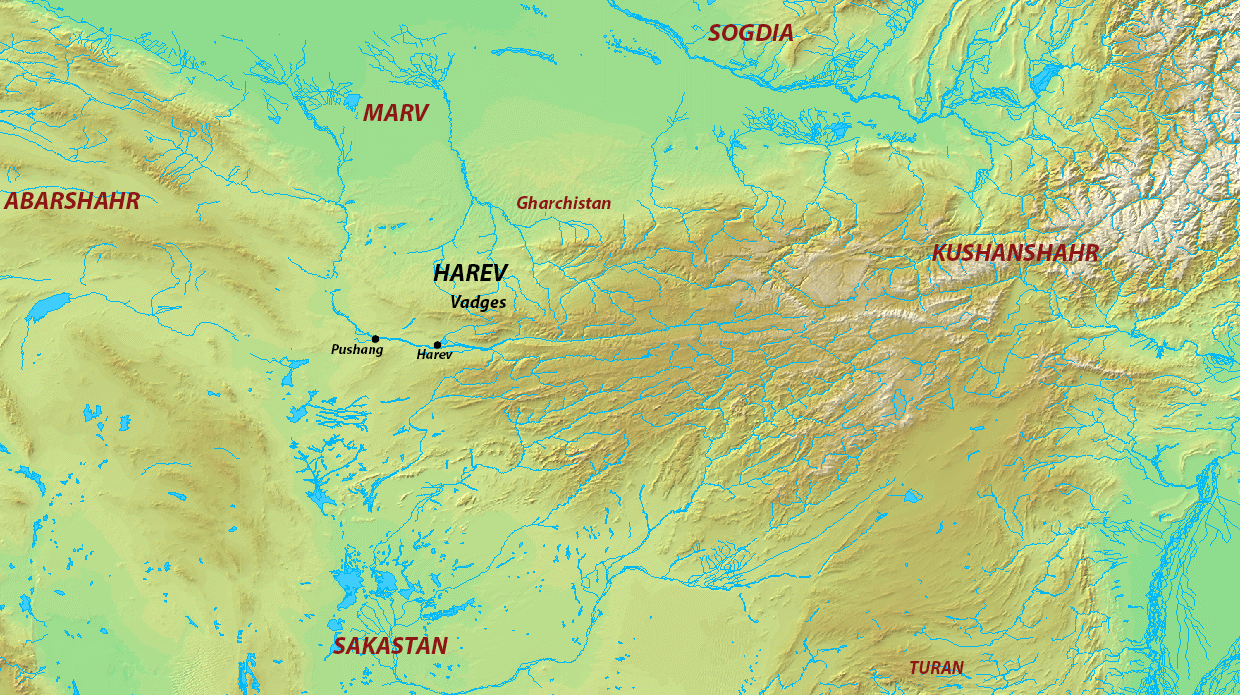
- Map of Harev and its surroundings
- Capital: Harev
- Historical era: Late Antiquity
  - Established: ca. 230
  - Annexed by Nezak Tarkhan after Yazdegerd III's death: 651
| Preceded by | Succeeded by |
| Kushan Empire | Hephthalite Empire |
- Today part of: Afghanistan; Iran; Turkmenistan

Harev (also known as Harey), was a Sasanian province in Late Antiquity, that lay within the kust of Khorasan. The province bordered Kushanshahr in the west, Abarshahr in the east, Marv in the north, and Sakastan in the south.

== Name ==
The Middle Iranian name of Harev (Middle Persian: 𐭧𐭥𐭩𐭥 Harēw, Parthian: 𐭇𐭓𐭉𐭅 Harēw, Sogdian: Harēw) is derived from Old Persian 𐏃𐎼𐎡𐎺 Haraiva.

== History ==
Harev is first mentioned in Shapur I's inscription on the Ka'ba-ye Zartosht. It was also during his reign that the town Pushang was established near the capital of Harev, which had the same name as its province, and is today known as Herat. In ca. 430, a Christian community is mentioned in the capital.

The province played a key role in the boundless wars between the Sasanians and the Xionites and Hephthalites, a nomadic people who had settled in Transoxiana and Tokharistan in the late 4th century. During the reign of Peroz I (r. 459–484), a group of Armenian nobles were settled in Harev by his foster brother Izad Gushnasp. In 484, Peroz I was defeated and killed by a Hephthalite army under Khushnavaz, who thereafter conquered Harev. The province remained in Hephthalite hands until Kavadh I (r. 488–496 & 498–531) reconquered the province during the early part of his second reign. During the reign of his son and successor Khosrow I (r. 531-579), the province became part of the kust of Khorasan.

In 588, during the reign of Hormizd IV (r. 579–590), Nestorian bishops from Harev went to the Sasanian capital Ctesiphon to be present at the synod of Ishoyahb I. In the same year, Harev was briefly occupied by the Göktürk ruler Bagha Qaghan (known as Sava/Saba in medieval Iranian sources). He was, however, defeated and killed by Hormizd IV's military commander Bahram Chobin. After the death of the last Sasanian king Yazdegerd III (r. 632–651) in 651, the province was annexed by the Hephthalite ruler of Badghis, Nezak Tarkhan. One year later, the province was conquered by the Arabs.

== Coin minting ==
Harev served as a coin minting workshop; several gold and copper coins have been found in its capital, which are clearly from the Sasanian era. Although the Sasanians did not normally mint gold coins, Harev was an exception. The gold coins show a portrait of the ruler on one side, while a fire altar on the other. Some names of the governors on the coins have a close resemblance to the names of the Indo-Sasanians, which suggests that the Indo-Sasanian governor also had control over Harev at times.

== See also ==
- Aria (region)

== Sources ==
- Greatrex, Geoffrey; Lieu, Samuel N. C. (2002). The Roman Eastern Frontier and the Persian Wars (Part II, 363–630 AD). New York, New York and London, United Kingdom: Routledge (Taylor & Francis). ISBN 0-415-14687-9.
- Pourshariati, Parvaneh (2008). Decline and Fall of the Sasanian Empire: The Sasanian-Parthian Confederacy and the Arab Conquest of Iran. London and New York: I.B. Tauris. ISBN 978-1-84511-645-3.
- Zarrinkub, Abd al-Husain (1975). "The Arab conquest of Iran and its aftermath". The Cambridge History of Iran, Volume 4: From the Arab Invasion to the Saljuqs. Cambridge: Cambridge University Press. pp. 1–57. ISBN 978-0-521-20093-6.
- Morony, M. (1986). "ʿARAB ii. Arab conquest of Iran". Encyclopaedia Iranica, Vol. II, Fasc. 2. pp. 203–210.
- Vogelsang, W. J. (2003). "HERAT ii. HISTORY, PRE-ISLAMIC PERIOD". Encyclopaedia Iranica, Vol. XII, Fasc. 2. pp. 205–206.
- Schindel, Nikolaus (2013). "KAWĀD I i. Reign". Encyclopaedia Iranica, Vol. XVI, Fasc. 2. pp. 136–141.
- Fisher, William Bayne; Yarshater, Ehsan (1983). The Cambridge History of Iran: The Seleucid, Parthian and Sasanian periods. Cambridge University Press. ISBN 978-0-521-24693-4.
- Bosworth, C. Edmund (2000). "FŪŠANJ". Encyclopaedia Iranica, Vol. X, Fasc. 3. London u.a. pp. 229–230.
- Bosworth, C. Edmund (2007). Historic Cities of the Islamic World. BRILL. pp. 1–615. ISBN 9789004153882.
- Potts, Daniel T. (2014). Nomadism in Iran: From Antiquity to the Modern Era. London and New York: Oxford University Press. pp. 1–558. ISBN 9780199330799.
