= Vache II of Albania =

Vache II

King of Caucasian Albania
- Reign: 440–462
- Predecessor: Aswagen
- Successor: Vachagan III
- Spouse: Niece or sister of Peroz I
- House: Arsacid
- Father: Aswagen
- Mother: Unnamed sister of Yazdegerd II
- Religion: Church of Caucasian Albania; Zoroastrianism

Vache II was the ninth Arsacid king of Caucasian Albania from approximately 440 to 462. He was the son and successor of Aswagen (r. 415–440). His mother was a daughter of the Sasanian king Yazdegerd II (r. 438–457), and he was himself married to the niece or sister of Peroz I (r. 459–484).

During the dynastic struggle between the brothers Peroz and Hormizd III in 457–459, Vache II took advantage of the tumultuous situation and declared independence. He denounced Zoroastrianism (which he had originally converted to) and reverted to Christianity. He opened the gates of Derbent for the Huns, and with their aid, attacked the Sasanian army. Peroz responded by opening the Darial Gorge for the Huns, who subsequently ravaged Albania. The two kings soon entered into negotiations and reached an accord: Vache II would return his mother (Peroz's sister) and daughter to Peroz, while he would in exchange receive the 1,000 families he had originally been given by his father as his share of the inheritance. Vache II thereafter abdicated, leaving Albania kingless for a few decades, until Vachagan III (r. 485–510) was installed on the throne by Peroz's brother and successor Balash (r. 484–488).

According to The History of the Country of Albania, Peroz had during his reign ordered Vache to have the city of Perozapat ("the city of Peroz" or "Prosperous Peroz") constructed. However, this is unlikely, as the Kingdom of Albania had been abolished by Peroz after suppressing Vache II's revolt. The city was seemingly founded by Peroz himself after the removal of the ruling family in Albania.

== Sources ==
- Chaumont, M. L. (1985). "Albania". Encyclopaedia Iranica, Vol. I, Fasc. 8. pp. 806–810.
- Chaumont, M. L.; Schippmann, K. (1988). "Balāš". Encyclopaedia Iranica, Vol. III, Fasc. 6. pp. 574–580.
- Gadjiev, Murtazali (2017). "Construction Activities of Kavād I in Caucasian Albania". Iran and the Caucasus. 21 (2). Brill: 121–131. doi:10.1163/1573384X-20170202.
- Gadjiev, Murtazali (2020). "The Chronology of the Arsacid Albanians". In Hoyland, Robert (ed.). From Albania to Arrān: The East Caucasus between the Ancient and Islamic Worlds (ca. 330 BCE–1000 CE). Gorgias Press. pp. 29–35. ISBN 978-1463239886.
- Schippmann, Klaus (1999). "Fīrūz". Encyclopaedia Iranica, Vol. IX, Fasc. 6. pp. 631–632.

Preceded by Aswagen	King of Caucasian Albania; 440–462	Succeeded by Vachagan III
