= House of Varaz =

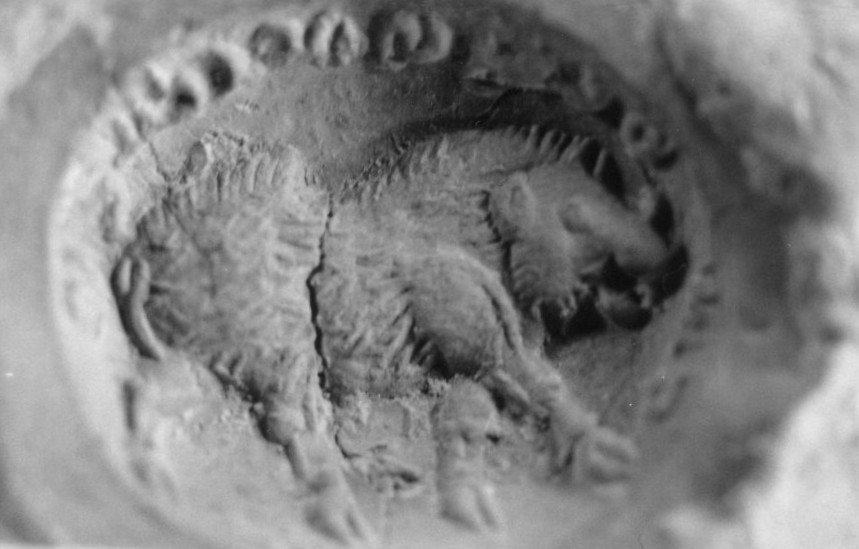
Sasanian-era bulla of a boar, under the name of "Farrokh Peroz i Waraz" or "Peroz i Waraz, blessed".

The House of Varaz (or Waraz) was one of the great families in the Sasanian Empire. The family appears in third century Sasanian inscriptions: Dehen i Varaz at the court of Ardashir I (r. 224–242), Ardashir i Varaz at the court of Shapur I (r. 240–270) and Hormizd i Varaz at the court of Bahram II (r. 274–293). Secondary sources do not mention the Varaz family. This omission is likely due to the persistent confusion between titles, names, and designations in the Sasanian era. Additionally, Varaz is the literal word for a boar, and also exists as part of titles, which adds to the confusion. A certain Shapur-Varaz who was the marzban (margrave) of Adurbadagan may have belonged to the Varaz family.

Seal inscriptions record instances of Varaz serving as a personal name, a father's name, and seemingly a family name. A bulla is inscribed under the name of a certain Farrokh Peroz or Peroz, who is designated as a Varaz. The bulla depicts a boar, perhaps chosen by the owner as a reference to his name.

== Sources ==
- Gyselen, Rika (2008). Kennet, Derek; Luft, Paul (eds.). Current Research in Sasanian Archaeology, Art and History Proceedings of a Conference held at Durham University, November 3rd and 4th, 2001. British Archaeological Reports. ISBN 978-1407302997.
