= Vachagan III =

King of Caucasian Albania
- Reign: 485–523
- Predecessor: Vache II
- Spouse: Shushanik
- Issue: Pantaleon; Khanchik
- House: Arsacid
- Father: Aswagen or Yazdegerd II
- Religion: Church of Caucasian Albania

Vachagan III the Pious (Old Armenian: Վաչագան Բարեպաշտ, romanized: Vačʿagan Barepašt) or Vachagan II (according to some authors) was the last Arsacid king of Caucasian Albania, ruling approximately from 485 to 523.

== Background ==
His lineage is uncertain. Murtazali Gadjiev considers him a son (or nephew) of the King of Kings (shahanshah) Yazdegerd II (r. 438–457) and brother (or nephew) of Vache II. However, Aleksan Hakobyan refers to 5th century Armenian historian Elishe's mention of Vache as "a son inherited families", concluding that Vache was not heir but a second son. Hence, according to him, Vachagan was the son of elder but deceased son of Aswagen, thus a nephew of Vache II.

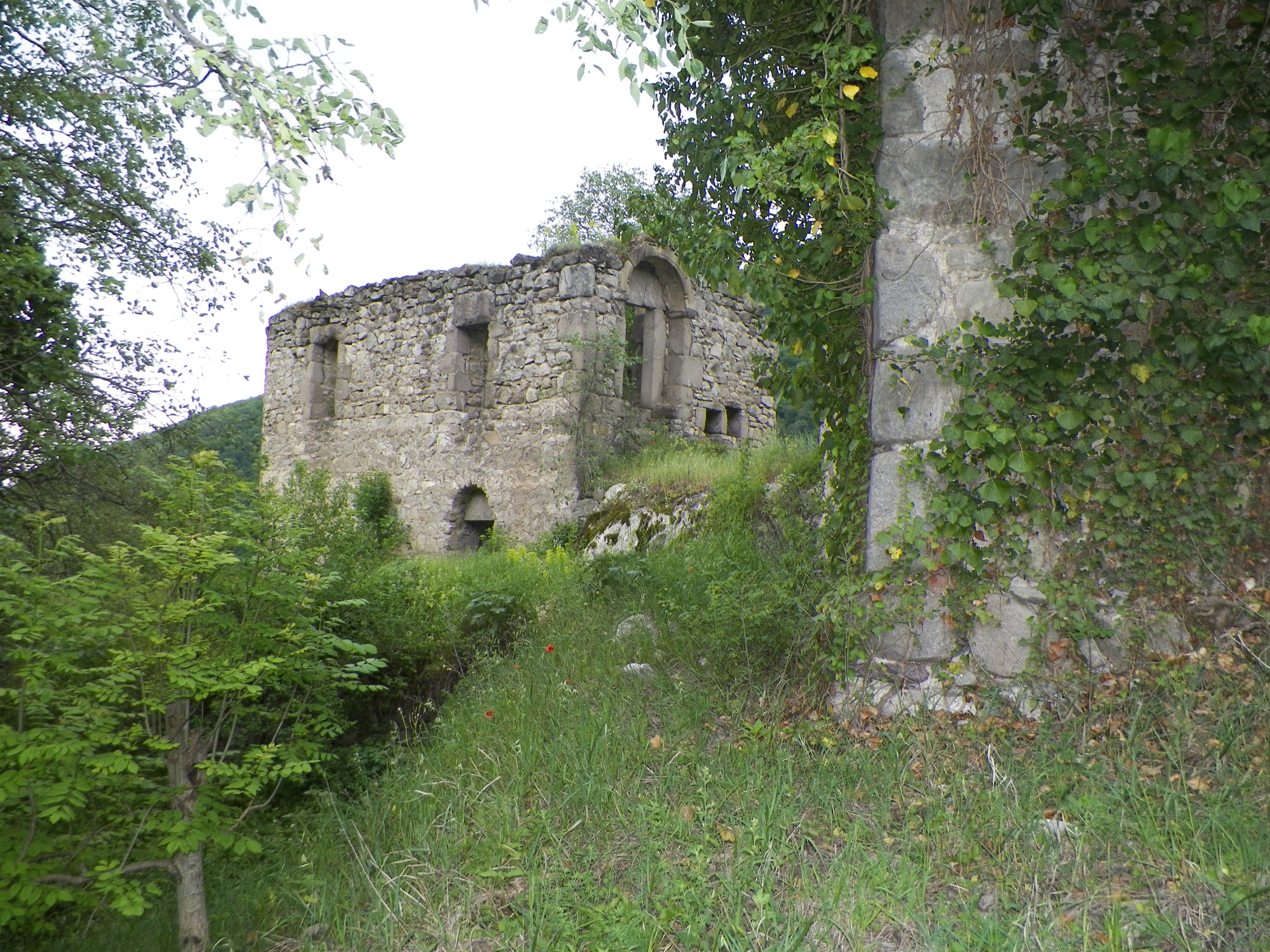
The Yeghishe Arakyal Monastery, where Vachagan III is buried

== Reign ==
Vache II previously ruled Caucasian Albania as a Sasanian vassal, but had been forced to abdicate after his revolt was crushed by Yazdegerd II's son and successor Peroz I (r. 457–484) in 462. Albania would remain kingless until 485, when Vachagan III was installed on the throne by Peroz's brother and successor Balash (r. 484–488). This happened around the time of the signing of the Treaty of Nvarsak. The 6th-century Syriac author Zacharias Rhetor reports the siege of the Byzantine city of Amida by the Sasanian forces. After the city was captured in January 503, the victors started plundering the city and capturing prisoners. While this took place, mention is made of a "Christian prince of the country of Aran pleaded with the (Persian) king on behalf of one church, called the Church of the Forty Martyrs, and he spared it while it was full of people." Modern historian Murtazali Gadjiev deduces that the Christian prince described is "without a doubt" Vachagan III. Although sources don't give date for end of Vachagan's reign, Hakobyan puts it into 523, about the time of Kavad I's invasion of Georgia and abolishment of Iberian monarchy.

== Family ==
The History of the Country of Albania names two children of Vachagan—a son, Pantaleon, named after Saint Pantaleon, and a daughter named Khanchik. His wife, named Shushanik (Old Armenian: Շուշանիկ) was probably a Mamikonian princess.

== Legend ==
Vachagan is presented in The History of the Country of Albania as a staunch Christian who ordered the Albanian aristocrats who had apostatized to return to their Christian beliefs. Furthermore, he also declared war against Zoroastrianism, paganism, idolatry and witchcraft. He opened religious schools in the country and recovered the Grigoris' and Saint Pantaleon's relics and buried them in a tomb within the Amaras Monastery with help of his uncle Khochkorik. Hakobyan considers chapter on Vachagan's life as a tale and an image of the ideal and the good Christian ruler. He is traditionally assumed to be buried in Yeghishe Arakyal Monastery.

== Legacy ==
Vachagan's rule in Albania was characterized by gradual Armenianization of the country, relying on Armenian feudals. Hakobyan believes this is when Armenians came to consider Albania as an Armenian realm too. Later princely houses in the region, such as the Aranshahiks (authors such as Patrick Donabédian and Bagrat Ulubabyan are supporters of this theory) and the Hasan-Jalalyans claimed descent from him. Vachagan has become a symbol of renewal in Nagorno-Karabakh; there is a state "Order of Vachagan the Pious" in the Nagorno-Karabakh Republic. The Armenian tale Anahit and Vachagan is loosely based on Vachagan's life. The tale was retold as romantic prose by Ghazaros Aghayan (adapted into the film Anahit in 1947) and as a children's story by Robert San Souci.

Vachagan was depicted on the coat of arms of Stepanakert from 2012 until it fell to Azerbaijani control in 2023.

== Sources ==
- Chaumont, M. L. (1985). "Albania". In Yarshater, Ehsan (ed.). Encyclopædia Iranica. Vol. I/8: Alafrank–Alp Arslan. London and New York: Routledge & Kegan Paul. pp. 806–810. ISBN 978-0-71009-097-3.
- Chaumont, M. L.; Schippmann, K. (1988). "Balāš". In Yarshater, Ehsan (ed.). Encyclopædia Iranica. Vol. III/6: Baḵtīārī tribe II–Banān. London and New York: Routledge & Kegan Paul. pp. 574–580. ISBN 978-0-71009-118-5.
- Gadjiev, Murtazali (2017). "Construction Activities of Kavād I in Caucasian Albania". Iran and the Caucasus. 21 (2). Brill: 121–131. doi:10.1163/1573384X-20170202.
- Gadjiev, Murtazali (2020). "The Chronology of the Arsacid Albanians". In Hoyland, Robert (ed.). From Albania to Arrān: The East Caucasus between the Ancient and Islamic Worlds (ca. 330 BCE–1000 CE). Gorgias Press. pp. 29–35.
- Schippmann, Klaus (1999). "Fīrūz". In Yarshater, Ehsan (ed.). Encyclopædia Iranica. Vol. IX/6: Festivals VIII–Fish. London and New York: Routledge & Kegan Paul. pp. 631–632. ISBN 978-0-933273-34-4.
