= Shirin of Bavand =

Ruler of Bavand
- Predecessor: ّFakhr ad-din Deylami
- Died: Rey, Iran
- House: Bavand
- Father: Rostam ebn Shervin

Shirin of Bavand or Om-e Rostam (meaning mother of Rostam) was the first female monarch of Iran after the Muslim conquest of Persia. She was ruling Rey, Iran, Mazandaran Province, Gilan Province, Hamadan and Isfahan.

When Mahmud of Ghazni sent an ambassador to her to ask her to surrender, she answered:

When my husband was alive, always I was afraid of your attack, but now I don't fear any more because if you attack and I kill you, historians write a woman killed Mahmud and if you kill me, they write Mahmud killed a woman.

Her smart answer changed Mahmud's decision for the attack and he did not attack Rey util the end of his life.

She died at the age of 80.

== See also ==
- Diang of Persia
