= Khwarasan =

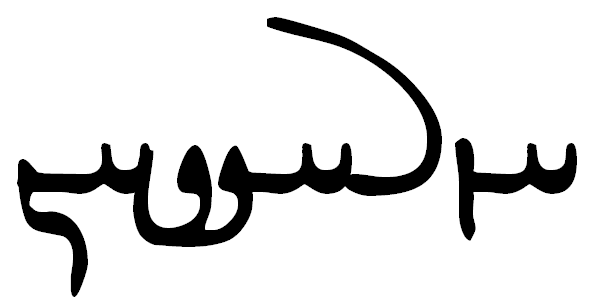
Khwarāsān ( ) was one of the four kusts (frontier regions) of the Sasanian Empire, formed during the reign of king Khosrow I (r. 531–579). Khwarasan was commanded by a spahbed from one of the seven Parthian clans. The appointed spahbed of the kust was given the title of aspbed.

The name Khwarasan is a combination of khwar (meaning "sun") and āsān (from āyān, literally meaning "to come" or "coming" or "about to come").

== See also ==
- Greater Khorasan

== Sources ==
- James Howard-Johnston, ‘The Late Sasanian Army’. In: Bernheimer, T. – Silverstein, A. (eds.), Late Antiquity: Eastern perspectives, Exeter 2012, pp. 87–127.
- Pourshariati, Parvaneh (2008). Decline and Fall of the Sasanian Empire: The Sasanian-Parthian Confederacy and the Arab Conquest of Iran. London and New York: I.B. Tauris. ISBN 978-1-84511-645-3.
- Gyselen, Rika (20 July 2004). "SPĀHBED". Encyclopaedia Iranica, Online Edition.
