= Shapur Sakanshah =

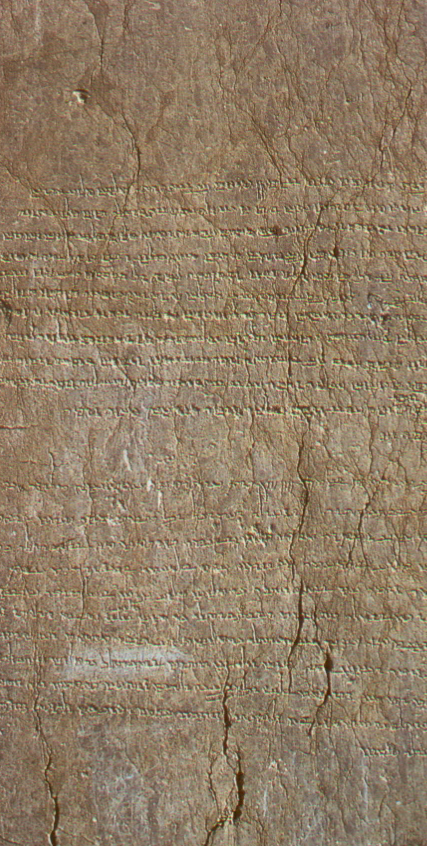
The inscription of Shapur Sakanshah at the Tachara, the former palace of Darius the Great.

Shapur "Sakanshah" was a Sasanian prince who served as the governor of Sakastan under his brother king (shah) Shapur II (r. 309–379).

== Biography ==
Shapur served as the governor of Sakastan–a province far away from the imperial court in Ctesiphon, and had since its conquest by Ardashir I (r. 224–240), served as a difficult area for the Sasanians to maintain control over. As a result, the province had since its early days functioned as a form of vassal kingdom, ruled by princes from the Sasanian family, who held the title of sakanshah ("king of the Saka"). Although native Sakastani soldiers had helped Shapur II in his wars against the Romans, they were probably mercenaries, and the province still remained relatively decentralized. In 311, while Shapur was travelling from Sakastan to Istakhr, a city in Pars, he stopped at the ruins of the ancient Achaemenid capital of Persepolis, and had an inscription carved at the Tachara, the former palace of Darius the Great.

== Sources ==
- Bosworth, Clifford Edmund (1997). "Sīstān". The Encyclopedia of Islam, New Edition, Volume IX: San–Sze. Leiden, and New York: BRILL. pp. 681–685. ISBN 9789004082656.
- Christensen, Peter (1993). The Decline of Iranshahr: Irrigation and Environments in the History of the Middle East, 500 B.C. to A.D. 1500. Museum Tusculanum Press. pp. 1–351. ISBN 9788772892597.
- Gazerani, Saghi (2015). The Sistani Cycle of Epics and Iran's National History: On the Margins of Historiography. BRILL. pp. 1–250. ISBN 9789004282964.
- Wiesehöfer, Josef (2001). Ancient Persia. Translated by Azodi, Azizeh. I.B. Tauris. ISBN 978-1-86064-675-1.
