= Zik (general) =

Zik (𐭉𐭆𐭀𐭊 zy’k *Zīg; Greek: Ζικ or Ζιχ Zik or Zikh) or in Greek sources also Zecas (Greek: Ζηκας), was a 4th-century Iranian officer active during the reign of the Sasanian king (shah) Shapur II (r. 309–379). He was a member of the House of Zik, one of the Seven Great Houses of Iran. Not much is known about him; he was in c. 367 along with Karen given a large army to rule over Armenia, which had recently been seized by the Iranian army. "The Zik" is mentioned in Part Six, Section One of the Buzandaran Patmutʻiwnkʻ attributed to Faustus of Byzantium: King Arshak I of Armenia "gave his deputy the Zik as a mentor to King Khosrow I."

== Sources ==
- Daryaee, Touraj (2009). "SHAPUR II". Encyclopaedia Iranica.
- Garsoïan, Nina G. (1989). The Epic Histories Attributed to Pʿawstos Buzand. (Buzandaran Patmutʿiwnkʿ). Translation and Commentary by Nina G. Garsoïan. Cambridge, MA: Harvard University Press.
- Justi, Ferdinand (1895). Iranisches Namenbuch. Marburg: N. G. Elwertsche Verlagsbuchhandlung.
- Patkanjan, Kʰ (1987). Pʰawstosi Biwzandanat͡sʰwoj Patmowtʰiwn Hajot͡sʰ (in Armenian). Yerevan: Yerevan State University.
