= Aswagen =

King of Caucasian Albania
- Reign: 415–440
- Predecessor: Asay
- Successor: Vache II
- Spouse: Unnamed daughter of Yazdegerd II
- Issue: Vache II; Vachagan III (?)
- House: Arsacid
- Father: Urnayr
- Mother: Daughter of Shapur II
- Religion: Church of Caucasian Albania

Aswagen (also spelled Arsvaghen and Aswahen) was the eight Arsacid king of Caucasian Albania, ruling from approximately 415 to 440. He was most likely the son of the previous Albanian king Urnayr, while his mother was a daughter of the Sasanian King of Kings (shahanshah) of Iran, Shapur II (r. 309–379). Aswagen was himself married to a daughter of shahanshah Yazdegerd II (r. 438–457). It was under Aswagen that the Caucasian Albanian script was created in c. 420.

Aswagen is mentioned in a Middle Persian seal, whose inscription reads: Āhzwahēn i, Ārān šāh ("Āhzwahēn, King of Aran (Albania)"). The seal is one of the three known unique aristocratic Albanian gem-seals that were crafted between the end of the 4th-century and the start of the 6th-century. Furthermore, it is also important for the cultural and political connections between Sasanian Iran and Albania, as well as the role of Middle Persian in Albania. The seal depicts a "Moon chariot" monogram, which may have been his royal emblem, and also possibly used by the rest of the Arsacid kings of Albania. An identical symbol is depicted on Sasanian gems, as well as Kushan-Sasanian, Chionite, Alkhan, Nezak and Hephthalite coins. The Dagestani historian Murtazali Gadjiev suggests that the monogram was a symbol of their blood ties with the Sasanians, and therefore lineage from the gods.

Aswagen was succeeded by Vache II, who was most likely his son. The later Albanian king Vachagan III may have also been Aswagen's son.

== Sources ==
- Chaumont, M. L. (1985). "Albania". Encyclopaedia Iranica, Vol. I, Fasc. 8. pp. 806–810.
- Gadjiev, Murtazali (2020). "The Chronology of the Arsacid Albanians". In Hoyland, Robert (ed.). From Albania to Arrān: The East Caucasus between the Ancient and Islamic Worlds (ca. 330 BCE–1000 CE). Gorgias Press. pp. 29–35. ISBN 978-1463239886.
- Gadjiev, Murtazali (2021). "The role and place of Middle Persian language and writing in Caucasian Albania". Vostok (Oriens): 59–70.

Preceded by Asay	King of Caucasian Albania; 415–440	Succeeded by Vache II
