= Byzantine–Sasanian War of 440 =

Inconclusive short border war

- Part of the Byzantine–Sasanian Wars
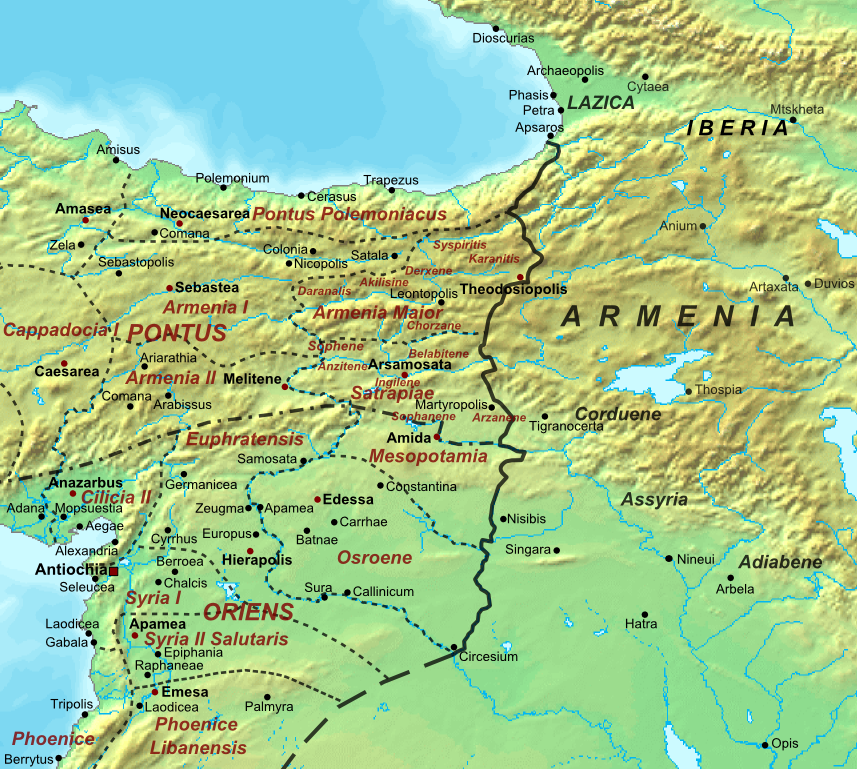
- Byzantine - Sasanian frontier
Date	440
Location	The Near East
Result	Inconclusive

Belligerents
Eastern Roman Empire	Sasanian Empire

Commanders and leaders
Theodosius II	Yazdegerd II

The East Roman–Sasanian War of 440 was a short conflict between the Eastern Roman Empire and the Sasanian Empire. The invasion of the southern Roman provinces by the Vandals forced the East Romans to sue for a quick end to the war to focus on the Vandal invasion. The Romans agreed to pay their share for border defences.

== History ==
Since their peace treaty in 387, the Sasanian and Roman Empires had agreed that they were both obligated to cooperate in the defense of the Caucasus against nomadic attacks. The Romans helped in the defense of the Caucasus by paying the Iranians roughly 500 lbs (226 kg) of gold at irregular intervals. While the Romans saw this payment as political subsidies, the Iranians saw it as an opportunity to influence Roman military affairs. The Roman emperor Theodosius II's unwillingness to continue the payment made shah Yazdegerd II declare war against the Romans, which had ultimately little success for either side.

The Romans were invaded in their southern provinces by the Vandals, causing Theodosius II to ask for peace and send his commander, Anatolius, personally to Yazdegerd II's camp. In the ensuing negotiations in 440, both empires promised not to build any new fortifications in Mesopotamia and that the Sasanian Empire would get some payment in order to protect the Caucasus from incursions.

== Sources ==
- Daryaee, Touraj. "Yazdegerd II". Encyclopaedia Iranica.
- Frye, R. N. (1983). "The political history of Iran under the Sasanians". In Yarshater, Ehsan (ed.). The Cambridge History of Iran: The Seleucid, Parthian and Sasanian Periods. Vol. 3(1). Cambridge: Cambridge University Press. ISBN 0-521-20092-X.
- Payne, Richard (2015). "The Reinvention of Iran: The Sasanian Empire and the Huns". In Maas, Michael (ed.). The Cambridge Companion to the Age of Attila. Cambridge University Press. pp. 282–299. ISBN 978-1-107-63388-9.
- Shayegan, M. Rahim (2017). "Sasanian political ideology". In Potts, Daniel T. (ed.). The Oxford Handbook of Ancient Iran. Oxford University Press. pp. 1–1021. ISBN 9780190668662.
