= Battle of Bagavan =

371 battle of the Roman-Persian Wars

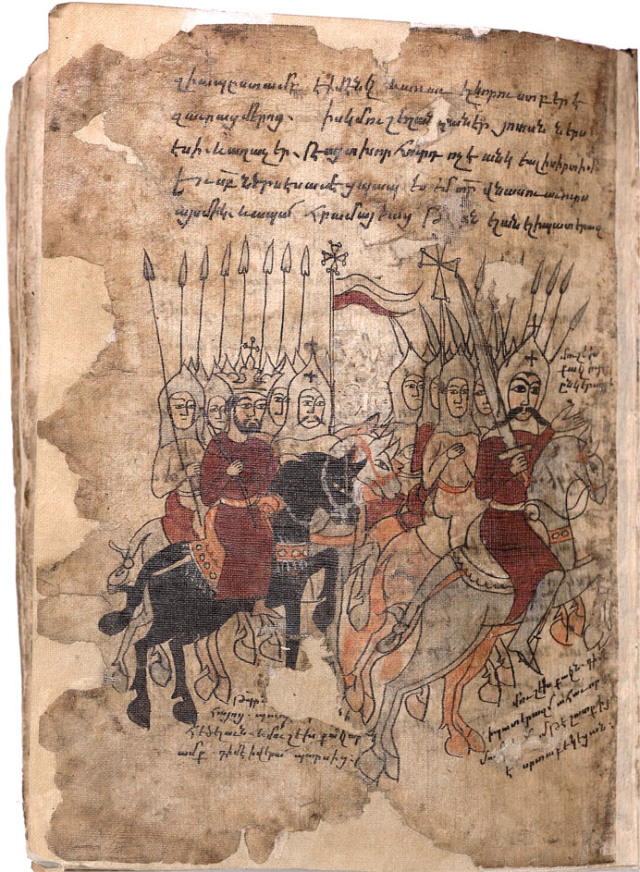
- 16th-century Armenian miniature depicting the battle
Date	371
Location	near Bagavan, Bagrevand, Greater Armenia 39.6083°N 43.4769°E
Result	Roman-Armenian victory

Belligerents
Sasanian Empire; Caucasian Albania	Kingdom of Armenia; Roman Empire

Commanders and leaders
Urnayr (WIA); Meruzhan Artsruni (executed)	Traianus; Vadomarius; Mushegh I Mamikonian

The Battle of Bagavan (also spelled Bagawan), Battle of Dzirav (Armenian: Ձիրավի ճակատամարտ, romanized: Dziravi chakatamart) or the Battle of Vagabanta was fought in 371 near the settlement of Bagavan, in the district of Bagrevand in Greater Armenia, between a joint Roman-Armenian force and a Sasanian army, with the Romans and Armenians emerging victorious. It is recorded by the Roman historian Ammianus Marcellinus, as well as the Armenian historian Faustus of Byzantium.

The Armenian historian Movses Khorenatsi and several later Armenian historians following him place the battle in a field called Dzirav, and so the battle is called the Battle of Dzirav in some Armenian sources. In the view of historians Hakob Manandian and Nina Garsoïan, this is an error by Khorenatsi or a conflation of the Battle of Bagavan with the battle at Gandzak described in the next chapter of Faustus's history.

== Background ==
In the aftermath of the Perso-Roman peace treaty of 363, whereby Rome had pledged not to intervene in Armenian affairs, Armenia was left at the mercy of the Sasanian king Shapur II, who in 367/368 imprisoned the Armenian king Arshak II and strove to consolidate Persian rule in the country. In 369, the Roman emperor Valens allowed Pap, son of Arshak II, to return to Armenia accompanied by the general Terentius. However, Pap was soon driven out of Armenia by Shapur's armies and forced to hide in Lazica. While Pap was in hiding, Shapur contacted him and persuaded him to change his allegiance to Persia, but this attempted rapprochement was aborted when Valens's general Arintheus arrived and restored Pap to the Armenian throne a second time.

Shapur was enraged by this move, but did not declare the peace with Rome void until the winter of 370. Shapur amassed an army, which, according to Faustus, included the forces of his ally King Urnayr of Albania, and invaded Armenia in the spring of 371. Valens sent a large army to Armenia under the command of generals Traianus and Vadomarius, but with orders to engage only in defensive actions, hoping to maintain the peace with Persia. The Armenians also assembled their army under the command of sparapet (general-in-chief) Mushegh Mamikonian and convened with the Romans near the settlement of Bagavan, in the district of Bagrevand, at the foot of Mount Npat, near the source of the Arsanias River. Faustus gives the number of the Armenian army as 90,000.

== Battle ==
The combined Armenian-Roman army met the invading Sasanian force near Bagavan. According to Ammianus Marcellinus, the Romans initially withdrew to avoid combat, but were eventually forced to respond to the attacks of the Persian cavalry and won a decisive victory in the subsequent battle, inflicting heavy casualties on the Persians. Faustus of Byzantium gives considerable credit for the victory to sparapet Mushegh Mamikonian. Faustus also tells of how Urnayr of Albania asked Shapuh to let his contingent face the Armenian force, and how Mushegh engaged in single combat with Urnayr and wounded the Albanian king, but allowed him to escape with his life. This may indicate that the battle took place in a similar fashion as other battles where the Romans and their allies faced the Persians and their allies, with the Romans facing the Persians and the allies fighting each other. According to Faustus, King Pap did not take part in the battle and observed from Mount Npat together with Patriach Nerses at the request of the Roman generals.

== Aftermath ==
Ammianus writes that several other engagements were fought after the Armenian-Roman victory at Bagavan, with varying outcomes. Faustus tells of another great battle at Gandzak in Adurbadagan where the Armenians and Romans routed the Persians again, this time with Shapur there in person. After these battles, Shapur sent envoys and a truce was agreed upon. Shapur then returned to Ctesiphon and Valens to Antioch, with Armenia left effectively under Roman suzerainty. The truce would last for seven years. As a result of these victories, Mushegh is said to have reconquered many lost Armenian territories and forced the nobles who had revolted against the Arsacid monarchy to submit to Pap's authority. (Note: The extent of the reconquest of Armenian territories by Mushegh is not certain and likely exaggerated by Faustus. Faustus names the following territories among those recaptured by Mushegh: part of Atrpatakan, Noshirakan, Kordukʻ (Corduene), Kordikʻ, Tmorikʻ, "the land of the Markʻ (Medes)", Artsʻakh, Utikʻ, Shakashēn, Gardmanadzor, Koghtʻ, Kasp (Pʻaytakaran), Gugarkʻ, Aghdznikʻ (Arzanene), Mets Tsopʻkʻ (Greater Sophene), Angeghtun, and Andzitʻ. Manandian rules out the reconquest of Arzanene and Corduene (which had been ceded to Persia by Rome in 363), as well as the capture of Greater Sophene, Angeghtun (Ingilene) and Andzitʻ (Anzitene), which had been annexed by Rome. Chaumont considers the reconquest of territories from Albania (Artsʻakh, Utikʻ, Shakashēn, Gardman, Koghtʻ) to be unlikely.)

== Bibliography ==
=== Ancient works ===
- Ammianus Marcellinus, Res Gestae.
- P'awstos Buzand (1985). History of the Armenians. Translated by Bedrosian, Robert. New York.

=== Modern works ===
- Chaumont, M. L. (1985). "Albania". Encyclopaedia Iranica, Vol. I, Fasc. 8. pp. 806–810.
- Chaumont, M. L. (1986). "Armenia and Iran ii. The pre-Islamic period". Encyclopaedia Iranica, Vol. II, Fasc. 4. pp. 418–438.
- Garsoian, Nina (2000). "Mamikonean family". Encyclopaedia Iranica.
- Garsoïan, Nina G. (1989). The Epic Histories Attributed to Pʻawstos Buzand (Buzandaran Patmutʻiwnkʻ). Cambridge, Massachusetts: Harvard University Press. ISBN 0-674-25865-7.
- Grousset, René (1947). Histoire de l'Arménie des origines à 1071. Paris.
- Hughes, Ian (2013). Imperial Brothers: Valentinian, Valens and the Disaster at Adrianople. Pen & Sword. ISBN 978-1848844179.
- Lenski, Noel Emmanuel (2002). Failure of Empire: Valens and the Roman state in the fourth century A.D. University of California Press. ISBN 978-0-520-23332-4.
- Manandyan, Hakob (1957). Kʻnnakan tesutʻyun hay zhoghovrdi patmutʻyan, hator B, masn A [Critical theory of the history of the Armenian people, volume II, part I] (in Armenian). Erevan: Haypethrat.
