= Eran-Khwarrah-Yazdegerd =

Short-lived province of the Sasanian Empire

Eran-Khwarrah-Yazdegerd (meaning "Iran, glory of Yazdegerd") was a short-lived province of the Sasanian Empire located in the northern part of the Gorgan province. The province was founded by shah Yazdegerd II (r. 438-457).

== See also ==
- Khorasan

== Sources ==
- Gyselen, Rika (1998). "Ērān-Xwarrah-Yazdgerd". Encyclopaedia Iranica, Vol. VIII, Fasc. 5. p. 537.
