= Vache I of Albania =

Vache I was the second Arsacid ruler of Caucasian Albania from approximately 336 to 350. He was succeeded by Urnayr.

== Sources ==
- Chaumont, M. L. (1985). "Albania". Encyclopaedia Iranica, Vol. I, Fasc. 8. pp. 806–810.
- Gadjiev, Murtazali (2020). "The Chronology of the Arsacid Albanians". In Hoyland, Robert (ed.). From Albania to Arrān: The East Caucasus between the Ancient and Islamic Worlds (ca. 330 BCE–1000 CE). Gorgias Press. pp. 29–35. ISBN 978-1463239886.
