= Denag =

Sasanian queen

Queen regent of the Sasanian Empire
- Regency: 457–459
- Spouse: Yazdegerd II
- Issue: Peroz I Hormizd III; Zarir; Balash
- Religion: Zoroastrianism

Denag (fl. 459), was a Sasanian queen (banbishn). She was the wife of the king (shah) Yazdegerd II (r. 438–457), and functioned as queen regent in Ctesiphon during the civil war between her sons in 457–459.

== Life ==
Her origins are unknown, though given that her name had previously been used by Sasanian princesses, Denag may have been born a member of the royal family.

When Yazdegerd II died in 457, Hormizd III ascended the throne at Ray. His younger brother Peroz I, with the support of the powerful Mihranid magnate Raham Mihran, fled to the northeastern part of the empire and began raising an army in order to claim the throne for himself. The empire thus fell into a dynastic struggle and became divided; the mother of the two brothers, Denag temporarily ruled as regent of the empire from its capital, Ctesiphon.

Peroz eventually emerged victorious during the struggle, and became the new king of the Sasanian Empire. Hormizd was killed alongside three members of his family.

== Sources ==
- Brosius, Maria. "WOMEN i. In Pre-Islamic Persia". Encyclopaedia Iranica, Vol. London et al.
- Daryaee, Touraj (2008). Sasanian Persia: The Rise and Fall of an Empire. I.B.Tauris. pp. 1–240. ISBN 978-0857716668.
- Gignoux, Philippe (1994). "Dēnag". Encyclopaedia Iranica, Vol. VII, Fasc. 3. p. 282.
- Pourshariati, Parvaneh (2008). Decline and Fall of the Sasanian Empire: The Sasanian-Parthian Confederacy and the Arab Conquest of Iran. London and New York: I.B. Tauris. ISBN 978-1-84511-645-3.
- Shahbazi, A. Shapur (2004). "Hormozd III". Encyclopaedia Iranica, Vol. XII, Fasc. 5. pp. 465–466.
- Kia, Mehrdad (2016). The Persian Empire: A Historical Encyclopedia [2 volumes]: A Historical Encyclopedia. ABC-CLIO. ISBN 978-1610693912.
