= Raham Mihran =

Raham Mihran was a powerful Iranian military officer from the House of Mihran. He is first mentioned during the Sasanian dynastic struggle of 457-459 between the two brothers Hormizd III and Peroz I. Raham was a supporter of Peroz I, who was also his protege, and played a key role in the dynastic struggle, defeating Hormizd's forces and crowning Peroz I as the new Sasanian king.

== Sources ==
- Pourshariati, Parvaneh (2008). Decline and Fall of the Sasanian Empire: The Sasanian-Parthian Confederacy and the Arab Conquest of Iran. London and New York: I.B. Tauris. ISBN 978-1-84511-645-3.
- Shahbazi, A. Shapur (2004). "Hormozd III". In Yarshater, Ehsan (ed.). Encyclopædia Iranica. Vol. XII/5: Homosexuality III–Human migration II. London and New York: Routledge & Kegan Paul. pp. 465–466. ISBN 978-0-933273-79-5.
