= Seven Great Houses of Iran =

Sasanian-allied Parthian feudal aristocracies

The Seven Great Houses of Iran were seven elite families that wielded significant political and military power during the Sasanian era.

While secondary sources traditionally identify seven major families, which include the Karens, Surens, Ispahbudhans, Spandiyads, Mihrans, and possibly the Ziks, 3rd century Sasanian inscriptions only record four primary noble families, which are the Varaz, Suren, Karen, and Mihran. Over time, these powerful families established regional power bases, such as the Karens in Nahavand, the Surens in Sakastan, and the Ispahbudhans in Gorgan. They held vast, scattered estates, collected taxes from the local populace, and commanded ordinary people in the military under their direct leadership.

The epithet pahlaw (Parthian) never appears in inscriptions related to the Surens, who scholars speculate may have carried the epithet parsig (Persian) instead, though a member of the Karens also carries the epithet pahlaw on a seal. Michael Bonner notes that while seals and bullas show that families of Parthian descent survived into the Sasanian period, they do not prove the existence of a tribal identity or a distinct society.

== Origins ==
A legendary story on the origins of some of the great families are given by the 5th century Armenian historian Movses Khorenatsi. According to him, Parthian king Phraates IV had three sons named Artashes, Karen, Suren and a daughter named Koshm. Artashes succeeded him as king, while Karen and Suren established their namesake families, the Karens and Surens. Koshm married a "general of all Iranians", whose descendants "bore the title of Aspahpet Pahlav," which Parvaneh Pourshariati considers to correspond to the Ispahbudhan family. Both the Suren and Karin families maintained prominent positions under the Parthian Empire.

== History ==
Elite families of the aristocracy wielded significant authority during the Sasanian era. Seven great families in the Sasanian Empire (including the Sasanian family itself) frequently appear in secondary sources. According to Arthur Christensen, the six other families were the Karens, the Surens, the Ispahbudhans, the Spandiyads, the Mihrans and possibly the Ziks. According to Rika Gyselen; "Since the number 7 has a symbolic significance, as is generally known, one cannot be certain that the number of leading families should be taken literally as seven." He notes that 3rd century Sasanian inscriptions only mention four great families; Varaz, Suren, Karen and Mihran. The attested lord of Andegan (SKZ), the lord of Dumbawand (NPi), and the families of Farragan (SKZ) and Kadugan (SKZ) likely also belonged to the aristocracy. Because secondary sources do not mention these specific family names, their exact identities and ancestral seats remain uncertain. The same applies to the Varaz family, their omission likely being due to the persistent confusion between titles, names, and designations in the Sasanian era. The Kanarangiyan family, the hereditary holders of the kanarang office, might have belonged to one of the great families.

Attested members of the great families from 3rd century Sasanian inscriptions.
Shapur I's inscription at the Ka'ba-ye Zartosht (SKZ)		Paikuli inscription (NPi)
Court of Ardashir I (r. 224–241)	Court of Shapur I (r. 241–272)	Court of Bahram II (r. 276–293)
Dehen i Varaz; Sasan i Suren; Peroz i Karen; Gog i Karen	Ardashir i Varaz; Ardashir i Suren; Ardashir i Karen; Ashtad Mihran	Ardashir i Suren; Ohrmazd i Varaz; Narseh i Karen

Over time, several noble houses became closely linked to certain places; the Karens in Nahavand, the Surens in Sakastan, and the Ispahbudhans in Gorgan. Aristocratic estates were seemingly scattered throughout the realm and could never be fully consolidated. They were seemingly particularly concentrated in Media and Parthia, as well as in the Sasanian homeland of Pars. The exact legal advantages of the ruling class remain undocumented. It remains unclear whether these estates had complete or limited independence, or if they were fully under the authority of the government. Ordinary people paid taxes to the landowner, the government, or both. Additionally, they were required to serve in the military under the lord's leadership.

== Titles ==
The epithet pahlaw ("Parthian") never appears alongside in inscriptions about related to the Surens. This includes a two-language monument in Xi'an that a Suren commissioned. Gyselen and Pourshariati speculate that the Surens may have carried the epithet parsig ("Persian"). The Buzandaran Patmutiwnk mentions the epithet being carried by two Surens. An inscription of a seal designates the spahbed of Nemroz (which Sakastan was part of), Weh-Shabuhr, as aspbed ī pārsīg ("Persian Chief of the Cavalry"). A member of the Karens also carry the epithet pahlaw on a seal.

According to Michael Bonner, while seals and bullas show that families of Parthian descent survived into the Sasanian period, they do not prove the existence of a tribal identity or a distinct society. He notes that the Sasanian dynasty used neither local identity nor Persian ethnicity to claim power, and that the rapid disappearance of Greek and Parthian from early royal inscriptions indicates a distinct Parthian identity did not survive until the Arab conquest. Furthermore, Bonner points to a monument erected by the Suren family, the final remaining trace of the Sasanian court in exile, which demonstrates their voluntary loyalty to the exiled dynasty.

== See also ==
- Seven Achaemenid clans
- Sasanian government
- Dabuyid dynasty
- Padusbanids
- Ispahbads of Gilan
- Bavand dynasty
- Qarinvand dynasty
- Chosroid dynasty

== Sources ==
- Bonner, Michael (2020). The Last Empire of Iran. Gorgias Press. ISBN 978-1-4632-0616-1.
- Christensen, Arthur (1936). L'Iran sous les Sassanides (in French). Levin and Munksgaard. ISBN 978-9333682329.
- Gyselen, Rika (2001). The Four Generals of the Sasanian Empire: Some Sigillographic Evidence. Italian Institute for Africa and the Orient. pp. 5–53.
- Gyselen, Rika (2008). Kennet, Derek; Luft, Paul (eds.). Current Research in Sasanian Archaeology, Art and History Proceedings of a Conference held at Durham University, November 3rd and 4th, 2001. British Archaeological Reports. ISBN 978-1407302997.
- Lukonin, V. G. (1983), "Political, Social and Administrative Institutions", in Yarshater, Ehsan (ed.), Cambridge History of Iran, vol. 3, London: Cambridge UP, pp. 681–747.
- Yarshater, Ehsan (1997), "Esfandīār (2)", Encyclopedia Iranica, vol. 8, Costa Mesa: Mazda, pp. 592–593.
- Pourshariati, Parvaneh (2008), Decline and Fall of the Sasanian Empire: The Sasanian-Parthian Confederacy and the Arab Conquest of Iran, London: I.B. Tauris.
- Shahbazi, A. Shapur (2002). "Haft". Encyclopaedia Iranica, Vol. XI, Fasc. 5. pp. 511–515.
