= Kay (title) =

Ancient Iranian title

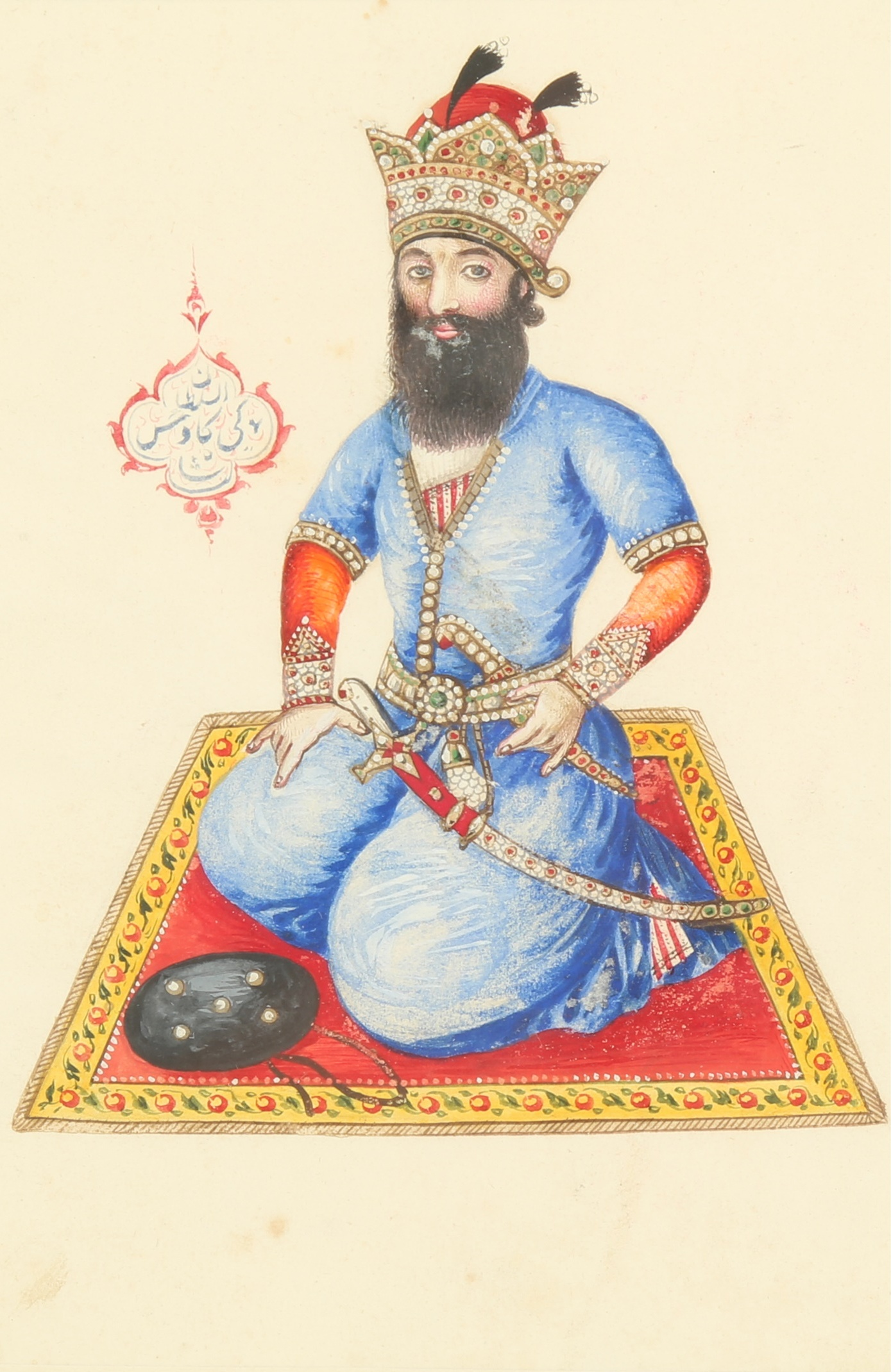

Kay (meaning "king") was a ruling title used in Iranian mythology by the Kayanians of the Avesta, later to be adopted by the Kushano-Sasanians, followed by the Sasanian monarchs of Iran. Some legendary rulers who held the title include Kay Kavus, Kay Khosrow, and Kay Lohrasp.

== Sources ==
- Rezakhani, Khodadad (2017). "East Iran in Late Antiquity". ReOrienting the Sasanians: East Iran in Late Antiquity. Edinburgh University Press. pp. 1–256. ISBN 9781474400305. JSTOR 10.3366/j.ctt1g04zr8. (registration required)
- Sauer, Eberhard (2017). Sasanian Persia: Between Rome and the Steppes of Eurasia. London and New York: Edinburgh University Press. pp. 1–336. ISBN 9781474401029.
- Schindel, Nikolaus (2013). "Sasanian Coinage". In Potts, Daniel T. (ed.). The Oxford Handbook of Ancient Iran. Oxford University Press. ISBN 978-0199733309.
