= Vachagan I =

Ruler of Caucasian Albania

Vachagan I "the Brave" was the first Arsacid ruler of Caucasian Albania, ruling approximately from 300 to 336.

== Sources ==
- Gadjiev, Murtazali (2020). "The Chronology of the Arsacid Albanians". In Hoyland, Robert (ed.). From Albania to Arrān: The East Caucasus between the Ancient and Islamic Worlds (ca. 330 BCE–1000 CE). Gorgias Press. pp. 29–35. ISBN 978-1463239886.
