= Niphates =

Fictional mountain chain in Armenia

Niphates is a mountain chain in Armenia that John Milton uses in Paradise Lost iii. 742 as Satan's landing spot upon Earth. Milton is noted for his extensive use of obscure geographical references in his works.
