= House of Zik =

- Country: Adurbadagan
- Current head: None, extinct
- Members: Zik
- Estate: Adurbadagan

The House of Zik (also recorded as House of Zix; Middle Persian: zikan, transl. Ziks; New Persian: dodmane zik, transl. Zik family) was an Iranian noble family during the Parthian and Sasanian rule in Iran. The house was from Median origin and was centered in Adurbadagan (modern-day Iranian Azerbaijan). 'Zik' was a 4th-century Iranian officer active during the reign of the Sasanian king (shah) Shapur II from the House of Zik.

== Sources ==
- Daryaee, Touraj (2009). "SHAPUR II". Encyclopaedia Iranica.
