= Personal names in the Sasanian Empire =

Only a limited number of the personal names preserved in Middle Persian Zoroastrian and Manichaean literature are directly linked to the Sasanian Empire. The same types of personal names recorded in Middle Persian documents are preserved in some neighboring languages. This occurs particularly in Syriac and Armenian texts, though Armenian borrowed more from Parthian names than Middle Persian.

== Typology and morphology of names ==
Many Middle Persian names in religious and non-religious texts followed the same naming patterns as earlier times. New type of names were also created during the Middle Iranian period. A unique habit in the Zoroastrian tradition was to simply translate Avestan names into the Pahlavi script.

Overall, the popularity of different name types changed compared to older times. Two-part names still existed but were no longer the most common choice. Only a very small number of names were direct continuations of Old Iranian names. For example, the Middle Persian name Gunda-farr comes from Old Persian Vinda-farnah, Husrav from Hu-sravah, and Mihr-dād from Mithra-dāta.

== Naming motivations ==
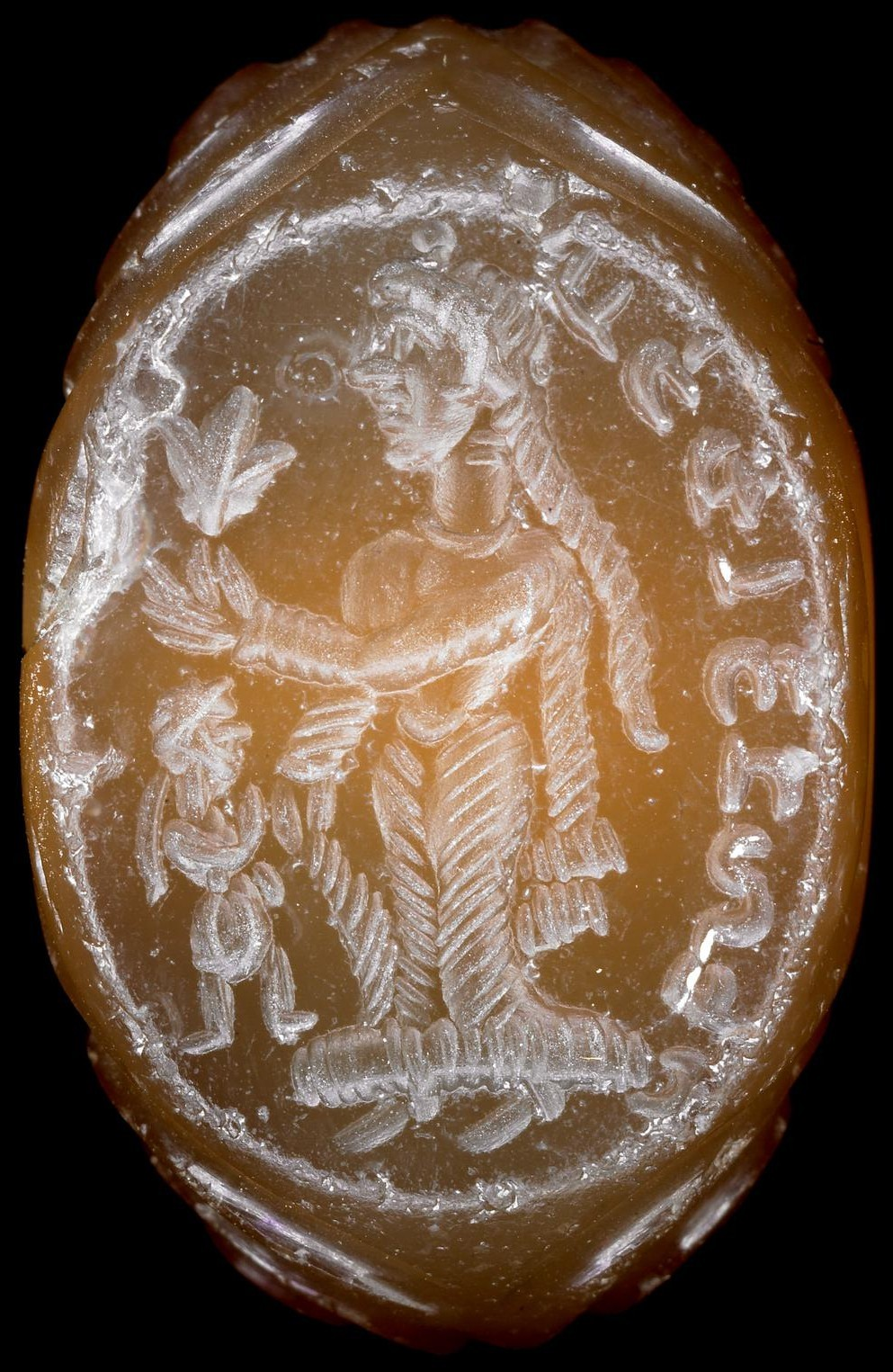
Chalcedony stamp seal of a female figure (possibly Anahita) and a magus with folded hands, with a Middle Persian inscription bearing the name Armindukht, Sasanian period, 4th century

Fathers and sons frequently shared a name component, such as "Dād-Farrox, son of Dād-Ādur", or had the same names, such as "Dād-Ohrmazd, son of Dād-Ohrmazd". Recording a paternal or family name involved specific grammatical forms. Suffixes like -an or -agan were added to the fathers name to indicate a parent. This modified father's name was usually linked to the son or daughters personal name using the word ī, such as names like Ardaxšīr ī Pābagān ("Ardaxšīr, son of Pābag"). Due to Parthian influence, the ī was sometimes excluded. Alternatively, the father's name followed the son's personal name without any grammatical changes, appearing with or without the Middle Persian word pus ("son").

During the Old Iranian era, theophoric names were widespread and possibly became even more widespread in later generations. Ādur, Anāhīd, (Ādur-)Farrbay, (Ādur-)Gušnasp, Māh, Mihr, Ohrmazd, and Vahrām were amongst the most common names. Some Sasanian rulers also had theophoric names, such as Ardaxšīr, Šābuhr, Narseh, Vahrām, and Husrav. Some names that include the name of a divinity also has a calendar reference, such as Māh-dād ("Given by Māh" [the Moon-god]), the divinity of the twelfth day of the month. There has been suggestions that these names refer to planets or the zodiac, but according to the German Iranologist Rüdiger Schmitt that is "pure speculation".

New naming methods emerged for women because traditional names no longer had clear features to separate them from the names of men. One common method was to use the name of a goddess. This could be done either by using the name of the goddess alone, like Spandarmad, or by placing it at the end of a two-part name, like Ādur-Anāhīd. Another method relied on the Middle Persian word duxt ("daughter"). This word was used loosely rather than literally, such as in the case of Yazdān-duxt ("daughter of the gods"). Some names relied on the adjective anōš, which directly translates to "immortal" but also means "sweet", "charming", or "dear". This naming method is the same as Armenian names that end in anoyš, such as Xosrov-anoyš.

== List of personal names ==
Name	Gender	Meaning	References
Ābān-dād	Male	"Created by the waters" (Aban)	
Abarzard	Male	Meaning uncertain (possibly "subsequent/second yellow")	
Abarz-šōy	Male	Meaning uncertain (second part may mean "husband")	
Āb-ihriy	Male	"Having the nature of water" (Aban)	
Āb-dānāg	Male	"Wise thanks to the water" (Aban)	
Abdaxš	Male	Meaning uncertain, possibly from Iranian "wonderful" or Semitic "servant"	
Āb-dōstar	Male	"Friend of the water" (Aban)	
Abd-vaxš	Male	"Having a wonderful spirit / remarkable growth"	
Abēšōy	Male	"Invulnerable" or "without a husband"	
Abē-xrad	Male	A nickname, meaning "without wisdom"	
Ābiy	Male	Hypocoristic form of a name based on "water"	
Ābōy	Male	Hypocoristic form of a name based on "water"	
Ābrōdag	Female	A combination of "water" (āb) and "river" (rōdag)	
Abursām	Male	Meaning uncertain (possibly a compound name beginning with "water")	
Āb-Xvar	Male	"Water (and) sun" (a religious name invoking two natural divinities)	
Āb-zōhr-Gušnaspān	Male	"Who makes a water libation", a patronymic related to the name Gušnasp	
Abzūd-Šābuhr	Male	"Increased by Shapur" (originally an ancient honorific title)	
Abzūd-Xvarrah	Male	"Having increased glory/light" (also transliterated as Abzūd-Farr)	
Ādarōg	Male	Name of the smallest of the sacred fires	
Ādig	Male	A nickname meaning "duck"	
Ādūg	Male	"Capable" / "strong"	
Ādur	Male	Shortened form of a name type meaning "protecting fire"	
Ādur-Ābōy	Male	Meaning uncertain, possibly "assistant of Ādur"	
Ādurān	Male	Patronymic of the name Ādur, or a name referring to a lower category of sacred fire	
Ādur-Anāhīd	Female	"Fire (and) Anahita" (a name invoking two divinities)	
Ādurān-dād	Male	"Created by the fire" (Ādurān)	
Ādurān-Farrox	Male	"Gifted with light" / "brilliant thanks to the (fire) Ādurān"	
Ādurān-Gušnasp	Male	A compound name invoking the sacred fires (the Ādurān and the Gušnasp)	
Ādurān-Mihr	Male	A name invoking two divinities: the (fire) Ādurān and Mithra (Mihr)	
Ādur-Ardag	Male	Hypocoristic form of a name invoking two divinities: Ādur and Ard	
Ādur-Arda(x)šīr	Male	Fire of Ardashir (invoking the first Sasanian king Ardashir I)	
Ādur-Ardāy	Male	Hypocoristic name invoking the two religious concepts Ādur and Arta. Alternatively meaning "saved by Ādur"	
Ādurbād	Male	"Protected by the fire"	
Ādurbād-anōš	Male	"Immortal Ādurbād" / "May Ādur be immortal"	
Ādurbād-Gušnasp	Male	A combination of Ādurbād ("protected by the fire") and the name of the fire Gušnasp	
Ādurbān	Male	"Protected by the fire"	
Ādur-bandag	Male	"Servant of the fire"	
Ādur-Bay	Male	"Ādur (and) God"	
Ādur-bed	Male	"Master of the fire". Originally used to be a title, derived from ātr- and -pati "chief"	
Ādurbed-Baypān	Male	Ādur-bed means "master of the fire", while Baypān means "protected by god"	
Ādur-bōzīd	Male	"Saved by Ādur"	
Ādur-burz	Male	Possibly a shortened form of the name Ādur-Burzmihr	
Ādur-Burzmihr	Male		
Ādur-buxt	Male	"Saved by Ādur"	
Ādur-Burzmihr-duxt	Female	"Daughter of Ādur-Burzmihr"	
Ādur-dād	Male	"Created by Ādur"	
Ādurdād-(Ušer)	Male	Composed of two parts: the first is identical to Ādur-dād, the second part is uncertain	
Ādur-dār	Male	"One who guards a fire" / "who is in charge of the fire" (possibly an ancient title or a hypocoristic form)	
Ādur-Dārāy	Male	"Fire of Darius" (possibly an ancient name of a fire)	
Ādur-duxt	Female	"Daughter of Ādur"	
Ādurēn	Male	Hypocoristic form with the suffix -ēn added to the name Ādur	
Ādurēn-dād	Male	Composed of the hypocoristic name Ādurēn and dād, meaning "created by Ādurēn", although the two parts may be unrelated	
Ādur-farr	Male	Derived from a bahuvrīhi compound *Ātṛ-farnah-, meaning "one who has the light/glory of Ādur"	
Ādur-Farrbay	Male	Name of the first of the three great Zoroastrian fires, derived from ātr- and a combination of *farnah- and *Baga- ("light of Baga" or "divine brilliance"), or from *farnah-bāga- ("one who has a share of light")	
Ādur-Farrbay-Gušnasp	Male	Name invoking the two great fires Ādur-Farrbay and Gušnasp	
Ādur-Farrbay-(Sahīgān)	Male	A combination of the great fire name Ādur-Farrbay and possibly an adjective meaning "worthy, proper"	
Ādur-Farrbay-Sēnbuxt	Male	A combination of the name of the grand fire Ādur-Farrbay and an element meaning "saved by the mythical bird Sēn"	
Ādur-Farrox	Male	"Luminous thanks to the Fire" / "Provided with light" / "Ādur is luminous"	
Ādur-Fravardīn/Fravahrān	Male	Name invoking two divinities Ādur and the Fravashis	
Ādur-Frāy-Gušnasp	Male	"One who favors the (fire) Gušnasp"	

== Sources ==
- Gignoux, Philippe (1986). Iranisches Personennamenbuch II, fasc. 2: Noms propres sassanides en moyen-perse épigraphique (in French). Austrian Academy of Sciences. ISBN 978-3700132080.
- Schmitt, Rüdiger (2021). "Personal names, Iranian v. Sasanian period". In Yarshater, Ehsan (ed.). Encyclopædia Iranica (Online ed.). Encyclopædia Iranica Foundation. ISSN 2156-2253.
