= Sakanshah =

Historical regnal title

Sakanshah (Middle Persian: Sagān-šāh, "king of the Saka") was the title used by the rulers (and later governors) of Sakastan, first appearing during Surenid rule. The title was also used by the governors of Sakastan and Turgistan during the Sasanian era. However, during the early reign of king Peroz I (r. 459–484), the title was abolished.

== Sources ==
- Bosworth, Clifford Edmund (1997). "Sīstān". The Encyclopedia of Islam, New Edition, Volume IX: San–Sze. Leiden, and New York: BRILL. pp. 681–685. ISBN 9789004082656.
- Christensen, Peter (1993). The Decline of Iranshahr: Irrigation and Environments in the History of the Middle East, 500 B.C. to A.D. 1500. Museum Tusculanum Press. pp. 1–351. ISBN 9788772892597.
- Frye, Richard Nelson (1984). The History of Ancient Iran. C.H.Beck. pp. 1–411. ISBN 9783406093975.
- Gazerani, Saghi (2015). The Sistani Cycle of Epics and Iran's National History: On the Margins of Historiography. BRILL. pp. 1–250. ISBN 9789004282964.
