= Shahrestan-haye Iranshahr =

Middle Persian text on geography

Šahrestānīhā ī Ērānšahr
- Language: Middle Persian
- Subject: Geography
- Publication place: Sasanian Empire, latest edit in the Abbasid period

Shahrestan-haye Iran-Shahr (Persian: شهرستان‌های ایرانشهر, romanized: Šahrestānīhā-ye Ērānšahr, lit. 'The Provincial Capitals of Iran') is a surviving Middle Persian text on geography, which was completed in the late eighth or early ninth centuries AD. The text gives a numbered list of the cities of Eranshahr and their history and importance for Persian history. The text itself has indication that it was also redacted at the time of Khosrow II (r. 590–628) in 7th century as it mentions several places in Africa and Persian Gulf conquered by the Sasanians.

The book serves as a source for works on Middle Iranian languages, a source on Sasanian administrative geography and history, as well as a source of historical records concerning names of the Sasanian kings as the builder of the various cities. The text provide information on the Persian epic, the Xwadāy-nāmag (lit. “Book of Kings”).

The book may be the same as "Ayādgār ī Šahrīhā" (lit. “Memoir of Cities") named in the Bundahishn and said to have been written following an order of Kavad I.

== Terms Eran and Eranshahr ==
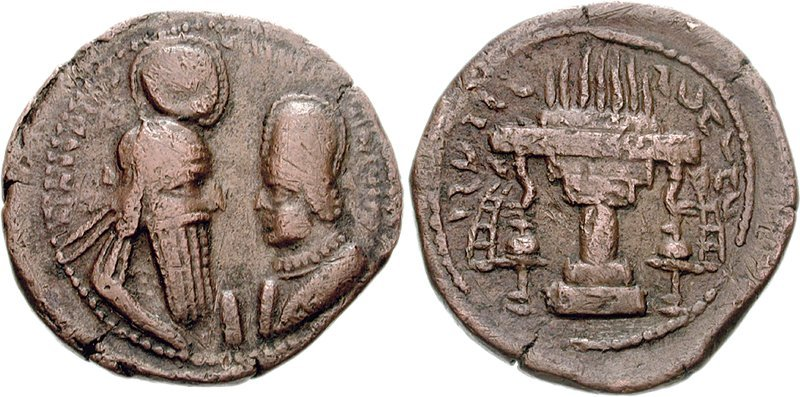
Coin of Ardashir I (r. 224–242) and Shapur I (r. 240-270)

The terms Eranshahr ( ) and Eran were in use in Sasanian Iran. From early Sasanian era (Ardashir I and Shapur I's elaborations), as a designation of their land they adopted Ērānšahr “Land of the Aryans” and this served as the official name of their country.

Ardashir I, who was the first king of the Sasanian Empire, had used the older word ērān (Parthian aryān) as part of his titles and in accordance with its etymology. At Naqsh-e Rostam in Fars province and the issued coins of the same period, Ardashir I calls himself Ardašīr šāhānšāh ērān in the Middle Persian version and šāhānšāh aryān in its Parthian version both meaning “king of kings of the Aryans.” His son Shapur I referred to himself as šāhānšāh ērān ud anērān (lit. "king of kings of the Aryans and the Non-Aryans") in Middle Persian and šāhānšāh aryān ud anaryān in Parthian. Later kings used the same or similar phrases. and these titles became the standard designations of the Sasanian sovereigns.

However the major trilingual (Middle Persian, Parthian, and Greek) inscription of Shapur I at the Ka'ba-ye Zartosht in Fars, introduces another term Ērānšahr in Middle Persian, Aryānxšahr in Parthian, and Arianōn ethnos in Greek. Shapur's declaration reads an. . .ērānšahr xwadāy hēm.. (lit. “I am lord of the kingdom (Gk. nation) of the Aryans”). This follows his title “king of kings of the Aryans,” and thus makes it "very likely" that ērānšahr "properly denoted the empire". Next to Darius's inscription, this inscription of Shapur at walls of Ka'ba-ye Zartosht is among the most important inscriptional records. It records parts of Persian-Roman wars and gives "a clear picture of the extent of his empire" by naming of provinces, mentioning religious foundations and mentioning senior officials of the court of Papak, Ardashir and Shapur I. According to the inscription, after death of Shapur's father and his accession, the Roman emperor Gordianus III “marched on Assyria, against Ērānšahr and against us”.

Beside the royal title, the term "Eran" was also used as an abbreviation of "Eranshahr" and referred to the empire in the early Sasanian era. In this case the Roman west was correspondingly referred to as “anērān”. As references to empires, Eran and Aneran occur already in a calendrical text from Mānī (dating back probably to Ardashir I's era.) This shorter term "Eran" appears in the names of the towns build by Shapur I and his successors as well as in the titles of several high-ranking administrative officials and military commanders. For the former there are examples such as "Eran-xwarrah-Shapur" (The glory of Eran (of) Shapur), "Eran-ashan-kard-kavad" (Kavad pacified Eran) and for the latter "Eran-amargar" (Accountant-General), ”Eran-dibīrbed" (Chief Secretary), ”Eran-drustbed“ (Chief Medical Officer), ”Eran-hambāragbed" (Commander of the Arsenal), and ”Eran-spāhbed“ (Commander-in-Chief).

== Kusts of Eranshahr ==
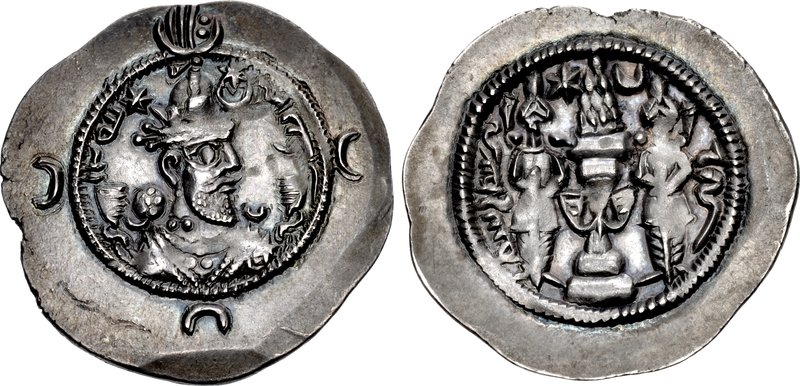
Coin of Khosrow I (531–579)

According to the book and as an ancient Iranian tradition, Ērānšahr is divided into four "mythologically and mentally" defined regions or sides called kusts. These parts/regions/sides of the state during and after Khosrow I, on the pattern of the four cardinal points, are (1) Xwarāsān “northeast”; (2) Xwarwarān “southwest”; (3) Nēmrōz “southeast”; and (4) Ādurbādagān “northwest”.

The kusts were named diagonally beginning from northeast to southwest, and from southeast to northwest-a style likely following an Old Persian tradition in naming satraps. The usual Middle Persian term "abāxtar" (loanword from MIr.s: abāxtar, abarag <Av.: apāxtara) used for northern direction in ancient Iranian tradition has been avoided in this designation and replaced by the name of their province ādurbādagān. This is believed to be because of "the Zoroastrian association of the north with the abode of evil" which "would be evoked by use of abāxtar".

== Bibliography ==
- Daryaee, Touraj (2008). "ŠAHRESTĀNĪHĀ Ī ĒRĀNŠAHR". Encyclopaedia Iranica. Vol. To appear.
- Daryaee, Touraj (2002). Sahrestaniha I Eransahr (PDF). Mazda Pub. p. 90. ISBN 1-56859-143-8.
- Markwart, J. (1931). A catalogue of the provincial capitals of Eranshahr. Rome: Pontificium Institutum Biblicum. ISBN 88-7653-203-X.
- Mackenzie, D. N. (1998). "ĒRĀN,ĒRĀNŠAHR". Encyclopaedia Iranica. Vol. 8. ISBN 1-56859-058-X.
- Shahbazi, A. Shapur (2005). "SASANIAN DYNASTY". Encyclopaedia Iranica. Vol. To appear. ISBN 1-56859-058-X.
- Tafazzoli, A. (1989). "BĀḴTAR". Encyclopaedia Iranica. Vol. 3. ISBN 1-56859-058-X.
