= Murtazali Gadjiev =

Russian-Dagestani archaeologist and scholar

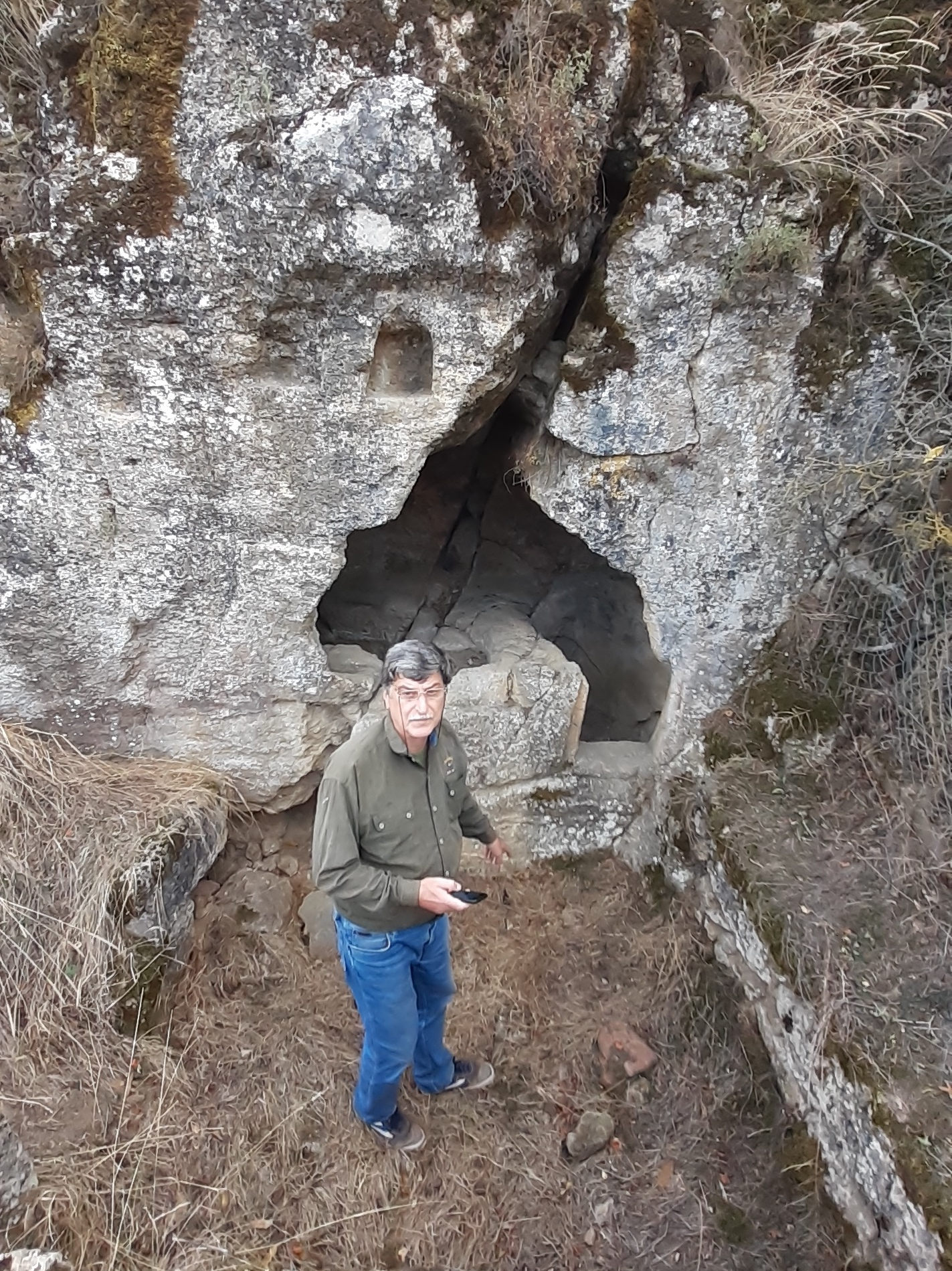
Murtazali Gadjiev in front of a Zoroastrian dakhma in 2019

Murtazali Gadjiev (Russian: Муртазали Гаджиев) is a Russian-Dagestani archaeologist and scholar. He is the head of the archaeology department of Dagestan Scientific Center of Russian Academy of Science.

Gadjiev is specialised in the history of Derbent (Darband), Sasanian-era Persian presence in Caucasus and Culture of Caucasian Albania.

== Life and work ==
Born in 1956 in Makhachkala, Republic of Dagestan and graduated from Daghestan State University (Makhachkala) and Institute of Archaeology, RAS, in Moscow. He has been a professor of 'Field Archaeology' at the Daghestan University in Makhachkala for around 10 years.

Murtazali Gadjjiev is a member of the Editorial board of the Journal of Caucasian Archeology, Tbilisi, and Deputy-Chairman of the Coordinating Committee of The International Conference on the North Caucasus Archaeology Krupnovskie chteniya.
