= Turan (Sasanian province) =

Province of the Sasanian Empire

Sasanian Turan
- 230–c.650 CE
- Map of the southeastern provinces of the Sasanian Empire.
- Historical era: Antiquity
  - Established: 230
  - Disestablished: c.650 CE
Preceded by	Succeeded by
Indo-Parthians	Rashidun Caliphate
- Today part of: Pakistan

Turan (also spelled Turgistan and Turestan) was a province of the Sasanian Empire located in present-day southwestern Pakistan. The province was bordered Paradan in the west, Hind in the east, Sakastan in the north, and Makuran in the south. The main city and bastion of the province was Bauterna (Khuzdar/Quzdar).

The province was mainly populated by Indians, and had been a kingdom under the Indo-Parthian king Pahares I, before submitting to the first Sasanian monarch Ardashir I (r. 224–242) in 230 AD. These events were recorded by al-Tabari, describing the arrival of envoys from Makran and Turan to Ardeshir at Gor:

Then he [Ardashir] marched back from the Sawad to Istakhr, from there first to Sagistan, then to Gurgan, then to Abrasahr, Merv, Balkh, and Khwarizm to the farthest boundaries of the provinces of Kohrasan, whereupon he returned to Merv. After he had killed many people and sent their heads to the Fire temple of Anahedh he returned from Merv to Pars and settled in Gor. Then envoys of the king of the Kushan, of the kings of Turan and Mokran came to him with declarations of their submission.

Turan was then governed by the Sakanshah, the first notable one being Ardashir I's grandson, Narseh. The province is mentioned in Shapur I's inscription at the Ka'ba-ye Zartosht of 262 CE, among the many provinces of the Sasanian Empire:

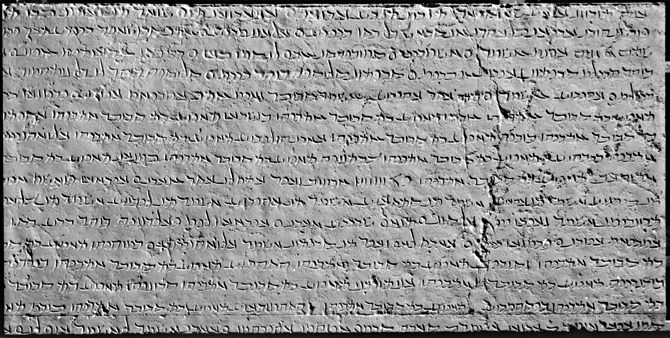
Parthian version of the Shapur I inscription at Ka'ba-ye Zartosht.

"And I (Shapur I) possess the lands: Fars Persis, Pahlav (Parthia) (......) and all of Abarshahr (all the upper (eastern, Parthian) provinces), Kerman (Kirman), Sakastan, Turgistan, Makuran, Pardan (Paradene), Hind (Sind) and Kushanshahr all the way to Pashkibur (Peshawar?) and to the borders of Kashgaria, Sogdia and Chach (Tashkent) and of that sea-coast Mazonshahr (Oman)."

— Shapur I's inscription at the Ka'ba-ye Zartosht (262 CE), translation by Josef Wiesehöfer (1996).

The 19th-century historian Wilhelm Tomaschek suggested that the name of Turan possibly derived from the Iranian word tura(n), meaning "hostile, non-Iranian land". The name was also used in the Iranian national epic Shahnameh ("The Book of Kings") to denote the lands above Khorasan and the Oxus River, later viewed as the land of the Turks and other non-Iranians.

The region was conquered by the Rashidun Caliphate circa 650 CE, as part of the Indian subcontinent.

== Sources ==
- Bosworth, C. E. (2011). "Ṭurān". Encyclopaedia Iranica.
- Brunner, Christopher (1983). "Geographical and Administrative divisions: Settlements and Economy". The Cambridge History of Iran: The Seleucid, Parthian, and Sasanian periods (2). Cambridge: Cambridge University Press. pp. 747–778. ISBN 978-0-521-24693-4.
- Gardner, Iain (2014). Mani at the Court of the Persian Kings: Studies on the Chester Beatty Kephalaia Codex. BRILL. pp. 1–332. ISBN 9789004282629.
- Sauer, Eberhard (2017). Sasanian Persia: Between Rome and the Steppes of Eurasia. London and New York: Edinburgh University Press. pp. 1–336. ISBN 9781474401029.
- Weber, Ursula (2016). "Narseh". Archived copy. Encyclopaedia Iranica. Archived from the original on 2019-05-29.
