= Paratarajas =

Dynasty of Parthian kings (circa 125 CE to circa 300 CE)

- c.125 CE–c.300 CE
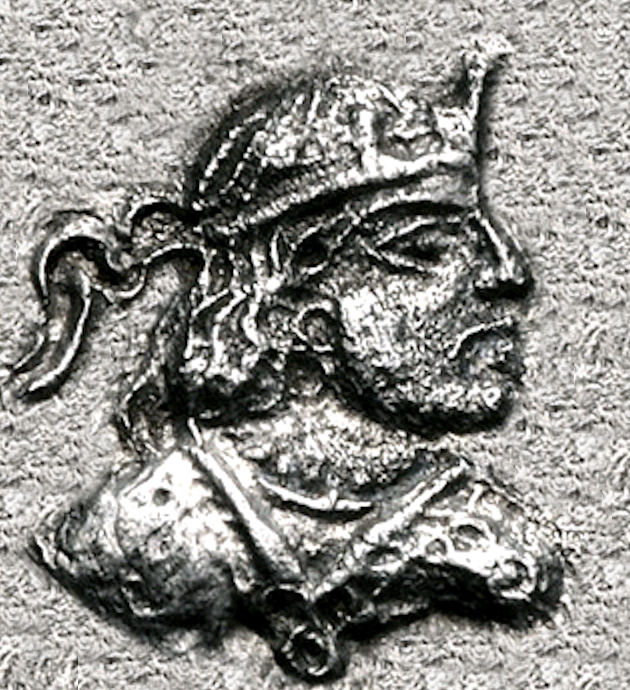
- Portrait of Paratarajas ruler Kozana circa 200-220 CE.

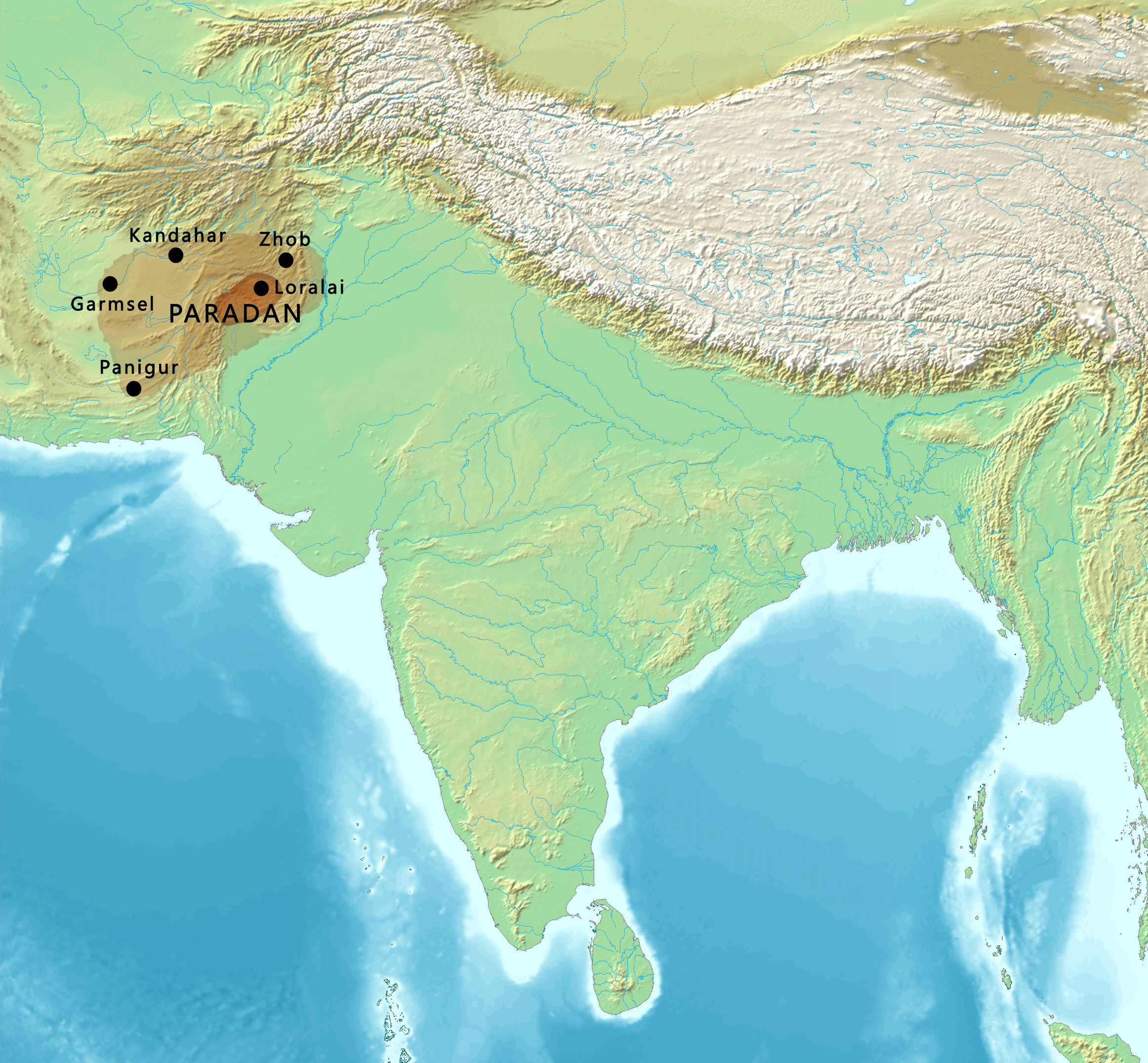
- Core territory and possible maximum extent of Paradan, and neighbouring polities in Southern Asia in the 2nd century CE.
- Historical era: Late Antiquity
  - Established: c.125 CE
  - Disestablished: c.300 CE
Preceded by	Succeeded by
Indo-Parthian Kingdom	Hind (Sasanian province); Kushano-Sasanians
- Today part of: Pakistan

The Pāratarājas (Brahmi: Pāratarāja, Kharosthi: 𐨤𐨪𐨟𐨪𐨗 Pa-ra-ta-ra-ja, Parataraja, "Kings of Pārata") or Pāradarājas were a dynasty that ruled parts of present-day West Pakistan including Balochistan from c. 125 to c. 300 CE. The polity appears to have been of Western Iranian origin and is known primarily from its coinage.

== Sources ==
The ancient history of Balochistan is poorly documented. Knowledge of the Paratarajas derives primarily from its coinage, most of which has been discovered in and around Loralai. (Note: Finds have been also reported from Zhob, Quetta, Chaman, and Kandahar.)

=== Coinage ===
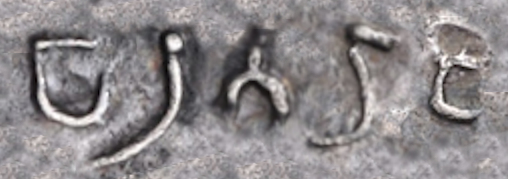
The name "Parataraja" in the Brahmi script ( Pāratarāja) on a coin of Arjuna.

The coinage was first studied by E. J. Rapson in 1905 and later subjected to a comprehensive evaluation by B. N. Mukherjee in 1972. Both studies have since been superseded by the analyses of Pankaj Tandon and Harry Falk.

Coinage was issued in five denominations—didrachms, drachms, hemidrachms, quarter drachms, and obols—though not every rulers issued all denominations. The first six rulers struck stable denominations in silver which were subsequently debased before being replaced by billon and then copper mints. Tandon notes several similarities between Parataraja coinage and that of the Indo-Parthians, particularly in metrological standards and shape, as well as with that of the Western Satraps, especially in materials. (Note: Tandon rejects Sassanian influence on the coins. This is rejected by Nikolaus Schindel.)

The coins typically exhibit a bust on the obverse and a swastika—either right-facing or left-facing—on the reverse, circumscribed by a Prakrit legend in Brahmi script (usually on silver issues) or Kharoshthi script (usually on copper issues). Thie legend records the name of the issuer followed by a patronymic, and the title, "King of Paratas". A distinctive feature of Paratarāja coinage is how legends were frequently left truncated when insufficient space remained on the die.

=== Inscriptions ===
Four contemporaneous inscriptions refer to the polity. Two are Sassanian edicts that make brief references to the Paratarajas; another comprises a collection of inscribed potsherds recording Yola Mira's patronage of Buddhist monks; the fourth is a stone-slab commemorating Datayola founding a new city.

==== Sasanian Edicts ====
The Paikuli inscription, erected by Narseh (r. 293-302) following his victory over Bahram III, records an anonymous "Pāradānshah" (King of Pardan) to have been among the many who congratulated him upon the occasion.

Shapur I's inscription at the Ka'ba-ye Zartosht in Naqsh-i-Rustam, dated to 262, lists "P'rtu"/"Pardan" among the provinces of the Sasanian Empire:

And I [Shapur I] possess the lands: Fars Persis, Pahlav [Parthia] ... and all of Abarshahr [all the upper (eastern, Parthian) provinces], Kerman, Sakastan, Turgistan, Makuran, Pardan Paradene, Hind [Sind] and Kushanshahr all the way to Pashkibur [Peshawar?] and to the borders of Kashgaria, Sogdia and Chach [Tashkent] and of that sea-coast Mazonshahr [Oman].

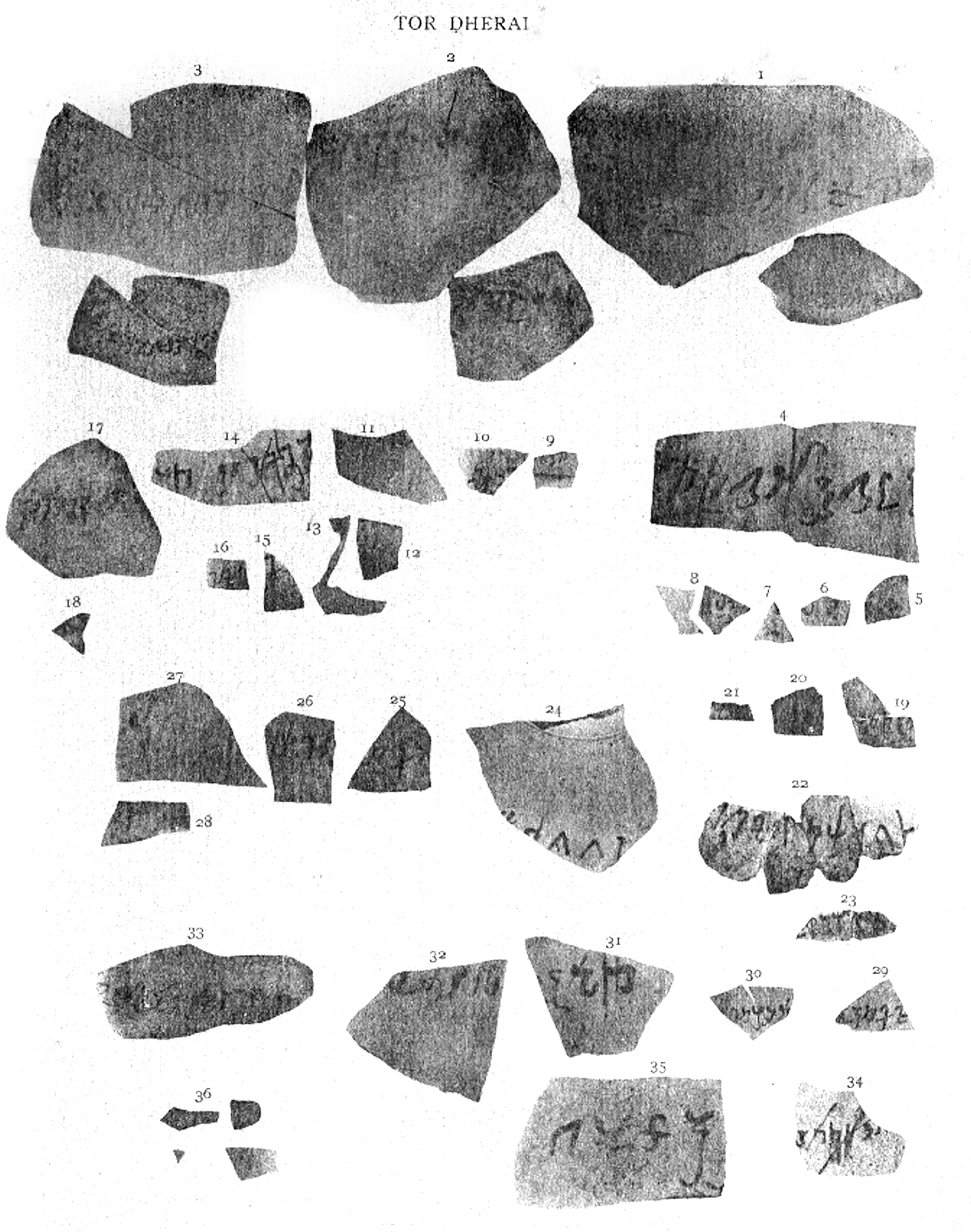
The Tor Dherai inscribed potsherds mentioning the Parataraja King, Yolamira

==== Potsherds ====
During excavations conducted in 1926 and 1927 at the Buddhist site of Tor Dherai in Loralai, under Aurel Stein, a number of potsherds bearing Prakrit inscriptions in the Brahmi and Kharosthi scripts were discovered. (Note: The finds are presently in the Central Antiquities Collection, Archaeological Survey of India, New Delhi.) When publishing the finds about three years later, Sten Konow was unable to decipher the Brahmi legends but translated the Kharosthi text as follows, recording Yola Mira endowing a water-hall for Buddhist monks:

Of the Shahi Yola Mira, the master [owner (Note: Consult Schopen (1996) on why this is a better choice.)] of the vihara, this water hall [is] the religious gift, in his own Yola-Mira-shahi-Vihara, to the order of the four quarters, in the acceptance of the Sarvastivadin teachers. And from this right donation may there be in future a share for [his] mother and father, in future a share for all beings and long life for the master of the law.

Yola Mira, whose existence was unknown at the time of the excavation, has since been identified through coinage as the earliest Parataraja ruler. For many years, the potsherds constituted the only non-numismatic evidence for any member of the dynasty.

==== Stone-slab ====
A bilingual stone-slab inscription in Brahmi and Kharosthi commemorates the establishment of an eponymous city by Datayola in the sixteenth year of his reign. A right-facing Swastika is engraved on the inscription.

=== Classical literature ===
No mention of the dynasty is found in extant literature; however, classical literature in Greek, Latin, and Sanskrit make mention of tribal polities named "Parētakēnoí" (Πᾰρητᾰκηνοί), "Pareitakai/Pareitacae" (Παρειτάκαις), "Parsidai" (Παρ?óδòν > Παρσιδὦν (?)), "Paraetaceni", "Paradene" (Παραδηνή) and "Parada". Tandon accepts Mukherjee's theory all of these names refer to the same entity, who gave rise to the dynasty; he cites Datayola's coin-inscriptions in support.

Around 440 BCE, Herodotus described of the Parētakēnoí as one of the Median tribes that were collectively ruled by Deiokes. Arrian records Alexander to have encountered the Pareitakai in Sogdian province — in his account, that parallels those by Quintus Curtius Rufus, Strabo, and Plutarch, a siege was mounted but eventually their ruler offered submission and was rewarded with governorship of other provinces. Isidore of Charax (fl. 0 C.E - ?) (Note: We get this information from Stathmoi Parthikoi, which is believed to have been excerpted from a now-lost exhaustive account of Parthian Empire. This account, in turn was likely dependent on an older survey dating back to the times of Mithridates II.) noted Paraitakene was the geographical area beyond Sakastene. The Periplus of the Erythraean Sea (1st century CE) describes the territory of the Parsidai beyond the Ommanitic region on the coast of Balochistan. The contemporaneous text Natural History by Pliny records the Paraetaceni to be between Aria and Parthia. Ptolemy notes Paradene was a toponym for an interior region of Gedrosia.

== Geography ==
Classical sources portray the Paratarājas as a migrant tribal polity that originated in what is now northwestern Iran, or regions further to the west, before gradually moving to the eastern fringes of the Parthian world. It was there, according to this reconstruction, that they emerged as an independent polity. However, neither the available inscriptions nor the coinage permits the geographical extent of their realm to be determined with any precision.

Nonetheless, most scholars have placed the polity in western Balochistan, between Turan and Sistan. Tandon disputes this "implicit consensus", finding it to be unsupported by firm evidence. He argues that Shapur I's inscription lists provinces in a west-to-east geographical sequence, placing Pardan between Makran and Hind, which would accord well with the abundant finds of coins and potsherds in Loralai. Accordingly, he proposes the Paratarajas to have ruled the district and its environs, probably extending westwards to modern-day Quetta (or as far as Kandahar) and northeastwards to modern-day Zhob.

== Dating ==
There exists no conclusive evidence to date the establishment of Paratarajas in Balochistan. Tandon has proposed an establishment c. 125 CE on the basis of several lines of circumstantial evidence:

- The regnal title Shahi, attested in the potsherds and on some coins of Yolamira, is known to have been revived by Kanishka (c. 127–150).
- The earliest known use of patronymic legends on coins in the Indian subcontinent outside the Parataraja series occurs on the coinage of Chastana (c. 78–130 CE) of the Western Satraps.
- The obverse bust depicted on the coins of the early Paratarajas closely resembles that of a rare copper type issued by Rudradaman (c. 130–150 CE; successor to Chastana).
- Paleographic analyses of the Brahmi legends place the Parataraja coinage in the second century.

The end of Paratarajas can be dated with greater confidence—two overstrikes by Datayol, the last known Parataraja ruler, on coins of the Kushano-Sasanian ruler Hormizd I provide a terminus post quem of c. 275 CE. Tandon argues that this chronology (c. 125 CE - c. 275 CE) is supported by two considerations. First, it implies an average reign length of about fifteen years per ruler, which is consistent with the norms for ancient dynasties. Second, it places Koziya's reign around c. 230 CE, a date that accords with numismatic evidence connecting the curved hem on the obverse bust of his coinage with that on coins of the contemporary Kanishka II.

== History ==
=== Rulers ===
A rough lineage of Paratarajas rulers can be reconstructed from numismatic evidence as follows:

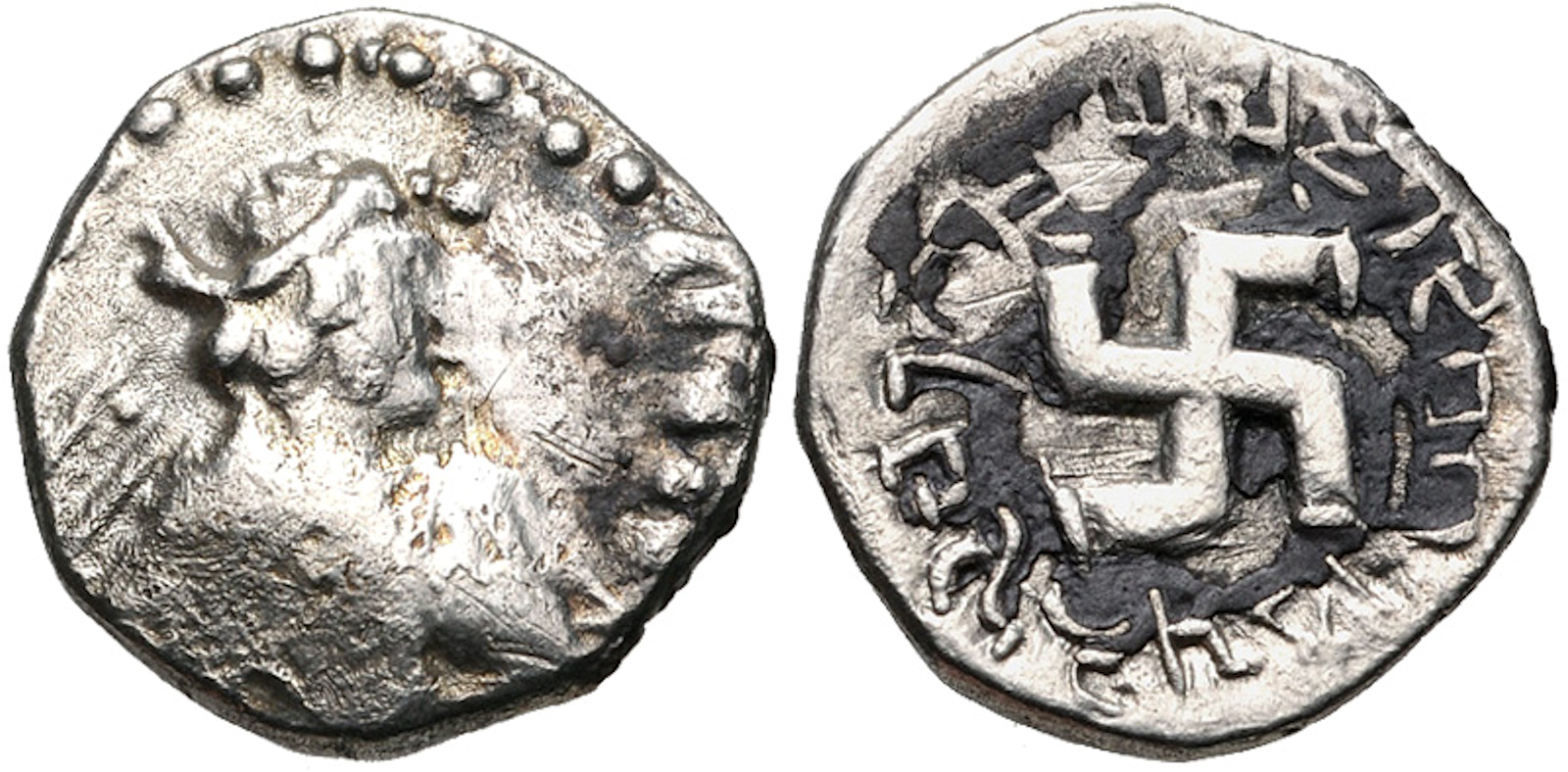
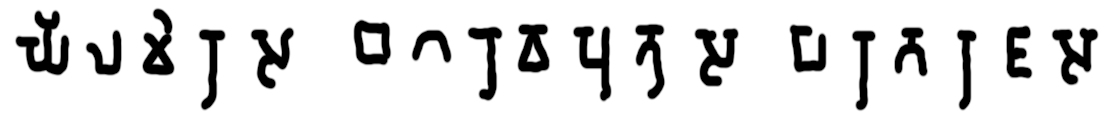
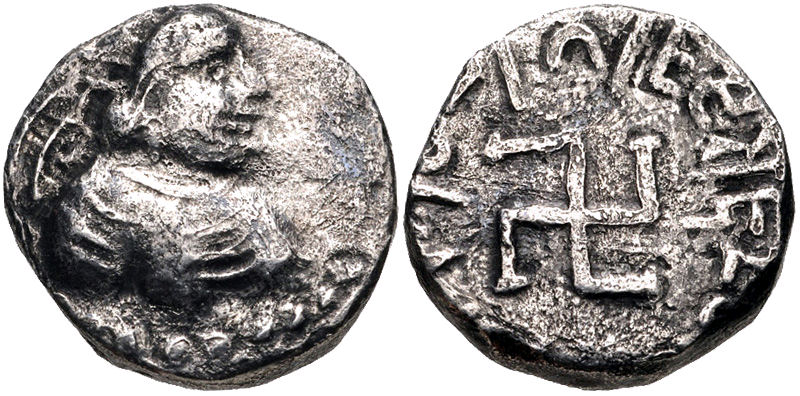
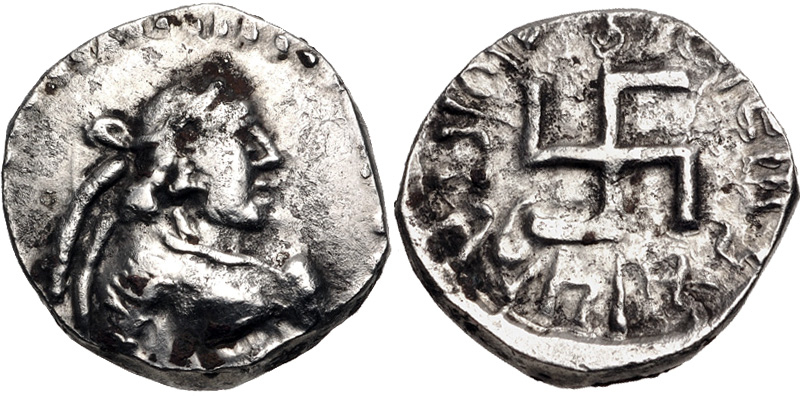
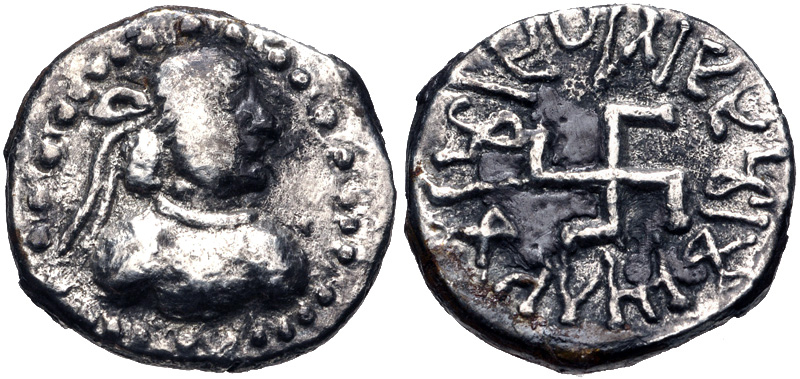
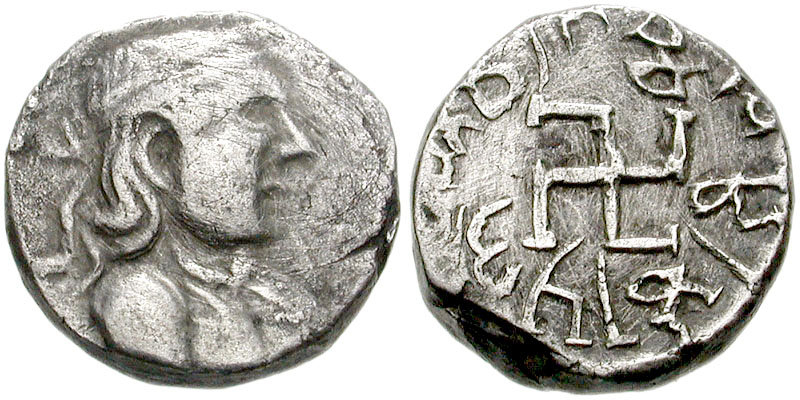
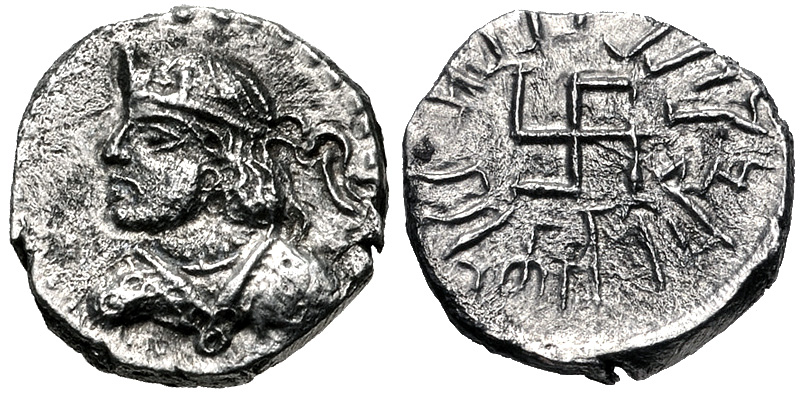
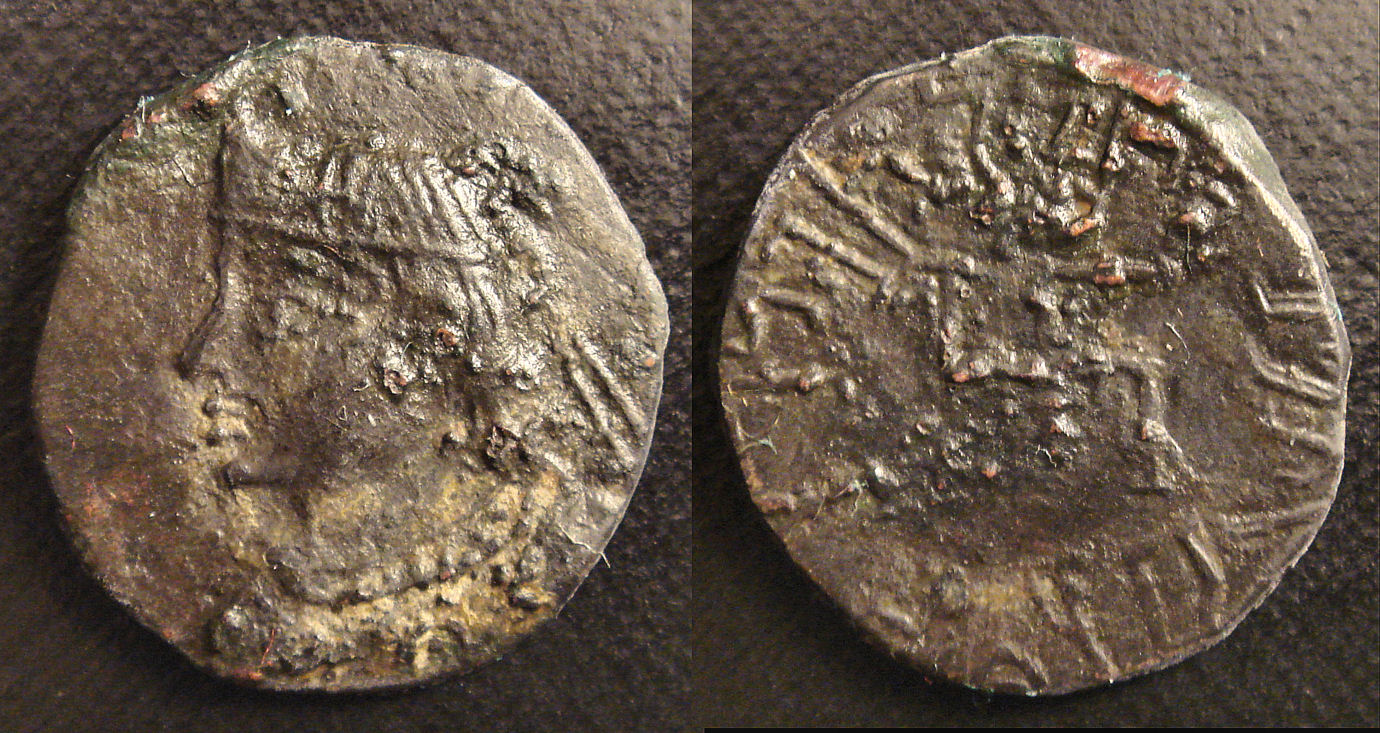
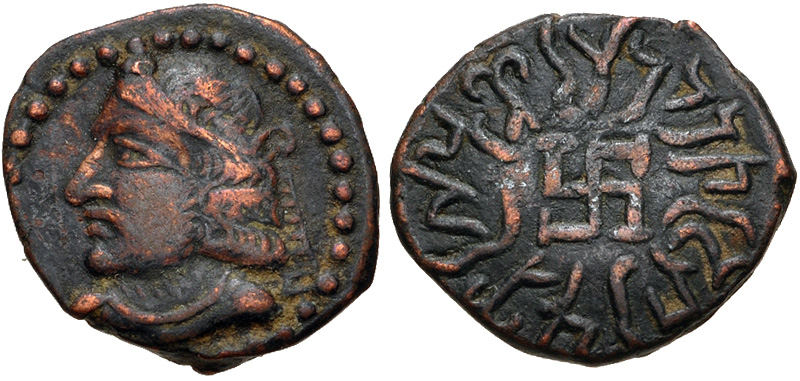
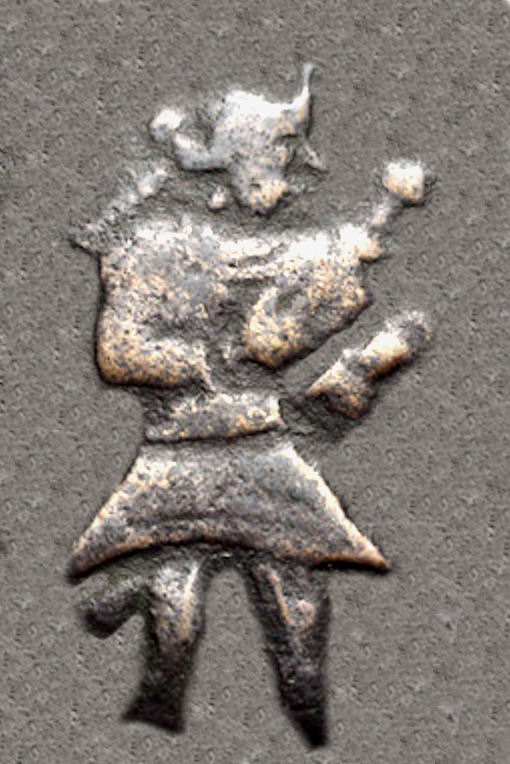
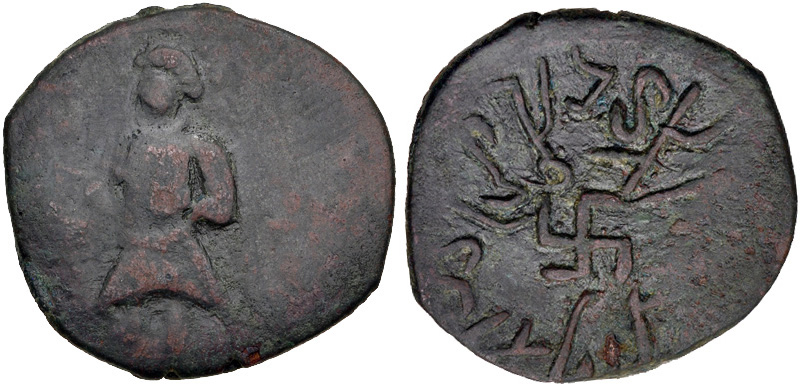
Ruler	Coin	Filiation	Approx. dates (Note: The individual dates are rough estimates based on approximate general dates about the dynasty and reconstructions of the lineage, and Tandon gives two possible starting points, in 125 CE and 150 CE.)	Discussion
Yolamira	Pāratarājas. Yolamira. Circa AD 125-150	Son of Bagareva	c. 125–150 CE	The name translates to "Warrior Mithra" in Bactrian.; Coinage was issued in all five denominations. Three distinct phases of minting have been identified: a bearded bust on the obverse paired with a right-facing swastika on the reverse; a clean-shaven bust paired with a left-facing swastika; and a clean-shaven bust paired with a right-facing swastika. Didrachms were struck only during the second phase.; The coin legend ran in the Brahmi script: Yolamirasa Bagarevaputrasa Pāratarājasa "Of the king of the Paratas, Yolamira, son of Bagareva"
Bagamira		Eldest son of Yolamira	c. 150 CE	The name translates to "Lord Mithra".; Only two drachms are known, both struck using a die from the third phase of Yolamira's coinage.; The coin legend, Bagamirasa Yolamiraputrasa Pāratarājasa, runs in the Brahmi script.
Arjuna	Paratarajas_ruler_Arjuna_Circa_150-165_CE.	Second son of Yolamira	c. 150–160 CE	The name was probably adopted from the eponymous hero of the Mahabharata, a Hindu epic; Tandon hypothesizes that he might have been the son of an Indian wife.; During the first phase of his coinage, Arjuna struck drachms and hemidrachms using Bagamira's obverse die paired with a right-facing swastika on the reverse. In a subsequent phase, a new obverse die was coupled with a left-facing swastika to issue the same denominations. A third, probably later, phase employed the same obverse die with a right-facing swastika to strike drachms.; The coin legend, Arjunasa Yolamiraputrasa Pāratarājasa, runs in the Brahmi script.
Hvaramira	Pāratarājas. Hvaramira. Circa AD 165-175	a third son of Yolamira	c. 160–175 CE	The name translates to "Glorious Mithra"; hvara > khwarrah.; Three phases of coinage have been identified. In the first, Hvaramira struck drachms using Arjuna's final obverse die from the third phase paired with a right-facing swastika on the reverse. The second phase introduced a new obverse die and included both drachms and didrachms. In the final phase, the same obverse die was paired with a left-facing swastika to issue only drachms.; The coin legend, Hvaramirasa Yolamiraputrasa Pāratarājasa, runs in the Brahmi script; some coins use a variant spelling of Yodamiraputrasa.
Mirahvara	Pāratarājas. Mirahvara. Circa AD 175-185	son of Hvaramira	c. 175–185 CE	The name translates to "Glorious Mithra".; Three phases of coinage are attested. During the first, Mirahvara employed Hvaramira's final die for drachms, Arjuna's second-phase hemidrachm die for quarter drachms, and Yolamira's third-phase die for hemidrachms; all were struck with a right-facing swastika on the reverse. The second phase paired Hvaramira's second- and third-phase dies with a left-facing swastika to produce didrachms and drachms, respectively. In the third phase, a new die and Yolamira's third-phase die were paired with a right-facing swastika to issue drachms and hemidrachms, respectively.; The coin legend, Mirahvarasa Hvaramiraputrasa Pāratarājasa, runs in the Brahmi script.
Miratakhma	Parata Rajas. Miratakhma	another son of Hvaramira	c. 185–200 CE	The name translates to "Heroic Mithra."; Only drachm and hemidrachm issues are known; however, Tandon considers didrachms likely given the abundance of Miratakhma's coinage. The coinage cannot be assigned to clearly defined phases. Drachms were struck from both Mirahvara's third-phase die and a new die, with examples bearing both right-facing and left-facing swastikas on the reverse. The hemidrachms employed Arjuna's second-phase die paired with a right-facing swastika.; The coin legend, Mirahvarasa Hvaramiraputrasa Pāratarājasa, runs in the Brahmi script. Is the only king to have some drachms feature a Sanskrit legend, Miratakhmasya Hvaramiraputrasya Pāratarāja(sya).
Kozana	Pāratarājas Kozana Circa 200-220 CE	son of Bagavharna (and perhaps grandson of Bagamira?)	c. 200–220 CE	The meaning of the name cannot be conclusively deciphered; Harry Falk speculates a connection with the homonymous founder of the Kushana empire.; Kozana was the first Paratarāja ruler to issue coins bearing Kharosthi legends, a practice that was adopted by subsequent rulers. His coinage also exhibits the earliest significant debasement in the series.; All known issues were struck from dies inherited from Miratakhma and were paired with a right-facing swastika on the reverse. In the first phase, Kozana issued hemidrachms—and probably drachms—with Brahmi legends. In the second phase, drachms were issued with Kharosthi legends. In the third phase, he struck drachms, didrachms, and hemidrachms on a reduced weight standard.; The Brahmi legend ran, Kozanasa putra Pāratarāja. The Kharoshthi legend ran, Kozanasa Bagavharnaputrasa Pāratarājasa.
Bhimarjuna		son of Yolatakhma (and perhaps grandson of Arjuna?)	c. 220–235 CE	Along with Arjuna, Bhimarjuna was one of only two Paratarāja rulers to bear an Indian name. His name appears to be a portmanteau of the Mahabharata heroes Bhima and Arjuna.; Bhimarjuna was the last ruler to issue silver coinage; only drachms are known. He employed a new die that, while not directly linked to those of earlier rulers, was stylistically similar to the dies used by Kozana. The reverse always bore a right-facing swastika. His coinage also marks a sharp debasement of the series, from silver to billon and eventually copper.; The coin legend—Bhimarjunasa Yolatakhmaputrasa Pāratarājasa—runs in the Kharoshthi script.
Koziya	Pāratarājas. Koziya. Circa AD 230-270	son of Kozana	c. 235–265 CE	Koziya standing: The meaning of the name remains unknown.; Had the most abundant and complex coinage among all Paratarajas with several innovations—from inscribing names of Kings on the obverse to replacing the bust image with that of a turbanned standing King with a spectre—which would become the mainstay of upcoming rulers.; The coin legend—Koziyasa Kozanaputra Pāratarāja—runs in the Kharoshthi script.
Datarvharna	Pāratarājas. Datarvharna. Circa AD 270-280	son of a Datayola (and perhaps grandson of Bhimarjuna?)	c. 265–280 CE	The meaning of the name cannot be conclusively deciphered; Harry Falk translates to "Glory of the Creator".; Only a few didrachms have been found, which Tandon suspects reflects a short regime and extreme inflation reducing the need for lower denomination coins. The dies were stylistically similar to Koziya's, featuring a right-facing Swastika on the reverse.; The coin legend—Datarvharnasa Datayolaputrasa Pāratarāja—runs in the Kharoshthi script. The nominative Datarvharna is inscribed on the obverse.
Datayola		son of Datarvharna	c. 280–300 CE	The meaning of the name cannot be conclusively deciphered; Harry Falk translates to "Fighter for the Law."; Coins are cruder, and large denomination tetradrachms were introduced, pointing to a weak economy and inflation. Datayola used dies stylistically similar to Datarvharna's (or rather, Koziya's) with both right-facing and left-facing Swastika on the reverse.; A couple of overstrikes on coins of the Kushano-Sasanian ruler Hormizd I (ruled c. 275 to 300) have been observed, providing a terminus post quem of circa 275 and potentially challenging Shapur I's inscription, in which Shapur claims to be ruling Paradan as of 262 CE.; The coin legend—Datayolasa Datarvharnaputrasa Pāratarāja—runs in the Kharoshthi script; some issues make pioneering use of Pāradarāja in place of Pāratarāja, suggesting the identity of the two names Pārata and Pārada. The nominative Datayola is inscribed on the obverse.

=== Overview ===
The frequent invocation of Mithra, a Zoroastrian deity, in the names of the rulers lends support to the view that the Paratarājas originated in the Iranian world. Tandon suggests that they may initially have been Parthian vassals who later asserted their independence amid the weakening of imperial authority and the expansion of Indo-Roman trade.. Little is known about the political history of the dynasty; the available evidence, primarily in the form of extensive coinage, indicates that, for roughly two centuries, the Paratarājas flourished as an intermediary polity between three major powers: the Kushanas to the north, the Western Satraps to the east, and the Sasanians to the west.

Tandon believes their decline may have been linked to the contraction of Indo-Roman trade from the mid-3rd century onward and, subsequently, to the expansion of Sassanian power in the region. He nevertheless rejects the view that they were conquered by the Sasanians as early as 262, as might be inferred from Shapur I's inscription. Parataraja coins continued to be abundant without exhibiting any abrupt Sassanian influence as observed in the case of Bactrian mints, and the region was not claimed as a Sassanian possession in later inscriptions, including Kartir's at Naqsh-e Rajab. (Note: Tandon leaves open the possibility the Paratas might had been nominative vassals.)

== Legacy ==
Coins carrying an inscription of "śrī rājño sāhi vijayapotasya" ("Of the noble Lord, King Vijayapota") on the reverse have been discovered from Loralai; the crescent adorning the brow of the bust on the obverse provides a terminus post quem of c. 400 CE, corresponding to the reign of the Sassanian Emperor, Yazdegerd I. Despite the marked differences in legend and chronology, Tandon notes the continued use of the swastika motif and similar metrological standards, leading him to identify Vijayapota as either a late Paratarāja ruler or the ruler of a successor dynasty that retained nominal independence under Sasanian suzerainty.

== Bibliography ==
- Falk, Harry (2007). "The Names of the Pāratarājas Issuing Coins with Kharoṣṭhī Legends". The Numismatic Chronicle. 167: 171–178. ISSN 0078-2696. JSTOR 42666939.
- Falk, Harry (March 2022). "Revision of Kharoṣṭhī Inscriptions in the Light of New Material". Bulletin of the Asia Institute. 30: 113–142.
- Schindel, Nikolaus (2016). "The Coinages of Paradan and Sind in the Context of Kushan and Kushano-Sasanian Numismatics". In Curtis, Vesta Sarkhosh; Pendleton, Elizabeth J.; Alram, Michael; Daryaee, Touraj (eds.). The Parthian and Early Sasanian Empires: Adaptation and Expansion. Oxbow Books. ISBN 9781785702082.
- Schopen, Gregory (30 June 1996). "The Lay Ownership of Monasteries and the Role of the Monk in Mūlasarvāstivādin Monasticism". Journal of the International Association of Buddhist Studies: 81–126. ISSN 0193-600X.
- Schwartzberg, Joseph E. (1978). A Historical atlas of South Asia. Chicago: University of Chicago Press. ISBN 0226742210. Archived from the original on 27 August 2024.
- Tandon, Pankaj (2006). "New Light on the Pāratarājas". The Numismatic Chronicle. 166: 173–209. ISSN 0078-2696. JSTOR 42666407.
- Tandon, Pankaj (2009). "Further Light on the Pāratarājas: an Absolute Chronology of the Brāhmī and Kharoṣṭhī Series". The Numismatic Chronicle. 169: 137–171. ISSN 0078-2696. JSTOR 42678609.
- Tandon, Pankaj (2012). "The Location and Kings of Pāradān". Studia Iranica. 41 (1): 25–56. doi:10.2143/SI.41.1.2170700. ISSN 1783-1784.
- Tandon, Pankaj (Summer 2020). "Tentative Reading of an unread Parataraja Coin". Journal of the Oriental Numismatic Society (240): 5–7. hdl:2144/42399.
- Tandon, Pankaj (2021). "The Paratarajas" (PDF). In Piper, Wilfried (ed.). Ancient Indian Coins: A Comprehensive Catalogue. Nasik, India: IIRNS Publications. ISBN 9789392280016.
- Wiesehöfer, Josef (2001). Ancient Persia. I.B.Tauris. ISBN 978-1860646751.
