= Paradan =

Province of the Sasanian Empire

- 125–c.650 CE
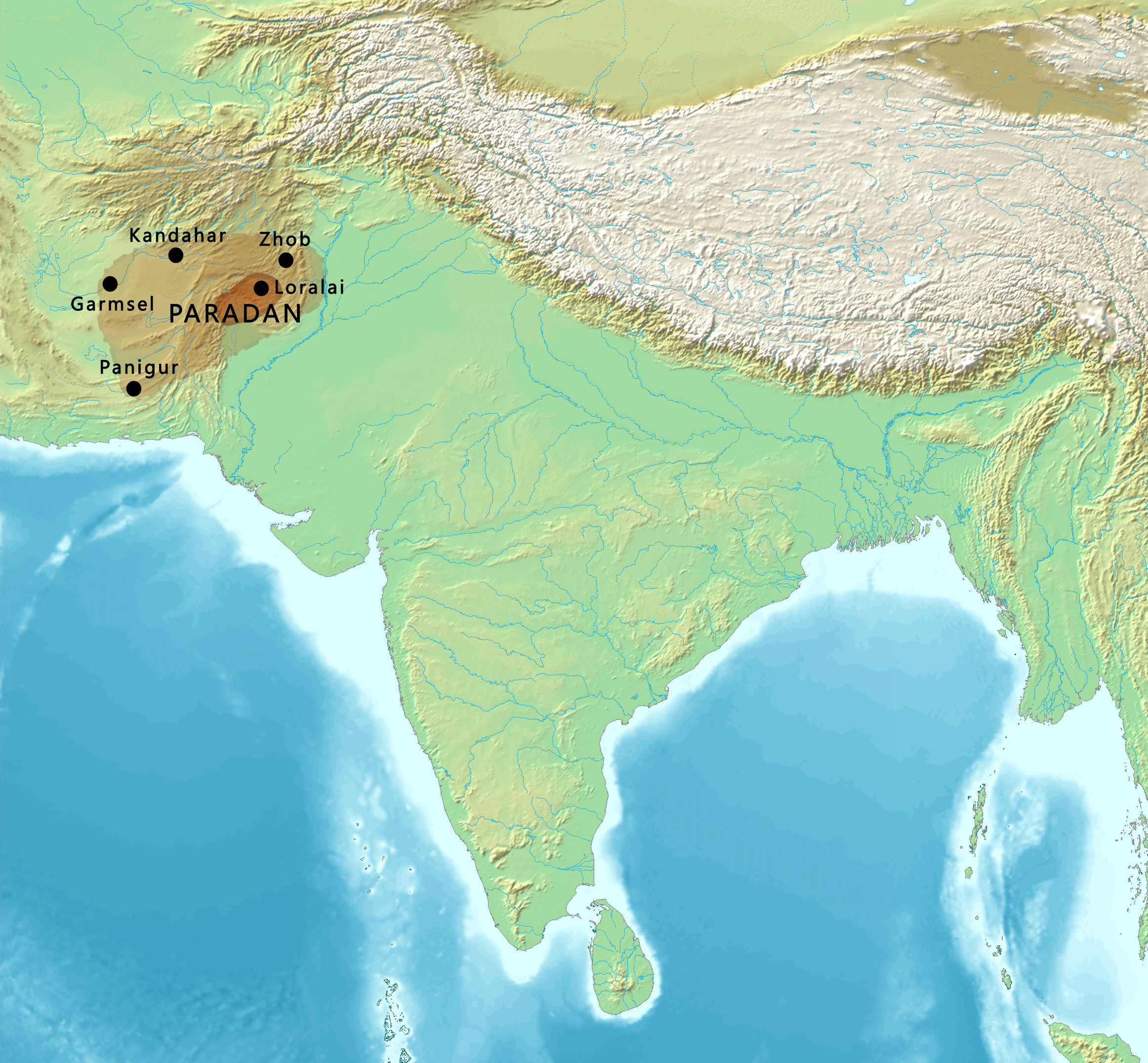
- Core territory and possible maximum extent of Paradan.
- Historical era: Antiquity
  - Established: 125
  - Disestablished: c.650 CE
Preceded by	Succeeded by
Indo-Parthians	Rashidun Caliphate
- Today part of: Afghanistan; Pakistan

Paradan or Paratan was a province of the Paratarajas and the Sasanian Empire. It was constituted from the present-day Balochistan region, which is divided between Iran, Pakistan and Afghanistan.

== Paratarajas ==
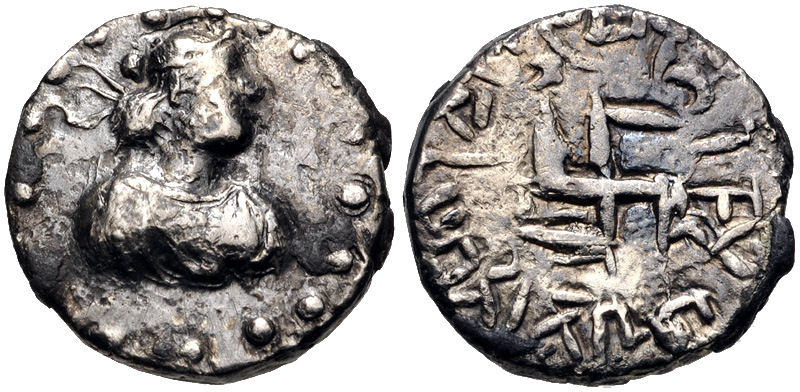
Early Parataraja coinage of Paradan (c.125-150 CE).

Evidence from coins shows that it was located in what is now north-eastern Balochistan, centered around the town of Loralai (now in Pakistan), further east than traditionally thought. Thus it was located roughly where the map places the province of Turan. Paradan has been associated with the territory of the historical Paratarajas (125-300 CE).

== Sasanian Empire ==
The province of Paradan is mentioned in Shapur I's inscription at the Ka'ba-ye Zartosht of 262 CE, one of the many provinces of the Sasanian Empire:

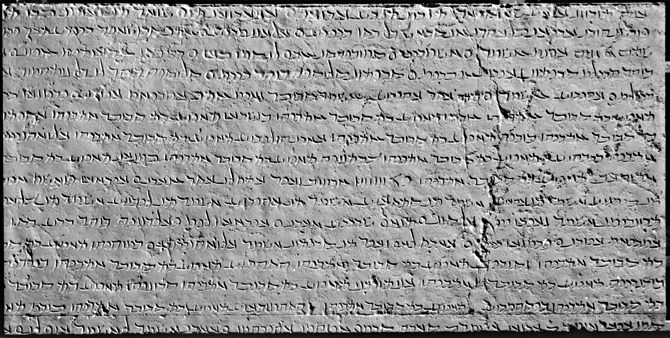
Parthian version of the Shapur I inscription at Ka'ba-ye Zartosht.

"And I (Shapur I) possess the lands: Fars Persis, Pahlav (Parthia) (......) and all of Abarshahr (all the upper (eastern, Parthian) provinces), Kerman (Kirman), Sakastan, Turgistan, Makuran, Pardan (Paradene), Hind (Sind) and Kushanshahr all the way to Pashkibur (Peshawar?) and to the borders of Kashgaria, Sogdia and Chach (Tashkent) and of that sea-coast Mazonshahr (Oman)."

— Shapur I's inscription at the Ka'ba-ye Zartosht (262 CE), translation by Josef Wiesehöfer (1996).

Traditionally, Paradan was held to be further west, in the area of western Balochitan.

Traditional map of the southeastern provinces of the Sasanian Empire, with Paradan to the west.

== See also ==
- Mazun (Sasanian province)
- Gedrosia (satrapy)

== Sources ==
- Brunner, Christopher (1983). "Geographical and Administrative divisions: Settlements and Economy". The Cambridge History of Iran: The Seleucid, Parthian, and Sasanian periods (2). Cambridge: Cambridge University Press. pp. 747–778. ISBN 978-0-521-24693-4.
- Gardner, Iain (2014). Mani at the Court of the Persian Kings: Studies on the Chester Beatty Kephalaia Codex. BRILL. ISBN 9789004282629.
- Tandon, Pankaj. 2012. "The Location and Kings of Paradan" Studia Iranica, 41 pp 25-56. https://people.bu.edu/ptandon/Paradan.pdf
