= Shapur I's inscription at the Ka'ba-ye Zartosht =

Trilingual inscription (c. 262 CE) in Fars province, Iran

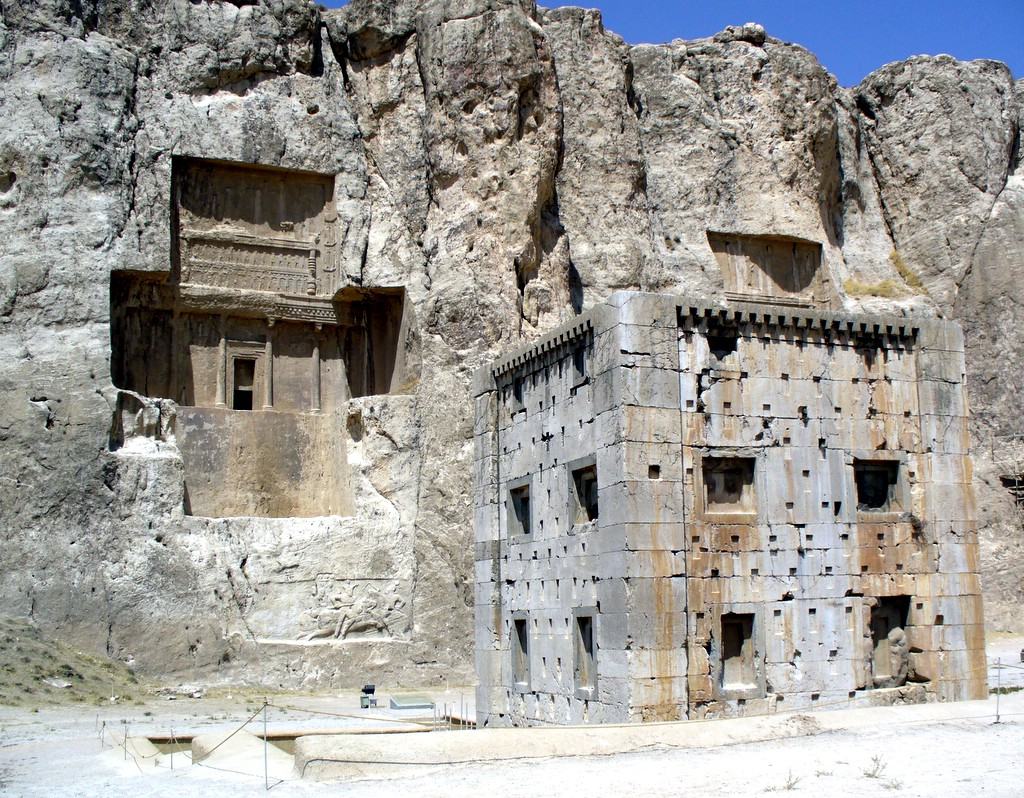
Ka'ba-ye Zartosht

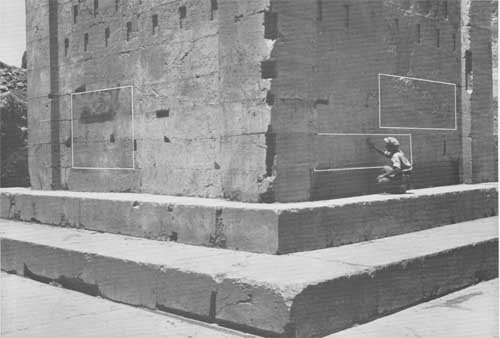
The inscriptions

Shapur I's Ka'ba-ye Zartosht inscription (shortened as Shapur-KZ, ŠKZ, SKZ), also referred to as The Great Inscription of Shapur I, and Res Gestae Divi Saporis (RGDS), is a trilingual inscription made during the reign of the Sasanian Shah Shapur I (r. 240–270) after his victories over the Romans. The inscription is carved on the Ka'ba-ye Zartosht, a stone quadrangular and stepped structure located in Naqsh-e Rostam, an ancient necropolis located northwest of Persepolis, in today's Fars province, Iran. The inscription dates to c. 262. It is the first lengthy inscription by any Sasanian ruler and provides information on Shapur's religious beliefs, lineage, the territories which he ruled and his defeat of the Romans.

== Content ==
The inscription is written in Middle Persian, Parthian, and Greek, containing 35, 30, and 70 lines, respectively. The Middle Persian variant is partially damaged, while the Greek and Parthian versions are better preserved, although they are not exactly the same as the Middle Persian text. In this inscription, Shapur introduces himself, mentions his genealogy, enumerates the provinces of his empire, describes his campaigns against the Roman Empire and talks about the fire temples he built. The inscription is considered the most important inscription from the Sasanian era.

The relevant passage enumerating the territories part of Shapur I's empire :

...[I] am ruler of Ērānshahr, and I possess the lands of [provinces; Greek ethne]: Pars [Persis], Pahlav (Parthia), Huzestan (Khuzestan), Meshan (i.e. Maishan, Mesene), Asorestan (Mesopotamia), Nod-Ardakhshiragan (i.e. Adiabene), Arbayistan, Adurbadagan [i.e. Atropatene, ’twrp'tkn], Armenia [Armin, ’lmny], Iberia [Wiruzān/Wručān, wlwc'n, i.e., K'art'li], Segan [or Machelonia, i.e. Mingrelia], Arran ['ld'nm, i.e., Caucasian Albania], Balasagan, up to the Caucasus mountains [Kafkōf] and the Gates of Albania/of the Alans, and all of the mountain chain of Pareshwar/Padishkwar[gar], Mad (i.e. Media), Gurgan (i.e. Hyrcania), Merv (i.e. Margiana), Harey (i.e. "Aria") and all of Abarshahr, Kirman, Sakastan (Sistan), Turgistan/Turan, Makuran, Pardan/Paradene, Hind [India i.e. Hind (Sasanian province)], the Kushanshahr up to Peshawar/Pashkibur, and up to Kashgar[ia], Sogdiana/Sogdia and to the mountains of Tashkent (Chach), and on the other side of the sea, Oman (i.e. Mazonshahr).

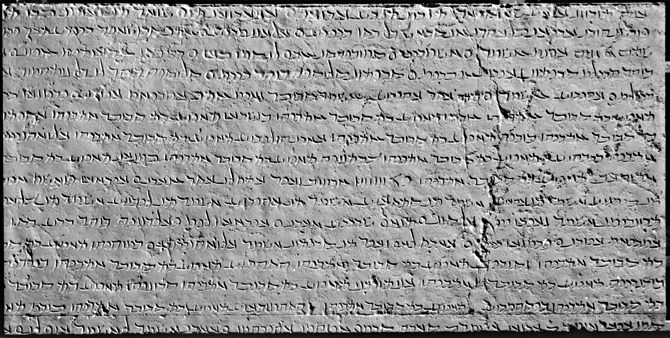
Parthian version of the Shapur I inscription at Ka'ba-ye Zartosht.

In the inscription, Shapur I mentions his victories over Gordian III, Philip the Arab and Valerian. He relates that Gordian departed from Antioch and was killed in a decisive battle at Misiche in 242/4 on the border of Sasanian-ruled Mesopotamia. Shapur mentions that Misiche was subsequently renamed Misiche-Peroz-Shapur, which translates as "Misiche-(where)-Shapur-is-victorious". In relation to Philip the Arab; Shapur mentions that negotiations in 244 resulted in Philip being forced to pay 500,000 denarii to the Sasanians. In addition, the Romans promised that they would surrender Armenia to Shapur. However, Shapur relates that the Philip the Arab did not keep his promise and tried to reinvade Armenia. As a result, another battle was fought in 252-256 at Barbalissos, against a 60,000-strong Roman army. Shapur was victorious, and he mentions that he captured 36 Roman cities. Shapur also mentions his major victory at the Battle of Edessa, which resulted in Valerian being captured by the Sasanian ruler, "along with the Praefectus Praetorio, senators, and chiefs of the army". He furthermore relates that Roman captives were settled in the province of Pars (i.e. Persis). The Oxford Dictionary of Late Antiquity notes that this particular part of the inscription, where Shapur mentions the capture of Valerian and his deeds in general, is reminiscent of the "Persian epic tradition".

In the following part of the inscription, Shapur mentions the Zoroastrian sacred fires he established under his rule to honor each member of the royal family. He also mentions detail of "sacrifices and ceremonies". The final part of the inscription contains valuable content about the Sasanian administration as well as the courtiers and nobles during the lifetimes of Papak, Ardashir I in addition to Shapur I himself.

== See also ==
- Behistun inscription
- List of Sasanian inscriptions

== Sources ==
- Daryaee, Touraj (2018). "Res Gestae Divi Saporis". In Nicholson, Oliver (ed.). The Oxford Dictionary of Late Antiquity. Oxford: Oxford University Press. ISBN 978-0-19-866277-8.
- Full English translation of the inscription in Frye, Richard Nelson (1984). The History of Ancient Iran. C.H.Beck. p. 371. ISBN 978-3-406-09397-5.
- Rapp, Stephen H. (2014). The Sasanian World through Georgian Eyes: Caucasia and the Iranian Commonwealth in Late Antique Georgian Literature. Ashgate Publishing, Ltd. ISBN 978-1472425522.
- Wiesehöfer, Josef (2001). Ancient Persia. I.B.Tauris. ISBN 978-1860646751.
- Yarshater, E. (1983). The Cambridge History of Iran, Volume 3: The Seleucid, Parthian and Sasanid Periods, Part 1. Cambridge: Cambridge University Press. ISBN 978-0521200929.
