= Kushanshahr =

Province of the Sasanian Empire

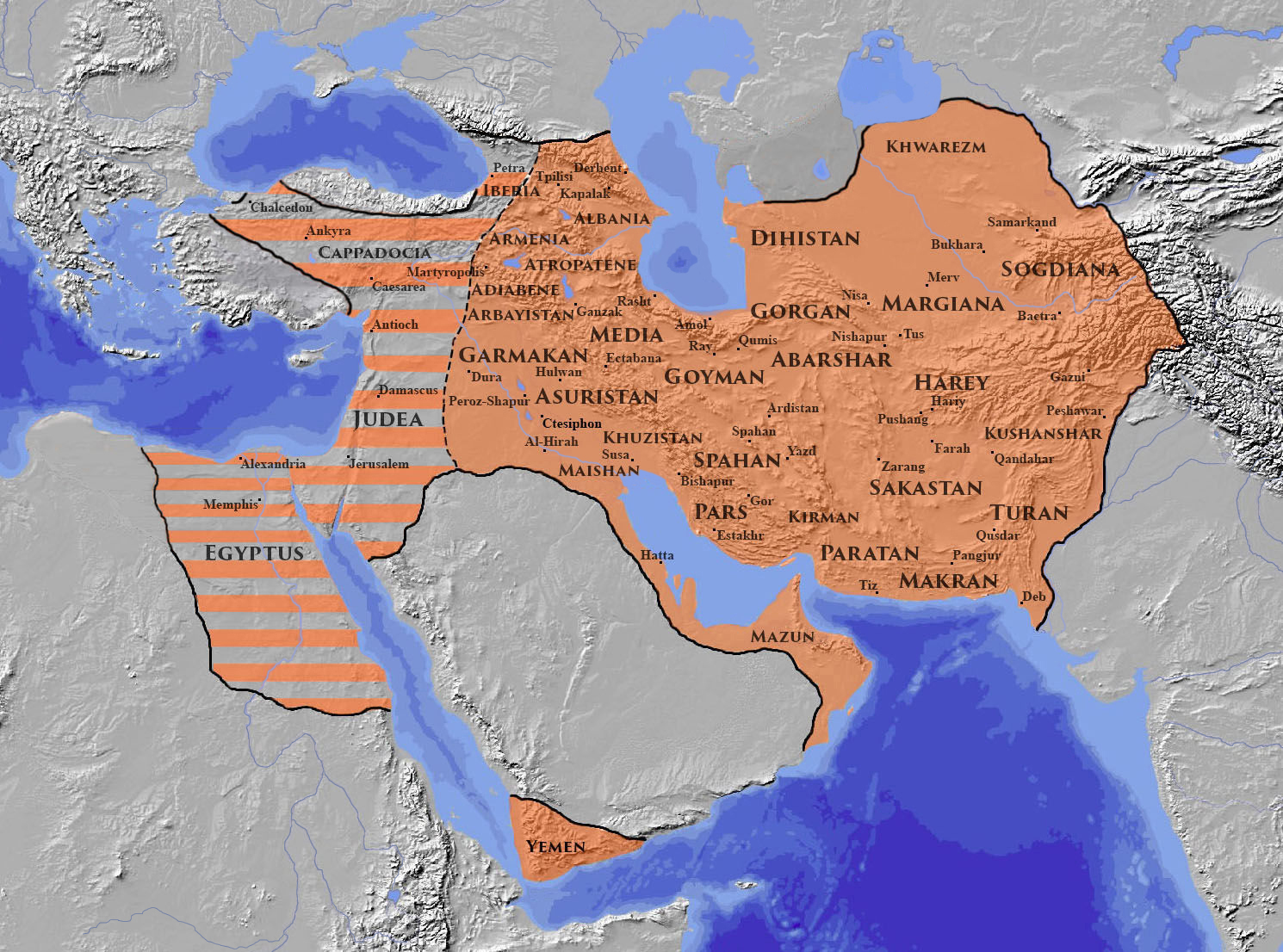
The province of Kushanshar was located at the eastern edge of the Sasanian Empire.

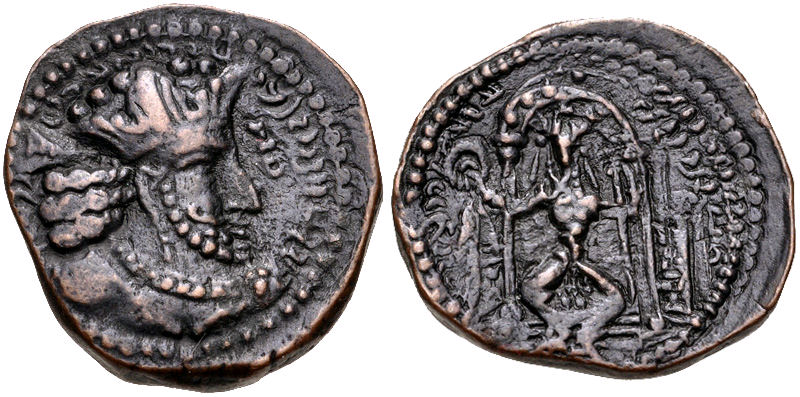
Kushano-Sasanian ruler Ardashir I Kushanshah, circa 230-250 CE. Merv mint.

Kushanshahr was a province of the Sasanian Empire comprising the region between Kabul Valley and Peshawar Valley. The Kushanshar territory centered on Tukharistan, and covered the area from Tirmidh to Peshawar. The establishment of Sasanian rule in Kushanshar permitted the control of Central Asian trade routes. The Kushano-Sasanids were in charge of the area. They issued coinage which was following the Kushan standard, due to the traditional importance of trade links with India.

Kushanshahr was a pendant to Eranshahr to the West, which was the cradle of the Sasanian Empire.

Sasanian rule ended in Kushanshahr when the area was overrun by the Kidarites and then the Hephthalites. .

== Sources ==
- Brunner, Christopher (1983). "Geographical and Administrative divisions: Settlements and Economy". The Cambridge History of Iran: The Seleucid, Parthian, and Sasanian periods (2). Cambridge: Cambridge University Press. pp. 747–778. ISBN 978-0-521-24693-4.
