= Amminapes =

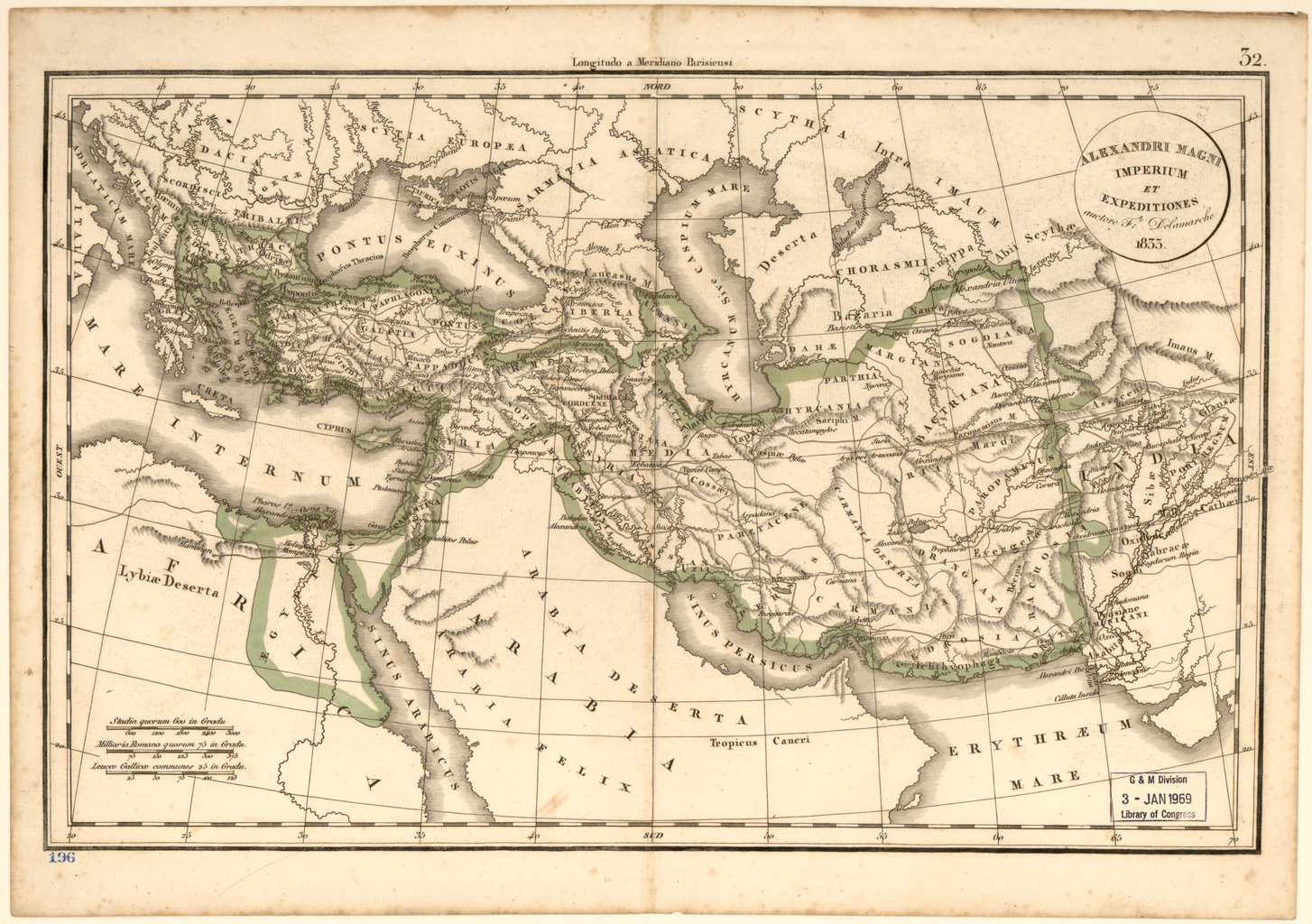
Amminapes received the satrapies of Parthia and Hyrcania from Alexander.

Amminapes was a Parthian who was appointed satrap of the Parthians and Hyrcanii by Alexander the Great in 330 BCE.

Amminapes knew Alexander from his youth at the Macedonian court, where he remained in exile together with Artabazos II and a Persian nobleman named Sisines, after conflicts with the Achaemenid ruler Artaxerxes III. He was later able to return to the Achaemenid Empire and was given responsibilities in Egypt. He was in Egypt with the satrap Mazakes in late 332 BCE when they surrendered the country to Alexander, and he is the one who convinced Mazakes to do so and helped negotiate the terms of the surrender. He then joined the army of Alexander the Great.

Amminapes later received in 330 BCE the satrapy of Parthia and Hyrcania as a reward for his services, but he was still joined with the Macedonian general Tlepolemus. Tlepolemus was later appointed by Alexander satrap of Carmania, which he retained on the death of Alexander in 323 BC, and also at the fresh division of the provinces at Triparadisus in 321.

Amminapes was probably soon replaced by Phrataphernes, who was still in charge of the satrapy in 324, and was then succeeded by his son Pharismanes.
