= Asyncritus of Hyrcania =

Saint Asyncritus of Hyrcania
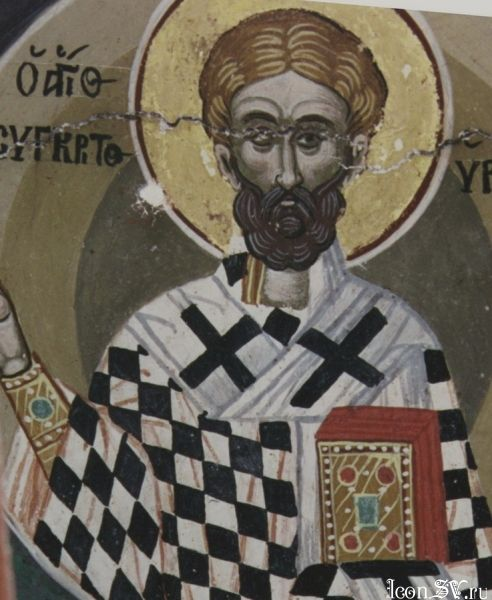

Apostle of the Seventy Bishop of Hyrcania and Hieromartyr
- Born: c. 1st century AD
- Died: c. 50–100 AD; Hyrcanis, Asia, Roman Empire
- Honored in: Eastern Orthodox Church
- Feast: 8 April; 4 January

Asyncritus of Hyrcania, also Asynkritos (Greek: Ἀσύγκριτος, meaning "incomparable"), was numbered among the Seventy Disciples. He was bishop of Hyrcania in Asia. Saint Paul mentions him in his letter to the Romans (cf. 16:14).

The Eastern Orthodox Church remembers St. Asyncritus on 8 April. He is also commemorated on 4 January with the other Seventy Apostles.

== Hymns ==
Troparion (Tone 1)

Let us praise in hymns the six–fold choir of Apostles:
Herodion and Agabus,
Rufus, Asyncritus, Phlegon and holy Hermes.
They ever entreat the Trinity for our souls!

Kontakion (Tone 2)

You became the disciples of Christ
And all-holy Apostles,
O glorious Herodion, Agabus and Rufus,
Asyncritus, Phlegon and Hermes.
Ever entreat the Lord
To grant forgiveness of transgressions
To us who sing your praises.

Kontakion (Tone 4)

Like stars, O holy Apostles,
You illumine the way of the faithful with the light of the Holy Spirit.
You dispel the darkness of error as you gaze on God the Word!

== Sources ==
- St. Nikolai Velimirovic, The Prologue from Ohrid
