= AD 17 Lydia earthquake =

17 AD earthquake in the Roman province of Asia

Coordinates: 38.49°N 28.04°E

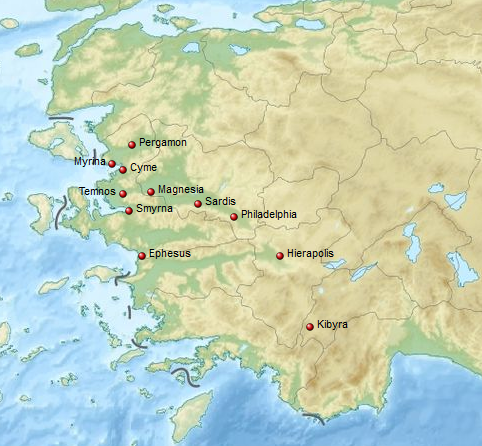
Location of some of the affected towns and cities in Asia Minor

The AD 17 Lydia earthquake caused the destruction of at least twelve cities in the region of Lydia in the Roman province of Asia in Asia Minor (now part of Turkey). The earthquake was recorded by the Roman historians Tacitus and Pliny the Elder, and the Greek historians Strabo and Eusebius. Pliny called it "the greatest earthquake in human memory" (Nat. Hist. 2:86 §200). The city of Sardis, the former capital of the Lydian Empire, was the most affected and never completely recovered from the destruction.

== Damage ==
Historical records list up to fifteen towns and cities that were destroyed or damaged by the earthquake: Sardis, Magnesia, Temnos, Philadelphia, Aegae, Apollonis, Mostene, Hyrkanis, Hierapolis, Myrina, Cyme, Tmolus, Pergamon, Ephesus and Kibyra. Of these, Pergamon, Ephesus and Kibyra are not mentioned by Tacitus. The record of damage at both Ephesus and Kibyra may refer instead to an earthquake in AD 23. In Pergamon the Heroon of Diodoros Pasparos was remodelled after the earthquake.

== Earthquake ==
There are very few extant details for this earthquake. It is known that it occurred during the night, in AD 17 and that it affected a series of cities. A variety of epicenters have been used in catalogues, near Ephesus in the NGDC database, at Sardis in the CFTI4MED database and near Magnesia in the IISEE catalogue.

== Aftermath ==
The Roman Emperor, Tiberius, agreed to waive all taxes due from Sardis and the other cities for a period of five years after the earthquake. He further sent Sardis ten million sesterces and appointed Marcus Ateius, an ex-Praetor, to assess their needs. In recognition of the aid received and the tributes that were waived, twelve of the cities raised a colossal statue in Tiberius' honour in Julius Caesar's Forum in Rome, with each of the cities represented by a recognisable figure. Two additional figures were added later, representing Kibyra and Ephesus as they had also received aid from Tiberius. A copy of this statue, with the figures transferred to a frieze around the base, was erected in Puteoli where it can still be seen.

A statue was raised in Tiberius' honour at Sardis in AD 43, with an inscription calling him the "founder of the city". Another incomplete inscription, found at Sardis, is thought to have been a copy of a formal document from the cities to the emperor expressing their gratitude. The surviving part includes signatories from representatives of eight of the cities.

Commemorative coins were struck in AD 22–23 in Rome, showing Tiberius with the inscription "CIVITATIBVS ASIAE RESTITVTIS" (RPC I.2.48) or "to the cities of Asia restored". Provincial coins were also struck, including one from the city of Magnesia, bearing the inscription "ΤΙΒΕΡΙΟΝ ΣΕΒΑΣΤΟΝ ΚΤΙΣΤΗΝ" or "Tiberius Augustus Founder".

Some of the restored cities changed their names in honour of the emperor. Hieracome became Hierocaesarea, Kibyra added Caesarea after its name, Philadelphia was renamed Neocaesarea, and Sardis added "Caesarea" briefly to its name.

== See also ==
- List of earthquakes in Turkey
- List of historical earthquakes

== Sources ==
- Ramsay, William Mitchell (1904), The Letters to the Seven Churches of Asia, Hodder and Stoughton
- Stillwell, R.; MacDonald, W.; McAlister, M.H.; Holland, Marian (1976). "Kibyra Maior (Horzum (Gölhisar)) Phrygia, Turkey.". The Princeton Encyclopedia of Classical Sites.
