= Agatheira =

Town of ancient Lydia

Coordinates: 38°39′41″N 27°41′00″E

Agatheira was a town of ancient Lydia, inhabited during Hellenistic times. Its site is located near Halitpaşa in Asiatic Turkey. This colony was called a katoikiai, along with Magnesia-by-Sipylus, Hyrcanis, and Thyateira. They were separated from one another by about 15 kilometres (9.3 mi).

Evidence shows that Macedonians settled in Agatheira, such as an inscription at Hyrcanis, which contained insights regarding the settlers' organizational structure. There was also a record that cited Macedonian settlers honoring a certain Seleukos son of Menekrates during the reign of Eumenes II (188–158 BC). This event transpired during a period of "polisification" of the non-polis colonial settlements in west Anatolia.
