= Rufus of Thebes =

1st century Christian apostle and bishop

Saint Rufus of Thebes
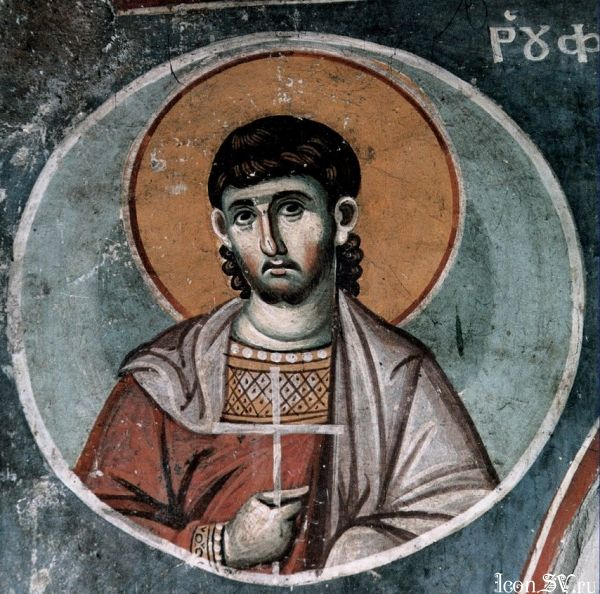

Apostle of the Seventy Bishop of Thebes and Hieromartyr
- Died: 50–100
- Honored in: Eastern Orthodox Church
- Feast: 8 April; 4 January

Rufus of Thebes (Greek: Ῥοῦφος ό Θηβαίος) is numbered among the Seventy Disciples in Eastern Orthodox tradition. He was bishop of Thebes in Greece, and according to some traditions is referenced in Romans 16:13. However, according to Easton's Bible Dictionary the Rufus in Romans 16 could well have been the Rufus mentioned in Mark. His feast day is 8 April, and he is also commemorated on 4 January with the other Seventy Apostles.

== Hymns ==
Troparion (Tone 1)

Let us praise in hymns the six–fold choir of Apostles:
Herodion and Agabus,
Rufus, Asyncritus, Phlegon and holy Hermes.
They ever entreat the Trinity for our souls!

Kontakion (Tone 2)

You became the disciples of Christ
And all-holy Apostles,
O glorious Herodion, Agabus and Rufus,
Asyncritus, Phlegon and Hermes.
Ever entreat the Lord
To grant forgiveness of transgressions
To us who sing your praises.

Kontakion (Tone 4)

Like stars, O holy Apostles,
You illumine the way of the faithful with the light of the Holy Spirit.
You dispel the darkness of error as you gaze on God the Word!

== Sources ==
- St. Nikolai Velimirovic, The Prologue from Ohrid
