= Phlegon =

Phlegon may refer to:

- Phlegon of Marathon, one of the Seventy Disciples
- Phlegon of Tralles, second-century Greek historian
- Phlegon (mythology), one of the four horses of the chariot of the sun-god Helios in Greek mythology
- Phlegon (beetle), a genus in the family Eucnemidae
