= Verkana =

Verkana may refer to:

- Hyrcania: a Greek calque for the ancient Iranian country Verkâna, which occupied an area similar to
- Mazandaran province in modern Iran.

== See also ==
- Gorgan: an Iranian city in the same area with a similar etymology.
