= Hermas of Dalmatia =

Christian saint

Hermes of Dalmatia (Greek: Ἑρμᾶς) is numbered among the Seventy Disciples. He was bishop in Dalmatia.

== Life ==
He is usually identified with the Hermes mentioned by Paul in Romans 16:14, and said to have succeeded Titus as Bishop of Dalmatia. His feast days are celebrated on April 8 with his fellow martyrs, and on January 4 among the Seventy.

(There is another Apostle of the Seventy by the name of Hermas, who was bishop in the Thracian city of Philippopolis).

== Hymns ==
Troparion (Tone 1)

Let us praise in hymns the six–fold choir of Apostles:
Herodion and Agabus,
Rufus, Asyncritus, Phlegon and holy Hermes.
They ever entreat the Trinity for our souls!

Kontakion (Tone 2)

You became the disciples of Christ
And all-holy Apostles,
O glorious Herodion, Agabus and Rufus,
Asyncritus, Phlegon and Hermes.
Ever entreat the Lord
To grant forgiveness of transgressions
To us who sing your praises.

Kontakion (Tone 4)

Like stars, O holy Apostles,
You illumine the way of the faithful with the light of the Holy Spirit.
You dispel the darkness of error as you gaze on God the Word!

== Sources ==
- Nikolai Velimirovic, The Prologue from Ohrid
- This article is derived in whole or in part from Hermas of Dalmatia at OrthodoxWiki, which is dually licensed under CC-By-SA and GFDL. All relevant terms must be followed.
