= Pharismanes =

Hellenistic satrap of the Parthians and Hyrcanii

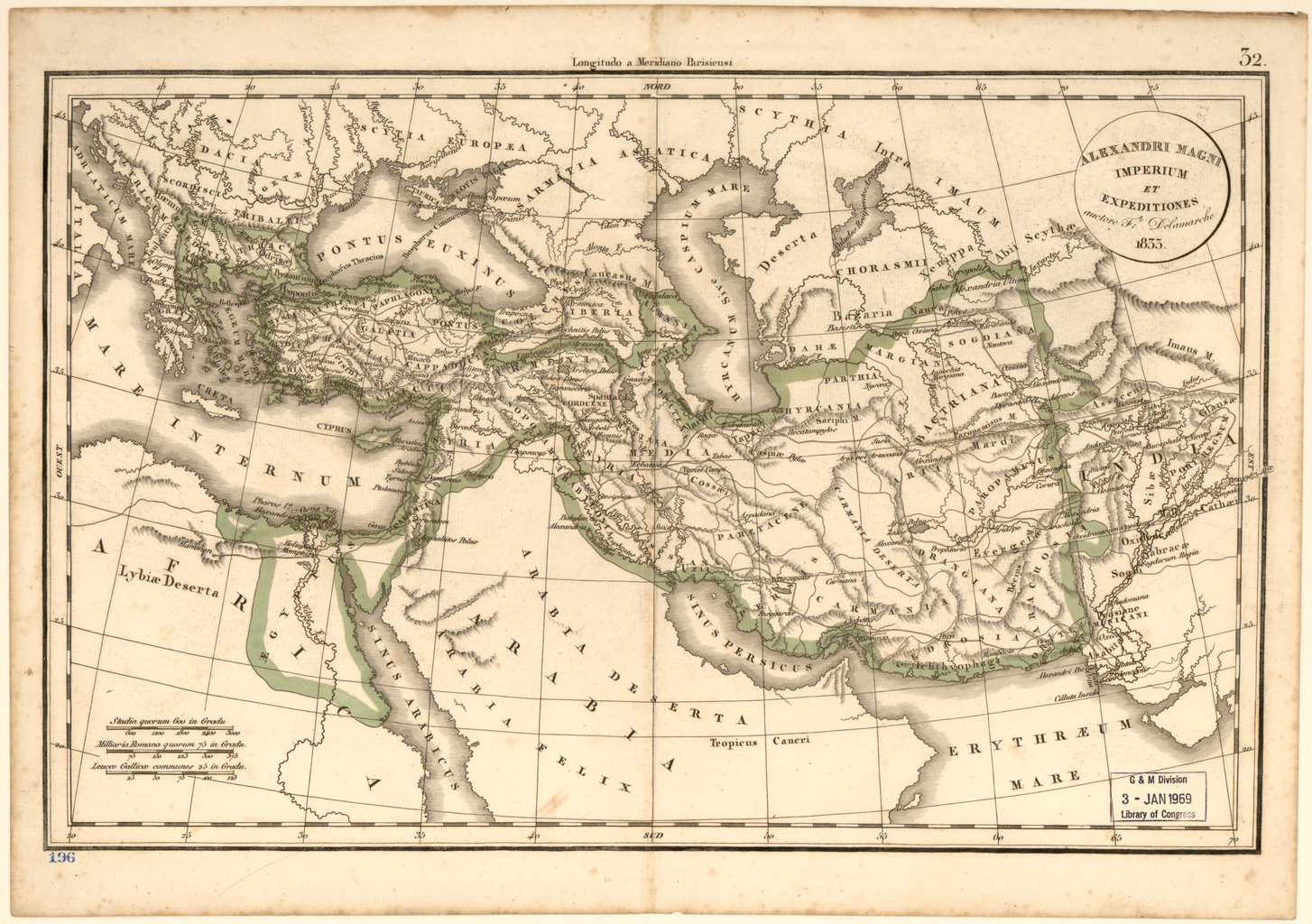
Pharismanes received the satrapies of Parthia and Hyrcania under the Macedonian Empire.

Pharismanes was a Parthian, son of Phrataphernes, who was appointed Hellenistic satrap of the Parthians and Hyrcanii after his father, circa 320 BCE.

After Alexander had crossed the Gedrosian desert in 325 BCE, losing a large part of his army, he was met by Craterus in Carmania in December, who was bringing supplies to relieve the troops. Craterus was also accompanied by several Hellenistic satraps, among them Stasanor, satrap of Aria and Zarangia, and Pharismanes, as satrap of Parthia and Hyrcania. They brought with them herds of horses and camels, having anticipated that Alexander would have lost most of his livestock in the Gedrosian journey.
