= Hyrcani =

Historic tribe of Western Asia

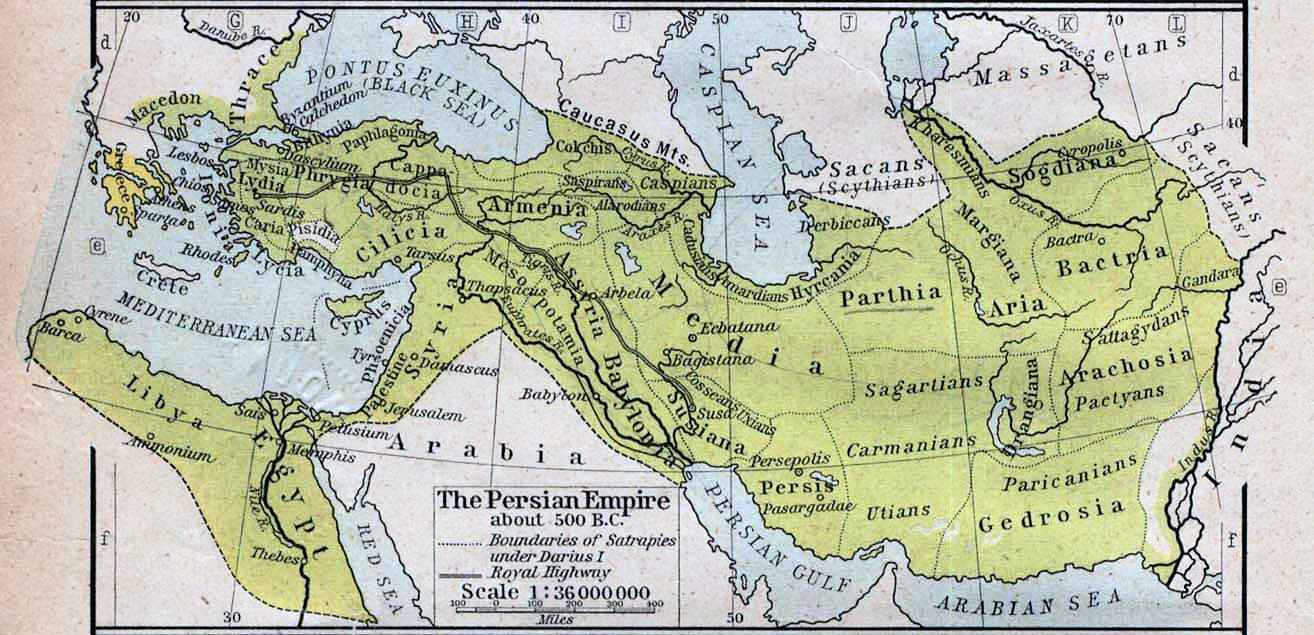
Map of Achaemenid Empire showing Hyrcania and Lydia.

The Hyrcani or Hyrcanians were an ancient Iranian people who inhabited the region of Hyrcania, which included the southern coastline of the Caspian Sea and the Hermos River valley in Lydia.

== History ==
Curtius, Plutarch, Isidore of Charax and Strabo all refer to the inhabitants of Hyrcania on the southern coast of the Caspian Sea as Hyracani. They were one of the peoples encountered by Alexander the Great on his journey, and they sent a delegation to Antoninus Pius.

Jerome and Cicero both comment on their funerary practice, leading to the identification of their religion as Zoroastrian. A reading of Pliny indicates they may have been nomadic.

The Hyracani were also known from the Hermos River valley, of Lydia during the Hellenistic, and Roman Empires. They were often mentioned as one of two tribes, living adjacent to their neighbors the Mosteni. Both tribes are often referred by ancient authors together, but as distinct peoples. Unlike the Hyrcani, the Mosteni were indigenous to Lydia.

The Hyracani had been forcibly settled on the Pidasus river, a tributary of the Hermos River, by Cyrus the Great. Strabo tells us that Cyrus had wanted the Hyracani as a military coloni near the troublesome Ionia. The Caspian, Hyrcani were fearsome warriors, with Aelian (3rd century) telling us they would be accompanied into battle with their hounds.

Pliny and Tacitus tell us that a Macedonian colony was later settled among the Hyrcani. This may explain in part the greater degree of Hellenization in Hyrcani than their neighbors.

The Hyracani appear to have been a rural people, building no cities. Their neighbours the Mostini were to the north and the Mosteni coins indicate they had retained their own culture into the Hellenistic age while the Hyracani were more Hellenised.

We know of three villages of the Hyrcani: Dareeioukaome (Darius village), Ormoita and Tyanolla.

== See also ==
- Hyrcania
- Hyrcanis (Lydia)
- Hyrcania (fortress)
- Hyrcanian forests
