= Phlegon of Marathon =

Phlegon of Marathon (Greek: Φλέγων, meaning "aflaming"; gen.: Φλέγοντος) is numbered among the Seventy Disciples. He was bishop of Marathon in Thrace. He is referenced in Romans 16:14, and his feast day is on April 8.

Phlegon is venerated as saint by Eastern Orthodox Church (April 21 and January 17), Roman Catholic Church (April 8) and other Christian Churches.

== Hymns ==
Troparion (Tone 1)

Let us praise in hymns the six–fold choir of Apostles:
Herodion and Agabus,
Rufus, Asyncritus, Phlegon and holy Hermes.
They ever entreat the Trinity for our souls!

Kontakion (Tone 2)

You became the disciples of Christ
And all-holy Apostles,
O glorious Herodion, Agabus and Rufus,
Asyncritus, Phlegon and Hermes.
Ever entreat the Lord
To grant forgiveness of transgressions
To us who sing your praises.

Kontakion (Tone 4)

Like stars, O holy Apostles,
You illumine the way of the faithful with the light of the Holy Spirit.
You dispel the darkness of error as you gaze on God the Word!

== Sources ==
- St. Nikolai Velimirovic, The Prologue from Ohrid
