= Khandan Castle =

Castle in Gorgan, Iran

Khandan Castle (Qal'a-ye Khandān; Persian: قلعه خندان) dates back to the Sassanid period and subsequent historical eras after Islam. It is located in Gorgan. This site was registered as one of Iran National Heritage List on February 9, 1986, with registration number 1701.

One of the fascinating features of this mysterious historical site is the presence of a secret underground passage connecting the Khandan Castle archaeological site to the city of Astarabad. This passage was used for storing food supplies and other necessities, making it highly useful to the inhabitants of Astarabad in the past.

According to historical documents and archaeological studies, this hill and its castle served as a defensive area in ancient times, with 12 watchtowers surrounding it.

The Castle is located in the southwest of Gorgan, and the French archaeologist Jacques de Morgan visited the hill for the first time in 1896, preparing maps and taking several photographs of the site. In 2009, a team of archaeologists from the Cultural Heritage Organization of Golestan Province conducted excavations to identify architectural layers. The findings included mud bricks measuring 8x38x38 cm from the late Sassanid period, as well as artifacts from the early Islamic centuries up to the Safavid period. This castle was located within the city walls of Astarabad until the Safavid period. After its destruction during the Afsharid era, new city walls were built during the Qajar period, leaving Khandan Castle outside the city.

According to the Encyclopædia Iranica, a more plausible suggestion for the location of the Achaemenid city of Zadracarta seems to be the site of Qalʿa-ye Ḵandān.
