= Pahla =

Historic name of a Parthian region in northern and western Iran

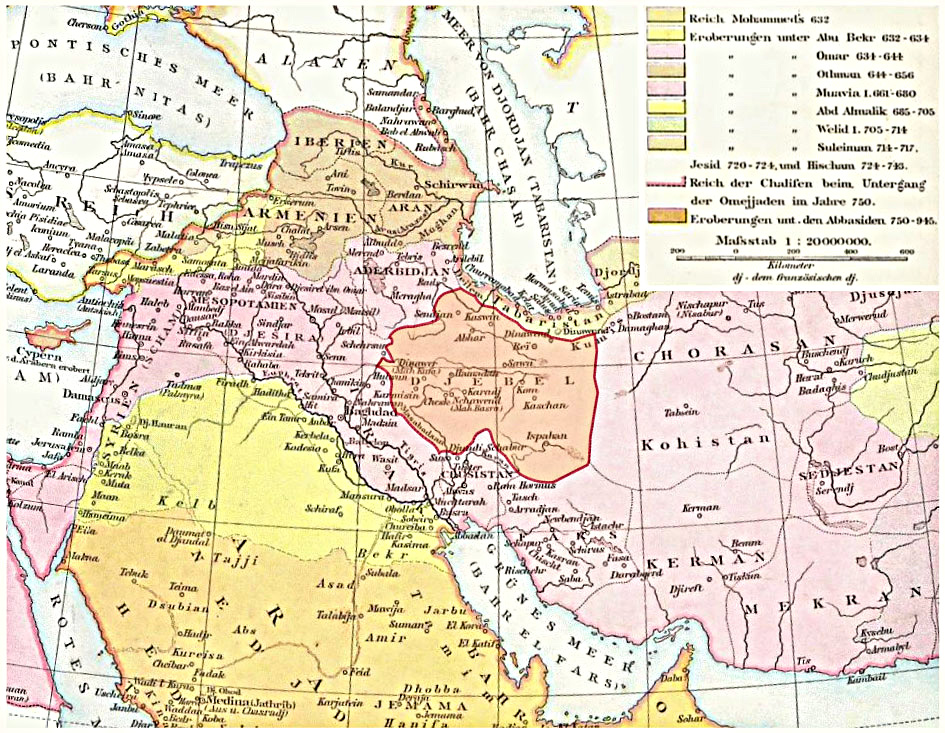
Pahla in Parthian regions

Pahla (Persian: پهله, arabized as Fahla فهله) or Pahlaw (پهلو) refers to the late antique and post-Islamic region of the Parthians in central and western Iran, which corresponds to the early ancient regions of Atropatene (Media Atropatene) and Media Magna.

== Name and Usage ==
The name Pahla comes from the term Pahlav/Pahlaw and thus from Parthav (Old Persian: 𐎱𐎼𐎰𐎺 Parθava; Parthian: 𐭐𐭓𐭕𐭅 Parθaw; Middle Persian: 𐭯𐭫𐭮𐭥𐭡𐭥 Pahlaw).

Over the centuries, the term evolved from a name for the province of Parthava and its population, not only to a name for a people and a culture, but also to an application for the area inhabited by this people. Thus, since the settlement of the Parthians in and the incorporation of Adurpadegan and Media, the migrated or mixed population, but also the area itself, was commonly referred to as Pahla/Pahlaw.

The name "Pahla" as a neo-Iranian form remained relatively unknown to western peoples. Olshausen writes on this matter:

So the name of the Parthians had advanced westward in its neo-Eranian form as a name for a country. However, the change in the name form and its use for the designation of Media, as far as we know, remained unknown to the peoples of the West [...].

— Olshausen 1876: 22

The spread of Parthian identity went hand in hand with a strong loyalty to the order established by Parthian rule:

[...] all the sources that were subject to governors and commanders of Parthian nationality, because of their political or military importance, all their fortified castles, all the quarters of their warriors, were designated by the name of the nation. Each point of this kind was, so to speak, a Parthicum, a Parthia in miniature. The number of such places must necessarily have been large given the extent and political situation of the empire [...]. These are those Pahlavs whose name, even after the time of Parthian rule, remained unchanged in use for politically and militarily important places.

— Olshausen 1876: 23

The use of Pahla/Pahlaw as a testimony of belonging to a national entity or an administrative unit is proven by the fact that the name Pahla can be found in various forms in all settlement areas of the Parthians, such as Partav in Armenia, Parthougim, Pahlu in the Zaza area, Pahleh in Ilam, Barda in Azerbaijan or Bahleh in Urmia. However, the naming of districts in Chuzistan, Spahan, Ray, Hamadan, or Chorasan as Pahla or Pahlu is also evidence of the Parthian tradition, which reports the use of these names as a testimony of belonging to the Parthian administrative unit.

Pahla also entered the usage of many Iranian or even Indo-Aryan and Turkish languages as a military or even legendary title, as Pahlawan. Through Iranian epics and myths, as well as folk legends, the formerly political and cultural title, which was used for the venerable historical Pahlav warriors and governors - probably based on the deeds of these Pahlavs - gained access to literature as Pahlawan. While in pre-Islamic times the name "Pahlawan" may have had a connotation as a member of the Parthian alliance of dynasts, governors, and warriors, it evolved as an epic narrative about these militaristic lords into a synonym for "hero" and an ideal image of a lonely, powerful wandering warrior. The epic narratives in the Shahname about the Pahlawans, as well as the use of the name for specific martial arts such as Zurchaneh and Pehlwani, and the Balochi wandering bards called Pahlawan - which are strikingly reminiscent of the Parthian Gosan culture - are the remnants of a strongly rooted Parthian culture.

== Geographical Location ==
As historical evidence, various historians and contemporary witnesses are used to locate Pahla. It becomes apparent that Pahla appeared as a name for Media during Islamic times until the 12th century:

- Ibn al-Muqaffa': Azerbaijan, Nihawand, Hamadan, Rey, Isfahan
- al-Khwārizmī: Azerbaijan, Nihawand, Hamadan, Rey, Isfahan
- al-Dinawari: Masabadhan, Mihrajangadhaq, Kermanshah, Dinawar, Nihawand, Hamadan, Khanaqin, Mandali, Badra
- Ibn al-Faqih: Masabadhan, Mihrajangadhaq, Kermanshah, Dinawar, Nihawand, Hamadan, Qom
- Ibn Khordadbeh: Masabadhan, Mihrajangadhaq, Dinawar, Nihawand, Hamadan, Qazvin, Rey, Isfahan
- al-Masʿūdī: Azerbaijan, Masabadhan, Dinawar, Nihawand, Hamadan
- Hamza al-Isfahani: Azerbaijan, Nihawand, Hamadan, Rey, Isfahan
- al-Muqaddasi: Masabadhan, Mihrajangadhaq, Dinawar, Nihawand, Hamadan
- Yaqut al-Hamawi: Masabadhan, Mihrajangadhaq, Kermanshah, Dinawar, Nihawand, Hamadan, Qom
- In the Burhan-i Qati (Persian dictionary from the 17th century): Rey, Isfahan, and Dinawar
- Biruni: Isfahan, Rey, and "the other countries of Fahla"
- Shirāzī bin Shahrdār (according to Jāqūt): Hamadan, Masabadhan, Qom, Mah al-Bacra (Nihawand) and Qarmisin

== Fahlawi / Pahlawi ==
Among the aforementioned historians, it is attested that in the region of Pahla (fahla) a common language called fahlawi or fahlavi prevailed:

Most of the Muslim historians who referred to fahla also stated that in this region fahlavi was a common language. Even today, some old poems known as fahlaviyat can still be found in Islamic sources. The available examples mostly come from the areas which were considered to be part of fahlav, such as Nihawand, Avroman, Ray, Isfahan and Qazvin. According to new studies, the available poems in fahlavi reveal the characteristics of oral literature. Thus we may say that the fahlavi poems continued the oral traditions of the Parthian gosans and Sasanian minstrels, following the principles of Middle Iranian prosody.

— Ghodrat-Dizaji 2012: 110-111

Under the term Fahlaviyat, a collection of lyrical texts is understood today, which originate from the region of Pahla. These show clear Parthian influences, but also Old Azerbaijani and Kurdish, or are written in the Persian dialects of the mentioned regions, which have a strong Northwestern Iranian character.

Therefore, Fahlaviyat is to be understood as a collection of poems in the Fahlawi or Pahlawi language, as well as the only remaining example of Parthian language or Parthian dialects with a directly transmitted proper name. That is why Pahlaviyat refers to Parthian literary works from the 9th to the 18th century from the Pahla region. The following reports also testify to this, suggesting, along with the aforementioned historians, a separate language called Fahlawi or Pahlawi as a post-Islamic representative of the Parthian language or a Parthian language variant:

For the city of Zanjan, located in the north of Pahla:

They spoke pure Pahlawi

— Encyclopaedia of Islam, Vol. 11: 447

For the city of Maragha in the northwest of Pahla:

They [...] spoke an Arabized Pahlawi

— Encyclopaedia of Islam, Vol. 6: 498

== History ==
The main settlement area of the Parthians in the early antiquity was the province of Parthava, but with the political and territorial changes during the Arsacid and later the Sasanian period, the demographic situation of ancient Iran changed drastically. Since the Arsacids and the successive conquest of western territories under Mithridates I and Mithridates II, as well as the shift of the main administration to the west, the settlement of Parthians in western Iran is attested.

The expansion of the Parthian people and the Arsacid dynasty to Mesopotamia and the Caucasus required prior settlement of adjacent areas, particularly Media Atropatene and Media Magna. This westward migration of the Parthians was so strong that the history and provincial titles speak of a veritable westward shift of the province of Pahlaw/Parthava. Therefore, it is noteworthy that the history mentions two different provinces called Pahlaw/Parthava.

- Classically attested eastern province Parthava: This province existed since the Achaemenids and was bordered by Gorgan to the northwest, Khwarazm to the north, Sogdiana to the northeast, Balch to the east, Herat to the southeast, and Kerman to the south. Later Sasanian sources no longer mention a province called Parthava in the east, but instead speak of the province of Abarshahr, which means city of the Aparni. Perhaps the original province of the Parthians had become a settlement area of the Aparni due to political events and the proximity to the Dahae-Scythian areas. However, the Arsacids themselves never lost their connection to their original province, as evidenced by the royal tombs in Parthaunisa/Mithradatkert.
- Pahla/Pahlaw in Late Antiquity and Post-Islamic Period: During the Sassanid era, the province of Parthia was newly located in central Iran as a neighboring province of Pars and Khuzistan. As is known, this region was considered the last bastion of the Arsacids. In Shapur's inscriptions, Parthia even shares second place in the list of provinces, indicating its importance for the empire. The Abnun inscriptions also attest to a further westward shift of Parthia, recounting Roman attacks against Pars and Parthia, although these were not directed against eastern Iran. Finally, it is post-Islamic sources that give us a clear picture of the immense spread of the Parthians during the Sassanid era in the northwestern regions of the Sassanid empire. At its greatest extent, Pahla included Tabriz and Ardabil in the north, Masabadhan (Ilam) and Mihrajangadhaq in the southwest, Spahan (Isfahan) in the southeast, and Ray in the northeast, or excluding Ray and Spahan, it encompassed Qumis, Tabaristan, Khorasan, Sistan, Kerman, Makran, Qazwin, Dailam, and Talaqan.

Ghodrat-Dizaji summarizes the historical shift of the province as follows:

To sum up, the province of Parthia in the Achaemenid period included the northeastern parts of Iran. Nevertheless, there is evidence indicating that in the late Arsacid period the term was applied to the central and north-central regions of Iran. Sources from the early Sasanian period categorically demonstrate that Parthia was located in this part of the Iranian plateau. However, Islamic sources reveal that in the late Sasanian period, Parthia now encompassed, in addition, the western part of Iran. In other words, from the Achaemenids to the Sasanians, there was a change in the location of Parthia from northeastern to western Iran. Having considered the evidence and reasons set out above, it can be concluded that, if Middle Parthian has features of the northwestern Iranian languages, this is due to the fact that the Parthian region was located in the northern and western parts of the Iranian plateau during those times.

— Ghodrat-Dizaji 2012: 111

The correspondence of Pahla with the Median provinces can be traced on the one hand to the identification of the governors of these regions with the Parthians. Thus, the regions and governors who were subject to or incorporated into the Parthian Arsacids called themselves subordinate to the Arsacid royal house and Parthians, which, in addition to the political component, also encompasses an identity-cultural component and thus also explains the Parthianization of western territories. On the other hand, the migration of the earlier Parthians to the region played a decisive role in the ethnogenesis of the middle and late Parthians, which is why, in addition to the political component, a strong ethnocultural component is identified by historians.

In Pahla, the rule was not only limited to the Parthian Arsacid dynasty. Moses of Chorene also includes the Karen, Suran, and Aspahbat (Ispahbad) houses as sub-rulers of Pahla. According to Tabari, the Karenids had their seat in Mah Nihavand, the Aspahbad (Ispahbad) in Ray, and the Surenids in Sigistan, while the last Arsacid, Ardawan IV, ruled over the entire Jibal (meaning Media).

== Sources ==
- Alireza Shapur Shahbazi: Sasanian Dynasty. In: Encyclopædia Iranica. online edition, Juli 2005.
- Justus Olshausen: Parthava und Pahlav, Mâda und Mâh, Buchdruckerei der Königl. Akademi der Wissenschaften (G. Vogt), Berlin 1876, Forgotten Books, ISBN 978-1-332-49193-3.
- Mary Boyce: GŌSĀN, in Encyclopædia Iranica, Vol. Xi, Fasc. 2, pp. 167–170; available online at https://iranicaonline.org/articles/gosan (accessed online at 1 May 2023), 2012.
- Mehrdad Ghodrat-Dizaji: Remarks on the Location of the Province of Parthia, in Vesta Sarkhosh Curtis, Elizbaeth J. Pendleton, Michael Alram, Touraj Daryaee: The Parthian and Early Sasanian Empires: Adaptation and Expansion, British Institute of Persian Studies (BIPS), Oxbow books, Oxford & Philadelphia, 2012.
