= Nicanor (Ptolemaic general) =

General

Nicanor (/naɪˈkeɪnər/; Greek: Nικάνωρ Nīkā́nōr) lived in 4th century BC and was a friend and a general for Ptolemy, the son of Lagus, who was dispatched by the Ptolemaic Egyptian king in 320 BC with an army to reduce Syria and Phoenicia. He took Laomedon, the governor of those provinces, prisoner.
