= Apollonis (Lydia) =

Ancient city of Lydia

Coordinates: 38°53′56″N 27°41′05″E

Apollonis (Ancient Greek: Ἀπολλωνίς), also known as Apollonia (Ἀπολλωνία), Apollones (Ἀπολλώνης), and Apollonias (Ἀπολλωνίας), was a city in ancient Lydia. It was located south of Apollonia in Mysia, where there is a ridge of hills, after crossing which the road to Sardis had on the left Thyatira, and on the right Apollonis, which was 300 stadia from Pergamum, and the same distance from Sardis. It was named after the queen Apollonis, the mother of Eumenes II and Attalus II of Pergamum, in the place of an older city; possibly Doidye. It was mentioned by Cicero. It was destroyed in 17 CE by the great earthquake that destroyed twelve cities of Asia Minor. Tiberius rebuilt the city. It issued coins; those from Marcus Aurelius to Severus Alexander are extant. Apollonis is a titular see of the Roman Catholic Church.

The site of Apollonis is located near Palamut Kalesi, Mecidiye, Akhisar.
