= Parthia =

Historical region located in northeastern Iran

Parthia 𐎱𐎼𐎰𐎺
- Historical region of Iran
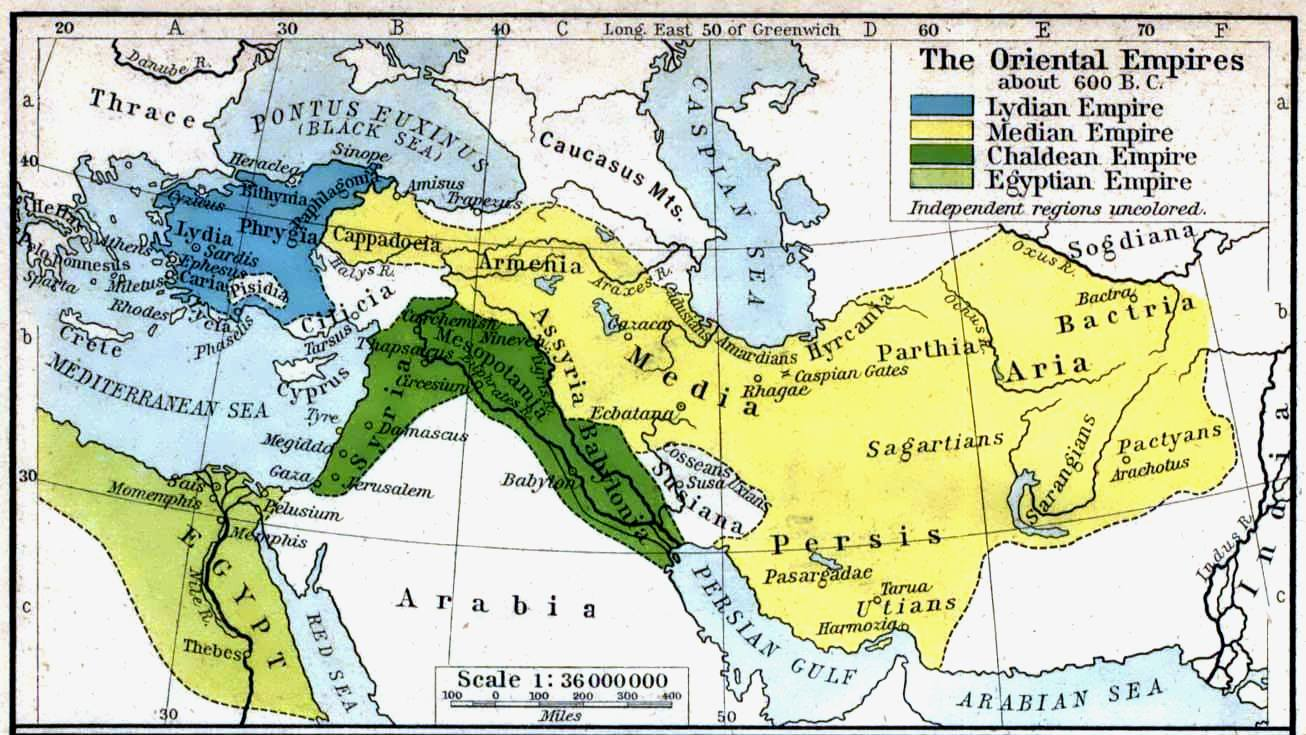
- The region of Parthia within the empire of Medes, c. 600 BC; from a historical atlas illustrated by William Robert Shepherd
- Capital: Nisa
- History
  - Establishment of the Parthian Empire: 247 BC
  - Fall of the Parthian Empire: 224 AD
- Today part of: Iran and Turkmenistan

Parthia (Old Persian: 𐎱𐎼𐎰𐎺 Parθava; Parthian: 𐭐𐭓𐭕𐭅 Parθaw; Middle Persian: 𐭯𐭫𐭮𐭥𐭡𐭥 Pahlaw) is a historical region located in northeastern Greater Iran. It was conquered and subjugated by the empire of the Medes during the 7th century BC, was incorporated into the subsequent Achaemenid Empire under Cyrus the Great in the 6th century BC, and formed part of the Hellenistic Seleucid Empire after the 4th-century BC conquests of Alexander the Great. The region later served as the political and cultural base of the Eastern Iranian Parni people and Arsacid dynasty, rulers of the Parthian Empire (247 BC – 224 AD). The Sasanian Empire, the last state of pre-Islamic Iran, also held the region and maintained the seven Parthian clans as part of their feudal aristocracy.

== Name ==
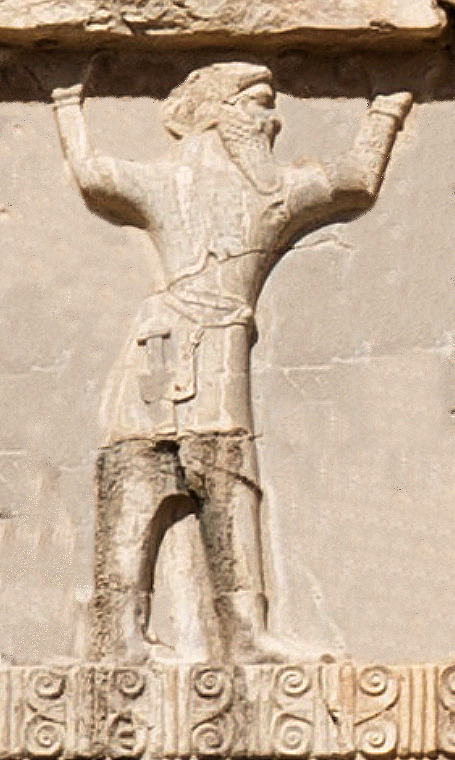
Xerxes I tomb, Parthian soldier circa 470 BCE

The name "Parthia" is a continuation from Latin Parthia, from Old Persian Parthava, which was the Parthian language self-designator signifying "of the Parthians" who were an Iranian people. In context to its Hellenistic period, Parthia also appears as Parthyaea.

Parthia was known as Pahlaw in the Middle Persian sources of the Sasanian period, and Pahla or Fahla by later Islamic authors, but mainly referred to the Parthian region in the West of Iran.

== Geography ==
The original location of Parthia roughly corresponds to a region in northeastern Iran, but part is in southern Turkmenistan. It was bordered by the Kopet Dag mountain range in the north, and the Dasht-e Kavir desert in the south. It bordered Media on the west, Hyrcania on the north west, Margiana on the northeast, and Aria on the east.

During Arsacid times, Parthia was united with Hyrcania as one administrative unit, and that region is therefore often (subject to context) considered a part of Parthia proper.

By the early Sasanian period, Parthia was located in the central part of the Iranian plateau, neighboring Pars to the south, Khuzistan to the south-west, Media to the north-west, the Alborz Mountains to the north, Abarshahr to the north-east, and Kirman to the east. In the late Sasanian era, Parthia came to embrace central and north-central Iran but also extended to the western parts of the plateau as well.

In the Islamic era, Parthia was believed to be located in central and western Iran. Ibn al-Muqaffa considered Parthia as encompassing the regions of Isfahan, Ray, Hamadan, Mah-i Nihawand and Azerbaijan. The same definition is found in the works of al-Khawazmi and Hamza al-Isfahani. Al-Dinawari, while not using the word Parthia, considered Jibal to be the realm of the last Parthian king, Artabanus IV.

== History ==
=== Under the Achaemenids ===
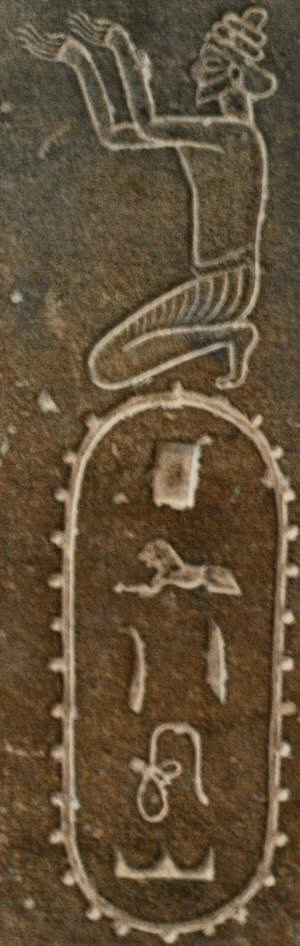
Parthia (𓊪𓃭𓍘𓇋𓍯𓈉, P-rw-t-i-wꜣ), as one of the 24 subjects of the Achaemenid Empire, in the Egyptian Statue of Darius I.

As the region inhabited by Parthians, Parthia first appears as a political entity in Achaemenid lists of governorates ("satrapies") under their dominion. Prior to this, the people of the region seem to have been subjects of the Medes, and 7th century BC Assyrian texts mention a country named Partakka or Partukka (though this "need not have coincided topographically with the later Parthia").

A year after Cyrus the Great's defeat of the Median Astyages, Parthia became one of the first provinces to acknowledge Cyrus as their ruler, "and this allegiance secured Cyrus' eastern flanks and enabled him to conduct the first of his imperial campaigns – against Sardis." According to Greek sources, following the seizure of the Achaemenid throne by Darius I, the Parthians united with the Median king Phraortes to revolt against him. Hystaspes, the Achaemenid governor of the province (said to be father of Darius I), managed to suppress the revolt, which seems to have occurred around 522–521 BC.

The first indigenous Iranian mention of Parthia is in the Behistun inscription of Darius I, where Parthia is listed (in the typical Iranian clockwise order) among the governorates in the vicinity of Drangiana. The inscription dates to c. 520 BC. The center of the administration "may have been at [what would later be known as] Hecatompylus". The Parthians also appear in Herodotus' list of peoples subject to the Achaemenids; the historiographer treats the Parthians, Chorasmians, Sogdians and Areioi as peoples of a single satrapy (the 16th), whose annual tribute to the king he states to be only 300 talents of silver. This "has rightly caused disquiet to modern scholars."

At the Battle of Gaugamela in 331 BC between the forces of Darius III and those of Alexander the Great, one such Parthian unit was commanded by Phrataphernes, who was at the time Achaemenid governor of Parthia. Following the defeat of Darius III, Phrataphernes surrendered his governorate to Alexander when the Macedonian arrived there in the summer of 330 BC. Phrataphernes was reappointed governor by Alexander.

=== Under the Seleucids ===
Following the death of Alexander, in the Partition of Babylon in 323 BC, Phrataphernes, the former governor, retained control of Parthia and became governor of Hyrcania. In 320 BC, at the Partition of Triparadisus, Parthia was reassigned to Philip, former governor of Sogdiana. A few years later, the province was invaded by Peithon, governor of Media Magna, who then attempted to make his brother Eudamus governor. Peithon and Eudamus were driven back, and Parthia remained a governorate in its own right.

In 316 BC, Stasander, a vassal of Seleucus I Nicator and governor of Bactria (and, it seems, also of Aria and Margiana) was appointed governor of Parthia. For the next 60 years, various Seleucids would be appointed governors of the province.

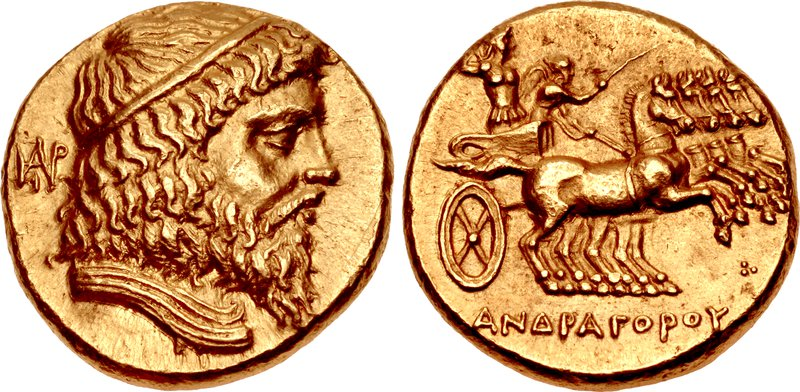
Coin of Andragoras, the last Seleucid satrap of Parthia. He proclaimed independence around 250 BC.

In 247 BC, following the death of Antiochus II, Ptolemy III seized control of the Seleucid capital at Antioch, and "so left the future of the Seleucid dynasty for a moment in question." Taking advantage of the uncertain political situation, Andragoras, the Seleucid governor of Parthia, proclaimed his independence and began minting his own coins.

Meanwhile, "a man called Arsaces, of Scythian or Bactrian origin, [was] elected leader of the Parni", an eastern-Iranian peoples from the Tajen/Tajend River valley, south-east of the Caspian Sea. Following the secession of Parthia from the Seleucid Empire and the resultant loss of Seleucid military support, Andragoras had difficulty in maintaining his borders, and about 238 BC – under the command of "Arsaces and his brother Tiridates" – the Parni invaded Parthia and seized control of Astabene (Astawa), the northern region of that territory, the administrative capital of which was Kabuchan (Kuchan in the vulgate).

A short while later the Parni seized the rest of Parthia from Andragoras, killing him in the process. Although an initial punitive expedition by the Seleucids under Seleucus II was not successful, the Seleucids under Antiochus III recaptured Arsacid controlled territory in 209 BC from Arsaces' (or Tiridates') successor, Arsaces II. Arsaces II sued for peace and accepted vassal status, and it was not until Arsaces II's grandson (or grand-nephew) Phraates I, that the Arsacids/Parni would again begin to assert their independence.

=== Under the Arsacids ===
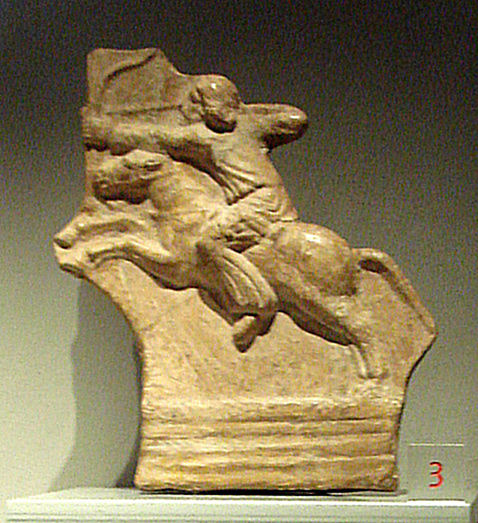
Parthian horseman now on display at the Palazzo Madama, Turin.

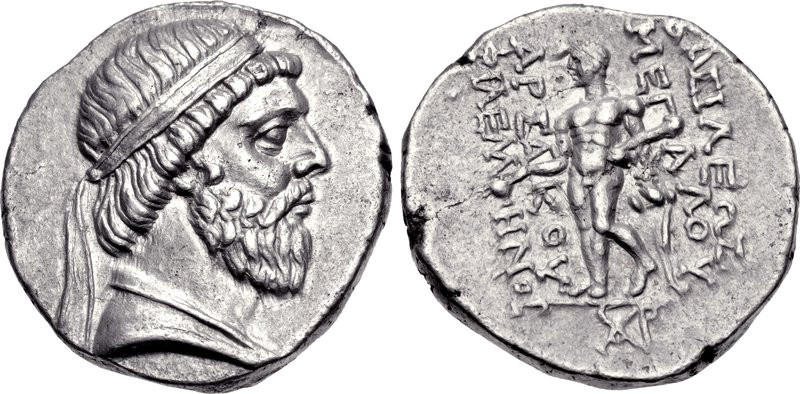
Coin of Mithridates I (R. 171–138 BC). The reverse shows Heracles, and the inscription ΒΑΣΙΛΕΩΣ ΜΕΓΑΛΟΥ ΑΡΣΑΚΟΥ ΦΙΛΕΛΛΗΝΟΣ "Great King Arsaces, friend of Greeks".

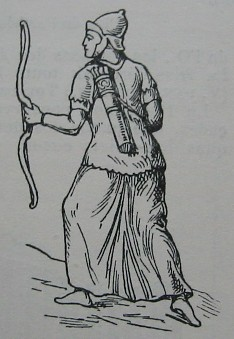
Reproduction of a Parthian archer as depicted on Trajan's Column.

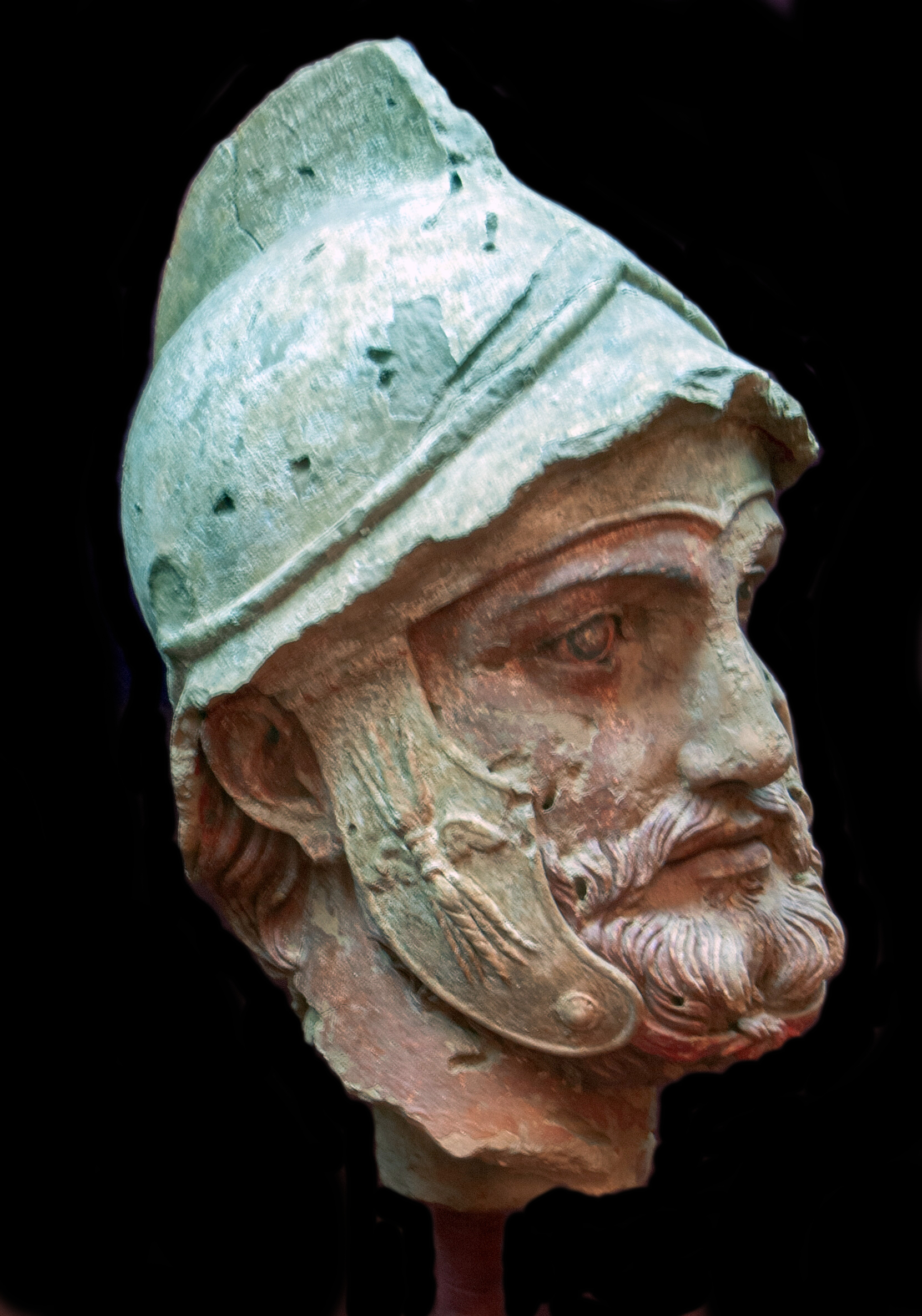
The Nisa helmeted warrior, a Hellenistic figure or deity, from the Parthian royal residence and necropolis of Nisa, Turkmenistan, 2nd century BC

From their base in Parthia, the Arsacid dynasts eventually extended their dominion to include most of Greater Iran. They also quickly established several eponymous branches on the thrones of Armenia, Iberia, and Caucasian Albania. Even though the Arsacids only sporadically had their capital in Parthia, their power base was there, among the Parthian feudal families, upon whose military and financial support the Arsacids depended. In exchange for this support, these families received large tracts of land among the earliest conquered territories adjacent to Parthia, which the Parthian nobility then ruled as provincial rulers. The largest of these city-states were Kuchan, Semnan, Gorgan, Merv, Zabol and Yazd.

From about 105 BC onwards, the power and influence of this handful of Parthian noble families was such that they frequently opposed the monarch, and would eventually be a "contributory factor in the downfall" of the dynasty.

From about 130 BC onwards, Parthia suffered numerous incursions by various nomadic tribes, including the Sakas, the Yuezhi, and the Massagetae. Defending the empire against the nomads cost Phraates II and Artabanus I their lives.

Around 32 BC, civil war broke out when a certain Tiridates rebelled against Phraates IV, probably with the support of the nobility that Phraates had previously persecuted. The revolt was initially successful, but failed by 25 BC. In 9/8, the Parthian nobility succeeded in putting their preferred king on the throne, but Vonones proved to have too tight a budgetary control, so he was usurped in favor of Artabanus II, who seems to have been a non-Arsacid Parthian nobleman. But when Artabanus attempted to consolidate his position (at which he was successful in most instances), he failed to do so in the regions where the Parthian provincial rulers held sway.

By the 2nd century AD, the frequent wars with neighboring Rome and with the nomads, and the infighting among the Parthian nobility had weakened the Arsacids to a point where they could no longer defend their subjugated territories. The empire fractured as vassalaries increasingly claimed independence or were subjugated by others, and the Arsacids were themselves finally vanquished by the Persian Sassanids, a formerly minor vassal from southwestern Iran, in April 224.

=== Under the Sasanians ===
Parthia was likely the first region conquered by Ardashir I after his victory over Artabanus IV, showing the importance of the province to the founder of the Sasanian dynasty. Some of the Parthian nobility continued to resist Sasanian dominion for some time, but most switched their allegiance to the Sasanians very early. Several families that claimed descent from the Parthian noble families became a Sasanian institution known as the "Seven houses", five of which are "in all probability" not Parthian, but contrived genealogies "in order to emphasize the antiquity of their families."

Parthia continued to hold importance throughout the 3rd century. In his Ka'be-ye Zardusht inscription Shapur I lists the province of Parthia in second place after Pars. The Abnun inscription describes the Roman invasion of 243/44 as an attack on Pars and Parthia. Considering the Romans never went further than Mesopotamia, "Pars and Parthia" may stand for the Sasanian Empire itself. Parthia was also the second province chosen for settlement by Roman prisoners of war after the Battle of Edessa in 260.

== Language and literature ==
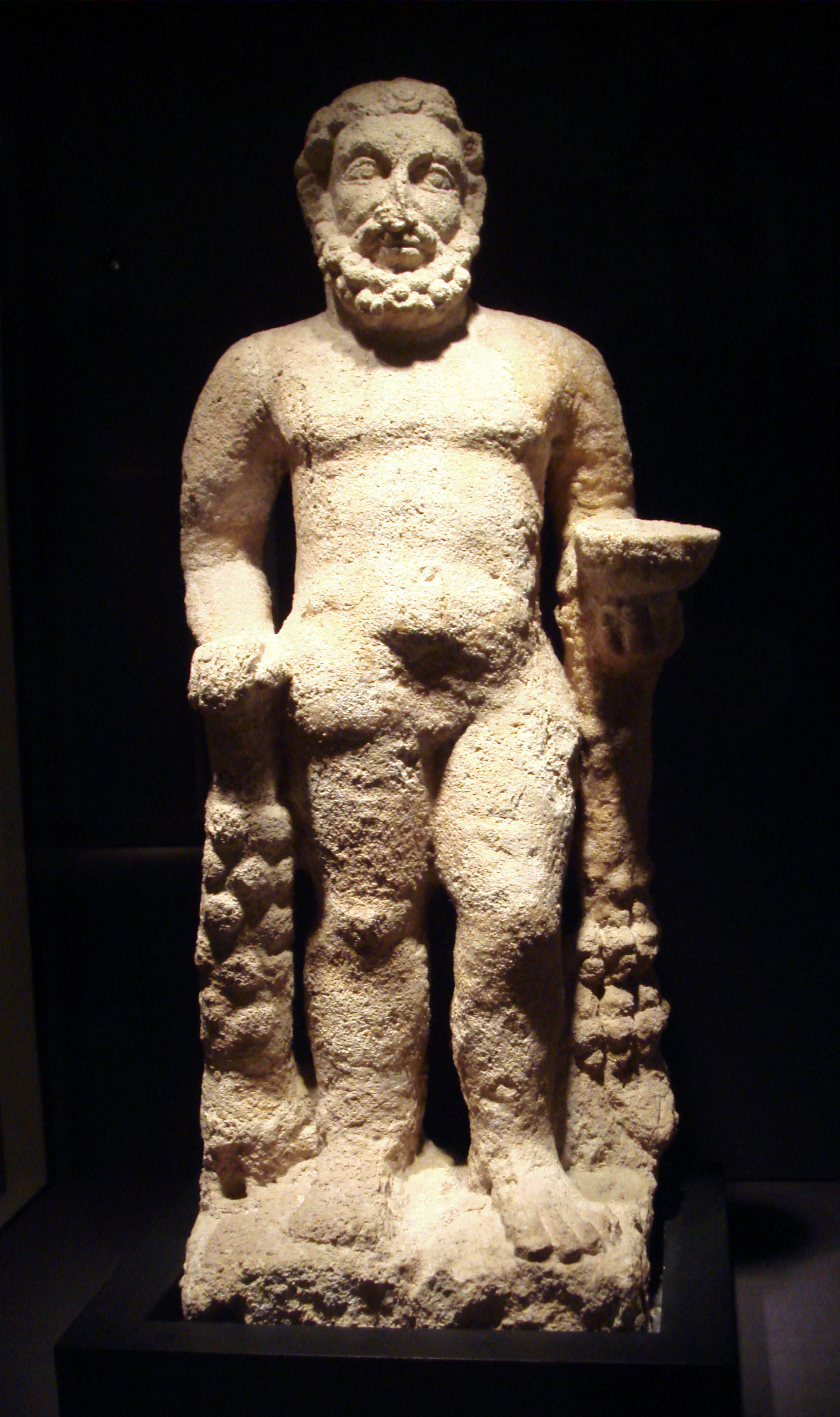
Hercules, Hatra, Iraq, Parthian period, 1st–2nd century AD.

The Parthians spoke Parthian, a northwestern Iranian language. No Parthian literature survives from before the Sassanid period in its original form, and they seem to have written down only very little. The Parthians did, however, have a thriving oral minstrel-poet culture, to the extent that their word for "minstrel" (gosan) survives to this day in many Iranian languages and especially in Armenian (gusan), on which it exercised heavy (especially lexical and vocabulary) influence. These professionals were evident in every facet of Parthian daily life, from cradle to grave, and they were entertainers of kings and commoners alike, proclaiming the worthiness of their patrons through association with mythical heroes and rulers. These Parthian heroic poems, "mainly known through Persian of the lost Middle Persian Xwaday-namag, and notably through Firdausi's Shahnameh, [were] doubtless not yet wholly lost in the Khurasan of [Firdausi's] day."

In Parthia itself, attested use of written Parthian is limited to the nearly three thousand ostraca found (in what seems to have been a wine storage) at Nisa, in present-day Turkmenistan. A handful of other evidence of written Parthian has been found outside Parthia, the most important of these being the part of a land-sale document found at Avroman (in the Kermanshah province of Iran), and more ostraca, graffiti and the fragment of a business letter found at Dura-Europos in present-day Syria.

The Parthian Arsacids do not seem to have used Parthian until relatively late, and the language first appears on Arsacid coinage during the reign of Vologases I (51–58 AD). Evidence that use of Parthian was nonetheless widespread comes from early Sassanid times; the declarations of the early Persian kings were—in addition to their native Middle Persian—also inscribed in Parthian.

The old poems known as fahlaviyat mostly come from the areas which were considered part of Parthia in the Islamic period. These poems have the characteristics of oral literature and may have continued the oral traditions of Parthian minstrels.

== Society ==
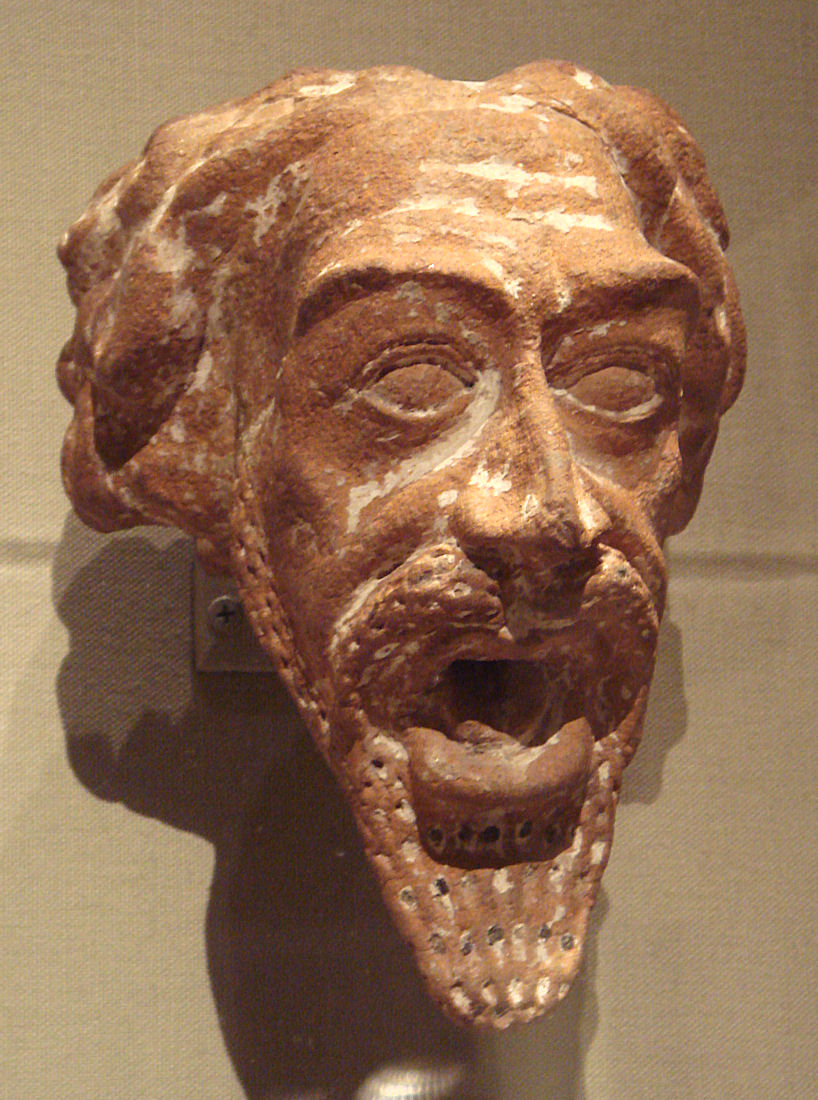
Parthian waterspout, 1st–2nd century AD.

City-states of "some considerable size" existed in Parthia as early as the 1st millennium BC, "and not just from the time of the Achaemenids or Seleucids." However, for the most part, society was rural, and dominated by large landholders with large numbers of serfs, slaves, and other indentured labor at their disposal. Communities with free peasants also existed.

By Arsacid times, Parthian society was divided into the four classes (limited to freemen). At the top were the kings and near family members of the king. These were followed by the lesser nobility and the general priesthood, followed by the mercantile class and lower-ranking civil servants, and with farmers and herdsmen at the bottom.

Little is known of the Parthian economy, but agriculture must have played the most important role in it. Significant trade first occurs with the establishment of the Silk Road (c. 114 BC), when Hecatompylos became an important junction.

== Parthian cities ==
Nisa (Nissa, Nusay) or Mithradātkert, located on a main trade route, was one of the earliest capitals of the Parthian Empire (c. 250 BC). The city is located in the northern foothills of the Kopetdag mountains, 11 miles west of present-day city of Ashgabat (the capital of Turkmenistan). Nisa had a "soaring two-story hall in the Hellenistic Greek style" and temple complexes used by the early Arsacid dynasty. During the reign of Mithridates I of Parthia (c. 171 – 138 BC) it was renamed Mithradatkirt ("fortress of Mithradates").

- Apaveritica (modern day Abivard)
- Asaak
- Ctesiphon
- Hecatompylos (modern day Damghan)
- Merv (modern-day Mary)
- Patigrabana (possibly modern day Tus, Iran)
- Sarigo (modern day Sarakhs)
- Susia
- Susa
- Tabiene (modern day Tabas)
- Zadracarta (modern day Sari)

== See also ==
- Adur Burzen-Mihr
- Greater Khorasan
- Khwarasan
- List of Parthian kings
- Pahla
- Parthian shot
- Vahshuvar

== Sources ==
- Arrian (1884). The Anabasis of Alexander. translated and annotated by E.J. Chinnock. Hodder & Stoughton.
- Bickerman, Elias J. (1983). "The Seleucid Period". In Yarshater, Ehsan (ed.). Cambridge History of Iran. Vol. 3 - The Seleucid, Parthian and Sasanian Periods (part 1). Cambridge University Press. pp. 3–20. ISBN 9780521200929.
- Bivar, Adrian D.H. (1983). "The Political History of Iran under the Arsacids". In Yarshater, Ehsan (ed.). Cambridge History of Iran. Vol. 3 - The Seleucid, Parthian and Sasanian Periods (part 1). Cambridge University Press. pp. 21–99. ISBN 9780521200929.
- Bivar, Adrian D.H. (2017) [2002]. "Gorgan v.: Pre-Islamic History". In Yarshater, Ehsan (ed.). Encyclopædia Iranica (Online ed.). Encyclopædia Iranica Foundation.
- Boyce, Mary (1983). "Parthian writings and literature". In Yarshater, Ehsan (ed.). Cambridge History of Iran. Vol. 3 - The Seleucid, Parthian and Sasanian Periods (part 2). Cambridge University Press. ISBN 9780521246934.
- Cook, J.M. (1985). "The Rise of the Achaemenids and Establishment of their Empire". In Gershevitch, Ilya (ed.). Cambridge History of Iran. Vol. 2 - The Median and Achaemenian Periods. Cambridge University Press. pp. 200–91. ISBN 9780521200912.
- Diakonoff, I.M. (1985). "Media I: The Medes and their Neighbours". In Gershevitch, Ilya (ed.). Cambridge History of Iran. Vol. 2 - The Median and Achaemenian Periods. Cambridge University Press. pp. 36–148. ISBN 9780521200912.
- Diodorus Siculus (1954) [c. 30 BCE]. Bibliotheca Historica. (in twelve volumes) (in Greek and English). Vol. IX (Books XVIII and XIX 1-65). Translated by Russel M. Geer. Harvard University Press.
- Lecoq, Pierre (2013) [1986]. "Aparna". In Yarshater, Ehsan (ed.). Encyclopædia Iranica (Online ed.). Encyclopædia Iranica Foundation.
- Lukonin, Vladimir G. (1983). "Political, Social and Administrative Institutions: Taxes and Trade". In Yarshater, Ehsan (ed.). Cambridge History of Iran. Vol. 3 - The Seleucid, Parthian and Sasanian Periods (part 2). Cambridge University Press. ISBN 9780521246934.
- Mallowan, Max (1985). "Cyrus the Great". In Gershevitch, Ilya (ed.). Cambridge History of Iran. Vol. 2 - The Median and Achaemenian Periods. Cambridge University Press. pp. 392–419. ISBN 9780521200912.
- Sarkhosh Curtis, Vesta (2007). "1 - The Iranian Revival in the Parthian Period". In Sarkhosh Curtis, Vesta; Stewart, Sarah (eds.). The Age of the Parthians. Vol. 2 - The Idea of Iran. I.B. Tauris / SOAS Middle East Institute. ISBN 9781845114060.
- Schippmann, Klaus (2016) [1986]. "Arsacids II: The Arsacid Dynasty". In Yarshater, Ehsan (ed.). Encyclopædia Iranica (Online ed.). Encyclopædia Iranica Foundation.
- Yarshater, Ehsan (2006), "Iran ii. Iranian History: An Overview", Encyclopaedia Iranica, vol. 13, New York: iranica.com.
