= Rufus (biblical figure) =

Son of Simon a Cyrenian

Rufus ("Red") was a first-century Christian mentioned in Mark 15:21 with his brother Alexander, whose father "Simon a Cyrenian" was compelled to help carry the cross on which Jesus Christ was crucified.

"And they compel one Simon a Cyrenian, who passed by, coming out of the country, the father of Alexander and Rufus, to bear his cross."

According to Easton's Bible Dictionary, he was probably the same Rufus mentioned in Romans 16:13, whose mother, were among those to whom Paul sent greetings in his epistle to the Romans; this is speculated to be Rufus of Thebes.

Because the author of Mark likely knew Alexander and Rufus, Simon’s role during the Crucifixion is likely historical memory. Mentioning Alexander and Rufus by name could imply that they would have been known to contemporary readers of the gospel, particularly in Rome where the gospel was likely directed. Mark casts Simon's sons as children of an eyewitness who could affirm their father's testimony, stymieing attempts to cast the passion narrative as a literary invention.

== See also ==
- Rufus of Thebes
