= Mostene =

Populated place in ancient Lydia

Coordinates: 38°30′37″N 27°32′37″E

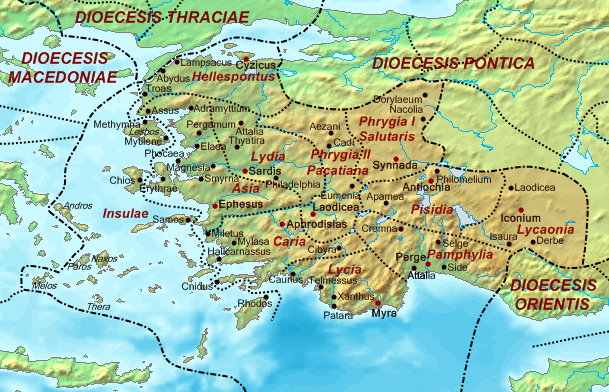
Asia minor 400AD

Mostene (Μοστήνη), also called Mosteni or Mostenoi (Μοστηνοί), or Mostina (Μόστινα), or Mustene or Moustene (Μουστήνη), is a Roman and Byzantine era city in the Hyrcanian plain of ancient Lydia. The town minted its own coin of which many examples exist today. In 17 CE the city was hit by an earthquake and was assisted with relief from Tiberius.

There is debate, based on a line in Tacitus, over whether Mostene was a Macedonian Colony. Cranmer argues for the Macedonian ethnos while Getzel M. Cohen argues for a native Lydian population.

Its site is tentatively located near Sancaklıbozköy in Asiatic Turkey.

Mostene was also the site of a Bishopric. The diocese belonged to the ecclesiastical province of Sardis and remains a titular see of the Roman Catholic Church to this day . The diocese was suffragan of the ecclesiastical province of Sardis under Patriarchate of Constantinople.
