= Hyrcanian plain =

The Hyrcanian plain (Greek: Ὑρκάνιον πεδίον) was a plain near Sardis, the provincial capital of the Achaemenid Persian satrapy (province) of Lydia. Located in the Hermos valley, in what is present-day western Turkey, according to the ancient geographer and historian Strabo, the plain derived its name from a colony of Hyrcanians who were settled there by the Achaemenids. According to the modern historian and archaeologist Nicholas Victor Sekunda, the plain was either "confined to the valley of the Pidasos, or it extended in a broad band along the Phrygios from Thyateira to Magnesia-on-Sipylos to the west, and possibly even as far as Sardis to the southeast".

The centre of worship for the Iranian settlers in the Hyrcanian plain was likely the shrine at Hierakome, located almost at the plain's centre. The shrine was probably founded by the first Achaemenid King Cyrus the Great (r. 559–530 BC).

Sekunda explains that the Hyrcanian cavalry, which fought at the Battle of Granicus against the invading Macedonians led by Alexander the Great (r. 336–323 BC) have often been seen as colonists from the Hyrcanian plain. However, he adds that it is "much more likely" that the cavalry contingent had actually been sent down by King Darius III (r. 336–330 BC) to bolster the Achaemenid defenses in western Asia Minor.

The name Hyrcanis survived into the Hellenistic and Roman-era as a town's name, with its inhabitants being referred to as Makedones Hyrcanioi. It is suggested that the original Hyrcanian colonists were therefore, at some point, dispossessed or made subject to Macedonian military settlers.

== Sources ==
- Raditsa, Leo (1983). "Iranians in Asia Minor". In Yarshater, Ehsan (ed.). The Cambridge History of Iran. Vol. 3(1): The Seleucid, Parthian and Sasanian Periods. Cambridge: Cambridge University Press. ISBN 0-521-20092-X.
- Sekunda, Nicholas Victor (1985). "Achaemenid Colonization in Lydia". Revue des Études Anciennes. 87 (1–2): 7–30. doi:10.3406/rea.1985.5544.
- Weiskopf, Michael (1987). "ASIA MINOR". In Yarshater, Ehsan (ed.). Encyclopædia Iranica. Vol. II/7:ʿArūż–Aśoka IV. London and New York: Routledge & Kegan Paul. pp. 757–764. ISBN 978-0-71009-107-9.
