= Zadracarta =

Exonym for Achamenid city in Hyrcania

Zadracarta (τὰ Ζαδρακάρτα) is a name recorded by Greek historians referring to the largest city of Hyrcania during Achaemenid period. The city was a fortified royal residence.

The precise location of Zadracarta is uncertain. Some identify it with city of Sari. However, according to Encyclopedia Iranica, identification with Khandan Castle (Qal'a-ye Khandān; Persian: قلعه خندان) on the southwest corner of Gorgan is more probable. The latter is a large tepe (mound) of 300 by 220 metres (980 ft × 720 ft) in area and about 40 metres (130 ft) in height.
