= Hyrcania =

Historical region in the south-east of the Caspian sea

Hyrcania Gurgān
- Province of the Median, Achaemenid, Seleucid, Arsacid, and Sasanian Empire
- 548 BC–651 AD
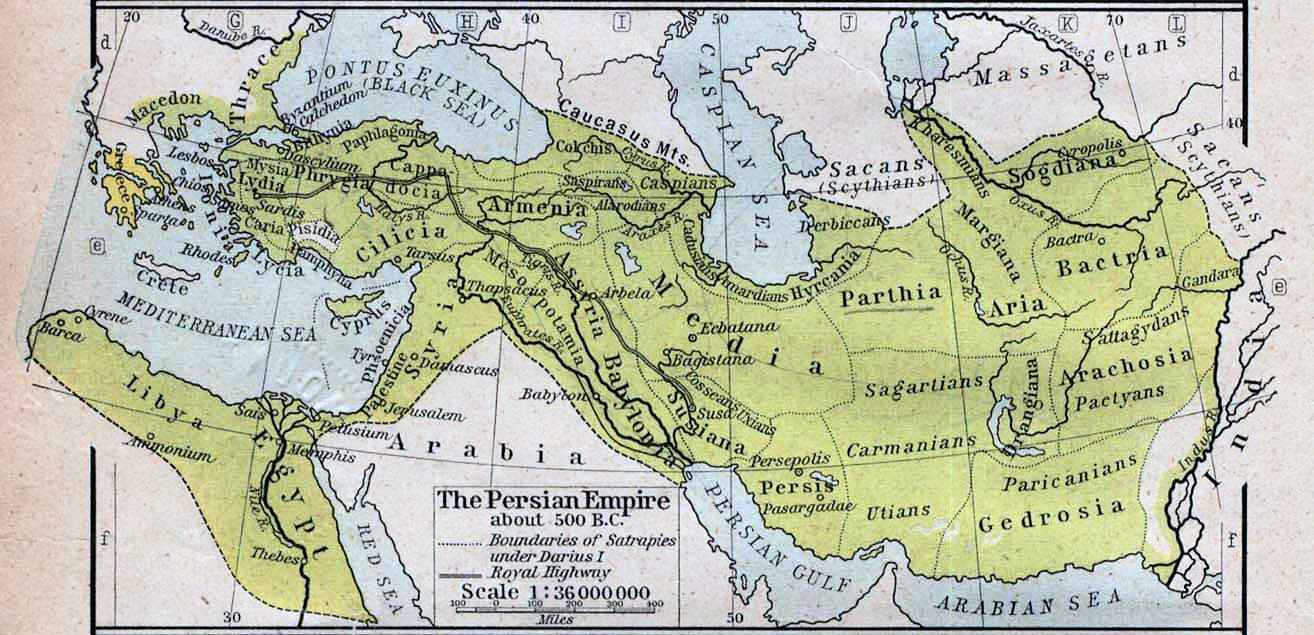
- Achaemenid Empire, with Province of Hyrcania
- Capital: Zadracarta (548 BC–225 AD); Gurgān (225–651 AD)
- Historical era: Antiquity
  - Established: 548 BC
  - Fall of the Sasanian Empire: 651 AD
- Today part of: Iran

Iran National Heritage List
- Official name: Hyrcania
- Type: Archaeological Site
- Designated: 1931
- Reference no.: 41
- Conservation organization: Cultural Heritage, Handicrafts and Tourism Organization of Iran

Hyrcania (/hərˈkeɪniə/; Greek: Ὑρκανία Hyrkanía, Old Persian: 𐎺𐎼𐎣𐎠𐎴 Varkâna, Middle Persian: 𐭢𐭥𐭫𐭢𐭠𐭭 Gurgān, Akkadian: Urqananu) is the historical region of the Hyrcani people composed of the land south-east of the Caspian Sea in modern-day Iran and Turkmenistan, bound in the south by the Alborz mountain range and the Kopet Dag in the east.

The region served as a satrapy (province) of the Median Empire, a sub-province of the Achaemenid Empire, and a province within its successors, the Seleucid, Arsacid and Sasanian empires. Hyrcania bordered Parthia to the east (later known as Abarshahr), Dihistan to the north, Media to the south and Mardia to the west.

== Etymology ==
Hyrcania (Ὑρκανία) is the Greek name for the region, a borrowing from the Old Persian Verkâna as recorded in Darius the Great's Behistun Inscription (522 BC), as well as in other Old Persian cuneiform inscriptions. Verkā means "wolf" in Old Iranian, cf. Avestan vəhrkō, Gilaki and Mazandarani verk/verg, Modern Persian gorg, and Sanskrit vŗka (वृक). Consequently, Hyrcania means "Wolf-land". The name was extended to the Caspian Sea and underlies the name of the city Zadracarta, the then-largest city and the capital of ancient Hyrcania.

Another archaic name, Dahistān (not to be confused with dehestan – a modern Iranian word for "district" or "county") is sometimes used interchangeably with Hyrcania. Dahistān refers, strictly speaking to the "place of the Dahae": an extinct people who lived immediately north of Hyrcania, as early as the 5th century BC.

== History ==
=== Pre-Hellenistic Period ===
Hyrcania formed part of the Median Empire by 600 BC, and according to Nicolaus Damascenus, was administered as a satrapy by the time of the last Median king, Astyages, who appointed a certain Artasyras as satrap (governor). Upon the fall of the Median Empire, the region willingly submitted to the Achaemenid Empire and was occupied by Cyrus the Great in 549-548 BC, and for a time Artasyras continued as satrap under Cyrus, prior to his replacement by Astyages himself. According to Ctesias, Astyages' grandson Megabernes also served as satrap of Hyrcania. Hyrcanians gave their name to the Hyrcanian plain in the middle Hermus valley in Lydia where they were settled, most likely during the reign of Cyrus the Great, as part of a policy to establish military colonies in Asia Minor. Under the Achaemenid Empire, Hyrcania served as a sub-province of the satrapy of Parthia, which was also known as the satrapy of Parthia and Hyrcania. At times, Cadusia may have been administered as part of Hyrcania. Fortifications to protect Hyrcania against nomadic incursions were constructed during the Achaemenid period.

Following Darius the Great's victory over the Magian usurper, Gaumata, in September 522 BC, revolts spread throughout the empire. In December 522 BC, a revolt in support of the Median leader Phraortes erupted in Hyrcania, and in March 521 BC, the Hyrcanian rebels unsuccessfully attacked Hystaspes, satrap of Parthia. In May, Phraortes was defeated and Hyrcania returned to Achaemenid rule. Darius later settled Hyrcanians in the settlement of Dareionkome (Greek: Δαρειονκώμη) in the Hyrcanian Plain in Lydia. Other Hyrcanian settlements in the Hermus valley include Ormoita and Tyanolla. According to Herodotus, Hyrcanian soldiers participated in the Second Persian invasion of Greece in 480 BC under the command of Megapanus. After the war, a garrison composed of Hyrcanian soldiers was posted in the valleys of the rivers Hermus and Caicus. Under Xerxes I, Hyrcania was likely detached from the satrapy of Parthia and administered separately. Some sources imply Hyrcania was later administered as a sub-province of Media. According to Ctesias, Artaxerxes I appointed his illegitimate son Ochus as satrap of Hyrcania in c. 425 BC, who later assumed the throne as Darius II and appointed Idernes as satrap. Idernes' son Terituchmes succeeded him as satrap of Hyrcania following his death and was married to Amestris, daughter of Darius II, but Terituchmes was murdered by Udiastes, a henchman of Terituchmes, for conspiring to murder Amestris and revolt against Darius so he could wed his half-sister Roxana.

By the time of Alexander the Great's invasion of the Achaemenid Empire in 334 BC, Hyrcania was reattached to the satrapy of Parthia and administered as a sub-province. Hyrcanian soldiers are mentioned in the Battle of Gaugamela against Alexander in 331 BC. After the death of Darius III in 330 BC, many Persian noblemen fled to Hyrcania. Alexander reached Hyrcania in 330 BC, where he accepted the surrender of Phrataphernes, satrap of Hyrcania and Parthia, and chiliarch Nabarzanes. Alexander seized Zadracarta, the capital of Hyrcania, hereafter known as Syrinx, later that year and received the surrender of other satraps and nobles. Whilst in Hyrcania, Alexander appointed his general Amminapes as satrap of Hyrcania and Parthia, but was succeeded as satrap of Hyrcania by Autophradates, satrap of Mardia and Tapuria, not long after. In 328 BC, Autophradates rebelled against Alexander and Phrataphernes, who had been reinstated as satrap of Parthia, was sent to quell the revolt. Autophradates was defeated and executed by Alexander at Pasargadae in 324 BC and Phrataphernes was granted the satrapies of Hyrcania, Tapuria, and Mardia.

=== Hellenistic Period ===
Following the death of Alexander the Great in 323 BC, his empire was divided amongst the Diadochi in the Partition of Babylon, which confirmed Phrataphernes' control of Hyrcania and Parthia. The Partition of Triparadisus in 321 BC granted Parthia and Hyrcania to Philip, however, Philip was killed by Peithon, satrap of Media, in 318 BC and Peithon appointed his brother Eudemus as satrap. Eudemus was driven from Parthia and Hyrcania in 317 BC by Peithon, satrap of the Indus, who was subsequently defeated in 315 BC by Antigonus, allowing Antigonus to take control of the Asian territories of the empire. Antigonus appointed Nicanor satrap of Hyrcania and Parthia, also known as the upper satrapies, in 315 BC and continued in this office until his death during the Babylonian War in battle against Seleucus in 310 BC which allowed Seleucus to conquer the eastern territories of the empire and form the Seleucid Empire.

Seleucus' son, Antiochus I, appointed Andragoras as satrap of Parthia and Hyrcania at an unknown date prior to 266 BC, but rebelled against his successor Antiochus II in c. 245 BC. Andragoras may have founded the city of Dehestān during his tenure as satrap. Andragoras was killed in 238 BC during the Parni conquest of Parthia, led by Arsaces, who went on to conquer Hyrcania in 235 BC, thereafter forming part of the Arsacid Empire. Seleucus II attempted to reassert Seleucid control of Hyrcania and Parthia in 231 BC, but was unsuccessful as he was forced to return to Asia Minor to quell unrest.

Following the Battle of Mount Labus in 209 BC, Antiochus III invaded Hyrcania and seized the cities of Tambrax and Syrinx, forcing Arsaces II, who was permitted to continue his rule over Hyrcania and Parthia, to become a vassal of the Seleucid Empire. During the siege of Syrinx, when the wall was breached, the garrison slaughtered the Greek inhabitants and attempted to flee. Arsaces II may have reasserted his independence in 189 BC, following Antiochus' defeat at the hands of the Romans at the Battle of Magnesia in 190 BC. During the reign of Antiochus IV, in the late 2nd century BC, Hyrcania still formed part of the Seleucid Empire. After Mithridates' conquest of Media in 148 BC, Hyrcanians launched an unsuccessful revolt, which was crushed by Mithridates shortly afterwards. Hyrcania served as a royal retreat and Mithridates retired there in 141 BC. In 139 BC, Demetrius II launched an invasion of the Arsacid Empire only to be defeated and captured, following which he was provided a princely residence in Hyrcania and married to Rhodogune, daughter of Mithridates. In 129 BC, the Saka tribes invaded and pillaged Hyrcania, alongside other eastern provinces, and defeated and killed two successive Arsacid kings. Soon after his ascension to the throne in 124 BC, Mithridates II, recovered Hyrcania and re-established Arsacid control.

=== Post-Hellenistic period ===
Artabanus, king of Hyrcania, belonging to a collateral branch of the Arsacid dynasty, led a revolt against the Roman-backed Vonones I in 10 AD and successfully usurped the throne, becoming Artabanus III. Roman interference in the Arsacid Empire resulted in the ascension of Tiridates III in 36 AD, exiling Artabanus III to Hyrcania for a short time. During his exile in Hyrcania, Artabanus III adopted Gotarzes, son of Ardawan, satrap of Hyrcania. Artabanus III retrieved the throne and was succeeded by his son Vardanes I in 38 AD, however, Gotarzes unsuccessfully attempted to usurp the throne and was forced into exile amongst the Dahae. Gotarzes invaded Hyrcania in 46 AD with the support of the Hyrcanians and Dahae to press his claim to the throne, however, upon Gotarzes' discovery of a plot amongst the nobles to remove both Gotarzes and Vardanes I and place another upon the throne, the two brothers made peace. Gotarzes agreed to not press his claim to the throne and was appointed satrap of Hyrcania, only to revolt with the support of a number of nobles and attempt to press his claim once more. Gotarzes was defeated in Hyrcania and forced into exile amongst the Dahae until the death of Vardanes I in 47 AD, thus becoming Gotarzes II.

Under the Arsacid Empire, the Great Wall of Gorgan, a series of forts and outposts with the plains of Hyrcania, was constructed to aid in the defence of Hyrcania against raids undertaken by the neighbouring Dahae tribes. At the beginning of the Roman–Parthian War of 58–63, a rebellion erupted in Hyrcania and rebels sent envoys to Emperor Nero requesting aid. The rebellion raged until 60 AD when Vologases I hastily concluded a peace treaty with the rebels to allow him to deal with the threat posed by the Romans. However, the peace treaty did not last and the Hyrcanians launched another revolt that continued until at least 75 AD. In 75 AD, the Hyrcanian rebels allied with nomadic Alan tribes and granted them safe passage through Hyrcania into Media, allowing the Alans to pillage Media and Armenia. In the time of the reign of the Emperor Antoninus Pius (138–161), Hyrcania had made itself independent and was not considered part of the Arsacid Empire. Hyrcania is mentioned as Li-chien (or Li-kan, 黎幹) in the 2nd century AD Book of Han.

Hyrcania was annexed to the Sasanian Empire in 225 AD by Ardashir I, after which the provincial centre was moved to Gurgān, which lent its name to the province during this period. The House of Aspahbadh, one of the Seven Great Houses, held lands principally within the region. Whilst staying in Hyrcania in 420 AD, Yazdegerd I was assassinated by the nobility who alleged that he had been killed by a white horse that emerged from and disappeared into a stream. The myth propagated by the nobility led people to believe the white horse was an angel sent by Ahura Mazda to end Yazdegerd's tyranny. Gurgān is known to have held a mint as early as the reign of Yazdegerd II. An unsuccessful revolt led by Vahan Amatuni, assistant governor of Armenia, led to his, and other members of the Amatuni noble family, exile in Hyrcania in 451 AD. Priests and other nobles who had led the revolt against Yazdegerd II were also deported to Hyrcania where they stayed until they were moved to the city of New-Shapur in Abarshahr in 453 AD.

During the reign of Peroz I, the Hepthalites invaded Hyrcania and quartered at Gurgan in 465/469 AD. Peroz and his son Kavadh rallied against the Hepthalites and were defeated and captured in battle near Gurgan. At the time of the usurper Bahrām Chōbin's movement eastward into Abarshahr in 591 AD, Hyrcania was governed by the House of Karen, one of the Seven Great Houses. Following the defeat of the usurper Bahrām Chōbin in 591 AD, Khosrow II appointed Vistahm marzban (governor) of Hyrcania as a reward for his support during the rebellion, however, Khosrow's mistrust for Vistahm led him to attempt to execute him by luring him to the royal court. Vistahm was informed of Khosrow's intentions and rose in revolt, conquering much of the eastern provinces of the Sasanian Empire prior to his death and defeat in battle against Smbat Bagratuni in 596 AD. Smbat was rewarded and appointed marzban of Hyrcania, which he served as until 602 AD, during which time the region is known to have prospered.

== Religion ==
Hyrcania, and the rest of Iran in Antiquity, was dominated by Zoroastrianism which was practised by the majority of the population. Christianity and Judaism were also practised in the region, and, Barshabba, the 5th-century AD bishop of Merv, is attributed to the foundation of Christian monasteries in Hyrcania. A diocese of Gurgan of the Church of the East is known to have existed from 424 AD. According to Paulus Orosius, following the suppression of a revolt in Phoenicia and the conquest of Egypt in 343 BC, Artaxerxes III deported Phoenician and Egyptian Jews to Hyrcania as punishment for opposing him. Some Hyrcanian Jews returned to Palestine; however, they maintained a presence within the region as late as the 4th century AD.

== Literary references ==
In Latin literature, Hyrcania is often mentioned in relationship to tigers, which were apparently particularly abundant there during the Classical Age (though extinct in the area since the early 1970s). Virgil, in the Aeneid, had the abandoned Dido accuse Aeneas:

Nec tibi diva parens generis nec Dardanus auctor,
perfide, sed duris genuit te cautibus horrens
Caucasus Hyrcanaeque admorunt ubera tigres. (IV.365-7)

"You had neither a goddess for a parent, nor was Dardanus the author of your race, faithless one, but the horrible Caucasus produced you from hard crags, and Hyrcanian tigers nursed you."

Following its geographical listing by Isidore of Seville in the early 7th century Etymologiae (a standard Mediaeval textbook), the name of Hyrcania became known and taught as far off as Ireland, where it was included in poems such as Cú-cen-máthair by Luccreth moccu Chiara (665 AD), the Auraicept na n-Éces, and Lebor Gabála Érenn (11th century).

Felixmarte de Hircania was a Spanish chivalric romance written in 1556 by Melchor Ortega and referenced by Miguel de Cervantes in Don Quixote.

Hyrcania is mentioned in the short story "Rinconete y Cortadillo" by Miguel de Cervantes, and constitutes one of his exemplary stories which were published in 1613. Cervantes uses this reference to portray the illiteracy of Juliana la Cariharta, a member of Monipodio's guild. She is intending to make reference to Ocaña, a provincial town in Toledo, Spain; but she has misheard it and does not realise the difference.

Shakespeare, relying on his Latin sources, makes repeated references in his plays to the "Hyrcan tiger" (Macbeth, III.iv.1281) or "th' Hyrcanian beast" (Hamlet, II.ii.447) as an emblem of bloodthirsty cruelty. In Henry VI, Part 3, the Duke of York compares Queen Margaret unfavorably to "Tygers of Hyrcania" (I.iv.622) for her inhumanity. Even in Shakespeare's Merchant of Venice, the Prince of Morocco also made references to Hyrcania. He said (an excerpt), "The Hyrcanian deserts and the vasty wilds/Of wild Arabia are as thoroughfares now."

Sir Walter Scott in an epigraph to the thirty-fifth chapter of Ivanhoe refers to "the tiger of the Hyrcanian deserts" as a "lesser [...] risk than [...] the slumbering fire of wild fanaticism" (the epigraph is cited as being written by an anonymous author).

The comic book heroine Red Sonja is described as coming from Hyrkania, an imaginary locale bordering an inland sea based loosely on Hyrcania and set in Robert E. Howard's fictional Hyborian Age. Howard's Conan the Barbarian also has various adventures set in this locale, including as a pirate on the inland sea.

== List of governors ==
Although the below list is incomplete, they are the known governors of Hyrcania.

- Artasyras
- Astyages
- Megabernes
- Ochus (c. 425-423 BC)
- Idernes (423 BC-?)
- Terituchmes
- Phrataphernes (?-330 BC)
- Amminapes (330 BC)
- Autophradates (330-324 BC)
- Phrataphernes (324-321 BC)
- Philip (321-318 BC)
- Eudemus (318-317 BC)
- Nicanor (315-310 BC)
- Andragoras (?-238 BC)
- Artabanus (?-10 AD)
- Ardawan
- Gotarzes (46-47 AD)
- Vistahm (591-596 AD)
- Smbat Bagratuni (596-602 AD)

== See also ==
- Amol, city in Mazandaran province, Iran
- Gilan Province, Iran
- Golestan Province, Iran
- Gonbad-e Kavus, city in Golestan Province, Iran
- Gorgan, Iran, city in Golestan Province
- Hyrcanian forests in Iran and Azerbaidjan
- Mazandaran Province, Iran
- Name of Georgia (country)
- Sari, Iran, city in Mazandaran Province

== Sources ==
- Badian, Ernst (2015). "PHRATAPHERNES". Encyclopaedia Iranica.
- Bivar, A. D. H. (2002). "GORGĀN v. Pre-Islamic history". Encyclopaedia Iranica.
- Boyce, Mary; Grenet, Frantz; Beck, Roger (1991). A History of Zoroastrianism: Zoroastrianism under Macedonian and Roman rule. Vol. 3.
- Boyce, Mary; Bivar, A. D. H.; Shahbazi, A. Shapur (2001). "GŌDARZ". Encyclopaedia Iranica.
- Bruce, Frederick Fyvie (1990). The Acts of the Apostles: The Greek Text with Introduction and Commentary.
- Brunner, C. J. (2004). "IRAN v. PEOPLES OF IRAN (2) Pre-Islamic". Encyclopaedia Iranica.
- Chabot, Jean-Baptiste (1902). Synodicon orientale ou recueil de synodes nestoriens (PDF). Paris: Imprimerie Nationale.
- Choksy, Jamsheed K. (2015). "ZOROASTRIANISM ii. Historical Review: from the Arab Conquest to Modern Times". Encyclopaedia Iranica.
- Dandamayev, M. A. (1986). "ARTASYRAS". Encyclopaedia Iranica.
- Dandamayev, M. A. (1987). "AUTOPHRADATES". Encyclopaedia Iranica.
- Dandamayev, M. A. (1993). "CYRUS iii. Cyrus II The Great". Encyclopaedia Iranica.
- Debevoise, Neilson Carel (1938). A Political History of Parthia. Literary Licensing, LLC. ISBN 9781258469610.
- Frye, Richard N. (1963). The Heritage of Persia: The pre-Islamic History of One of the World's Great Civilizations.
- Frye, Richard N. (1983). The History of Ancient Iran.
- Frye, Richard N. (1985). "ANDRAGORAS". Encyclopaedia Iranica.
- Garsoian, N. (2005). "SMBAT BAGRATUNI". Encyclopaedia Iranica.
- Jacobs, Bruno (2006). "ACHAEMENID SATRAPIES". Encyclopaedia Iranica.
- Jakubiak, Krzysztof (2008). "ARSACIDS viii. Military Architecture Of Parthia". Encyclopaedia Iranica.
- Kiani, Muhammad Yusof (2002). "GORGĀN iv. Archeology". Encyclopaedia Iranica.
- Lendering, Jona (1996). "Hyrcania". Livius.
- Lendering, Jona (1999). "Peithon (1)". Livius.
- Lendering, Jona (2000). "Phraortes". Livius.
- Lendering, Jona (2002). "Nicanor". Livius.
- Lendering, Jona (2004). "Amminapes". Livius.
- Lendering, Jona (2005). "Wall of Alexander". Livius.
- Nasrollahzadeh, Cyrus (2011). "Inscriptional Literature: A Review of Parthian Inscription of Sare Pol-e Zohab". Journal of Language Researches. 2. Archived from the original on 2016-12-31.
- Perry, John R.; Shahbazi, A. Shapur; Kettenhofen, Erich (1994). "DEPORTATIONS". Encyclopaedia Iranica.
- Pourshariati, Parvaneh (2008). Decline and Fall of the Sasanian Empire: The Sasanian-Parthian Confederacy and the Arab Conquest of Iran. Bloomsbury Academic. ISBN 9781845116453.
- Pulleyblank, Edwin G. (1991). "CH'IEN HAN SHU". Encyclopaedia Iranica.
- Ramsay, W. M. (1890). The Historical Geography of Asia Minor. Cambridge University Press. ISBN 9781108014533.
- Rawlinson, George (1867). The Seven Great Monarchies Of The Ancient Eastern World, Vol 5: Persia.
- Rawlinson, George (1873). The Seven Great Monarchies Of The Ancient Eastern World, Vol 6: Parthia.
- Sarshar, Houman (2014). The Jews of Iran: The History, Religion and Culture of a Community in the Islamic World. Bloomsbury Academic. ISBN 9781780768885.
- Schippmann, K. (1986). "ARSACIDS ii. The Arsacid dynasty". Encyclopaedia Iranica.
- Schippmann, K. (1999). "FĪRŪZ". Encyclopaedia Iranica.
- Schmitt, Rüdiger (1990). "CADUSII". Encyclopaedia Iranica.
- Shahbazi, A. Shapur (1989). "BESṬĀM O BENDŌY". BESṬĀM O BENDŌY – Encyclopaedia Iranica. Encyclopaedia Iranica. Archived from the original on 2013-09-22.
- Shahbazi, A. Shapur (2003). "YAZDEGERD I". Encyclopaedia Iranica.
- Shakespeare, William (2013). Bevington, David (ed.). Henry VI, Part 3. Archived from the original on 2016-12-31.
- Sherwin-White, Susan M.; Kuhrt, Amélie (1993). From Samarkhand to Sardis: A New Approach to the Seleucid Empire. University of California Press. ISBN 9780520081833.
- Sims-Williams, N. (1988). "BARŠABBĀ". Encyclopaedia Iranica.
- Strootman, Rolf (2015). "SELEUCID EMPIRE". Encyclopaedia Iranica.
- Tacitus (1876). Alfred John Church and William Jackson Brodribb, ed. Annals.
- Toumanoff, C. (1988). "BAGRATIDS". Encyclopaedia Iranica.
- Toumanoff, C. (1989). "AMATUNI". Encyclopaedia Iranica.
- Verstandig, A. (2001). Histoire de L'Empire Parthe (-250-227).
- Walbank, Frank W. (2015). "Alexander the Great". Encyclopædia Britannica.
- Woodhouse, S. C. (1910). English-Greek Dictionary: A Vocabulary of the Attic Language. Archived from the original on 2021-02-24.
- Yarshater, E. (1983). "Introduction". The Cambridge History of Iran: The Seleucid, Parthian, and Sasanian periods (1). Cambridge University Press. ISBN 9780521200929.
