= Pièrre Lecoq =

Belgian academic

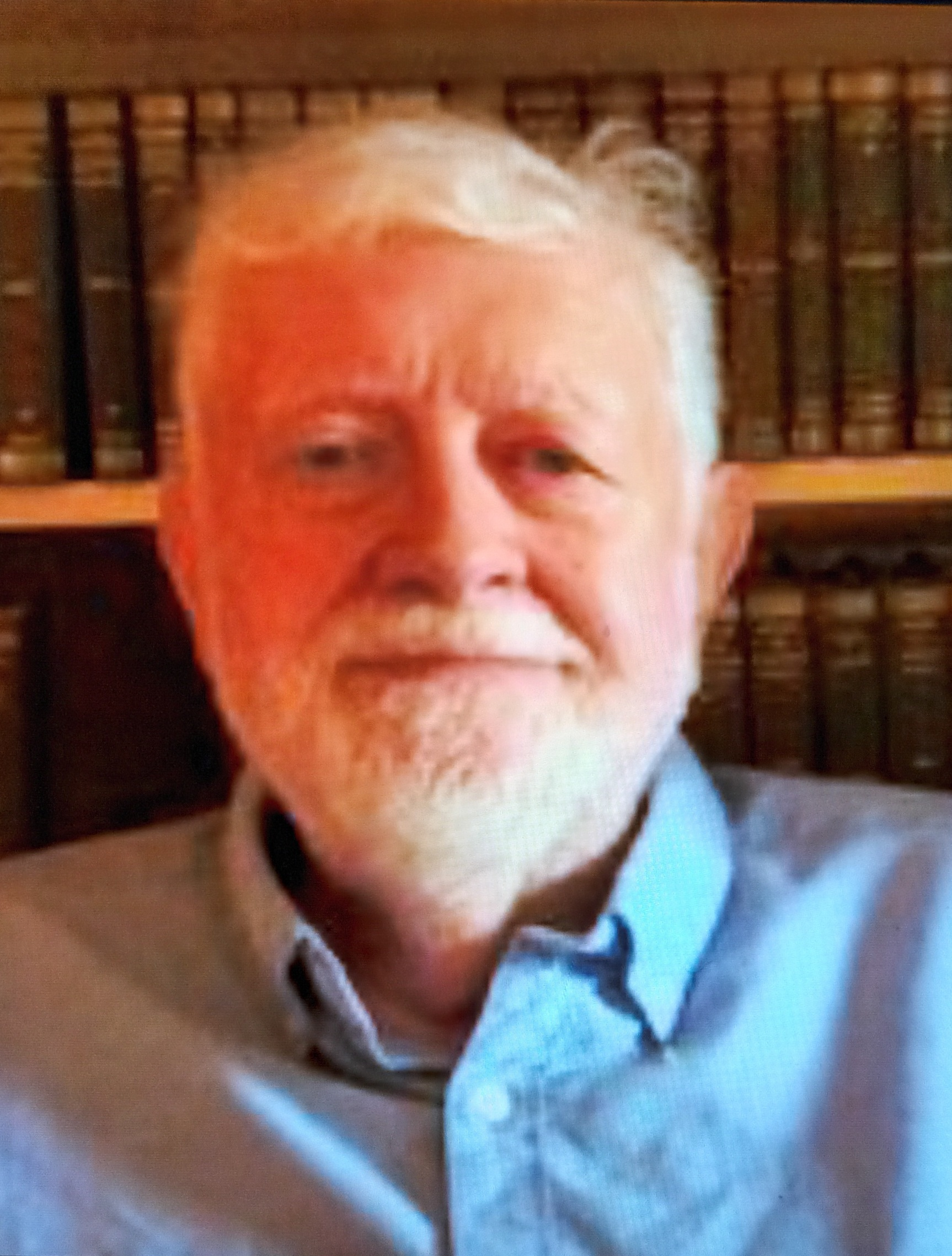
Pierre Lecoq

Pièrre Lecoq (born 1939) is a Belgian philologist, historian, and Iranologist.

Born in 1939, Pierre Lecoq is a linguist and philologist trained by Jacques Duchesne-Guillemin at the University of Liège. Lecoq first devoted his work to ancient Iranian languages, mainly to Avestan philology and Old Persian epigraphy. His diachronic approach to Iranian languages, enriched by his in-depth knowledge of Indo-Iranian and Middle Iranian languages, as well as his studies on the historical phonology and paleography of Old Persian cuneiform, have resulted in the presentation of a full translation of Achaemenid inscriptions (2020), in which he incorporated the parallel versions in Elamite and Babylonian. Lecoq's French translation of the Avesta (Paris, 2016) is among his major recent works.

In the field of Iranian dialectology, Lecoq has published widely on living Iranian languages. This includes a description of the Sivandi language spoken in Fars (1979) and a voluminous study on the dialects spoken in ancient Carmania, which he names Kermanian dialects (2002). Lecoq has also made a hypothesis on the initial habitat of the Kurdish language.

In the field of Persian language and literature, Lecoq recently published a French translation of the Shahnameh, a sequel to the 19th century translation by Julius von Mohl.

A festschrift, with contributions by his colleagues and student, was published in honor of Pièrre Lecoq in 2016.

Lecoq was awarded with the 12th Farabi International Award;

== Works ==
=== Books ===
- — (2020). L'épigraphie achéménide vieux-perse. Grammaire, textes, glossaire. Paris: Geuthner.
- — (2020). L'épigraphie arsacide et Sassanide : parthe et moyen-perse. Grammaire, textes, glossaire. Paris: Geuthner.
- — (2020). Les langues iraniennes. Manuel de linguistique et de philologie iranienne. Paris: Geuthner.
- — (2020). L'épigraphie achéménide vieux-perse. Grammaire, textes, glossaire. Paris: Geuthner.
- Ferdowsi (2019). Shâhnâmeh: Le livre des rois, traduit du persan en vers libres et rimées. Translated by Lecoq, Pierre. Paris: Les Belles Lettres. ISBN 9782251450292. (prix R. et T. Ghirshman de l'AIBL, 2020 ; prix Iraj Afshâr 2020)
- — (2016). Les livres de l'Avesta. Textes sacrés des zoroastriens. Paris: Le Cerf. (Prix E. Benvensite de l’AIBL, 2018).
- — (2002). Recherches sur les dialectes kermaniens. Acta Iranica. Vol. 39. Louvain: Peeters. ISBN 9789042911734.
- — (1997). Les inscriptions achéménides. Paris: Gallimard. (traduit en persan Katibehāye Haxāmaneši, Tehrān, 1381, [2003]).
- — (1979). Le dialecte de Sivand. Beiträge zur Iranistik. Vol. 10. Wiesbaden: Reichert. ISBN 9783882260649.

=== Selected articles ===
- — (1974). "La langue des inscriptions achéménides". Acta Iranica. 2: 55–62.
- — (1974). "Le problème de l'écriture cunéiforme vieux-perse". Acta Iranica. 3: 25–107.
- — (1974). "Le dialecte d'Abyāne". Studia Iranica. 3: 51–63.
- — (1975). "Le dialecte d'Abu Zeyd Ābād". Acta Iranica. 5: 15–38.
- — (1984). "Un problème de religion achéménide: Ahura Mazda ou Xvarnah ?". Acta Iranica. 23: 301–326.
- — (1987). "Le mot farnah et les Scythes". Comptes rendus des séances de l'Académie des Inscriptions et Belles-Lettres. 131 (4): 671–682. doi:10.3406/crai.1987.14544.
- — (1989). "Les dialectes caspiens et les dialectes du nord-ouest de l'Iran". Compendium Linguarum Iranicarum. Wiesbaden: Reichert. pp. 296–312.
- — (1989). "Les dialectes du centre de l'Iran". Compendium Linguarum Iranicarum. Wiesbaden: Reichert. pp. 313–326.
- — (1989). "Les dialectes du sud-ouest de l'Iran". Compendium Linguarum Iranicarum. Wiesbaden: Reichert. pp. 341–349.
- — (1989). "Le classement des langues irano-aryennes occidentales". Études irano-aryennes offertes à Gilbert Lazard. Cahiers du Studia Iranica. Vol. 7. Paris. pp. 247–264.
- — (1990). "Paradis en vieux perse ?". Contribution à l'Histoire de l'Iran. Mélanges J. Parrot. Paris. pp. 209–213.
- — (1990). "Observations sur le sens du mot dahyu dans les inscriptions achéménides". Transeuphratène. 3: 131–139.
- — (1995). "Un aspect de la politique religieuse de Gaumata le Mage". Au carrefour des religions. Bures-sur-Yvette: Groupe pour l'Étude de la Civilisation du Moyen-Orient. pp. 183–186.
- — (1996–1997). "La grammaire historique du kurde". The Journal of Kurdish Studies. II: 31–36.
- — (2013). "The Place of Kurdish among the Iranian Languages". Acta Iranica. 54: 89–103.
- — (2017). "Le –a final en vieux perse". Studia Philologica Iranica: Gherardo Gnoli Memorial Volume. Rome. pp. 217–222.
