= Hyrcanis (Lydia) =

Ancient city in Asia Minor

Coordinates: 38°40′03″N 27°40′02″E

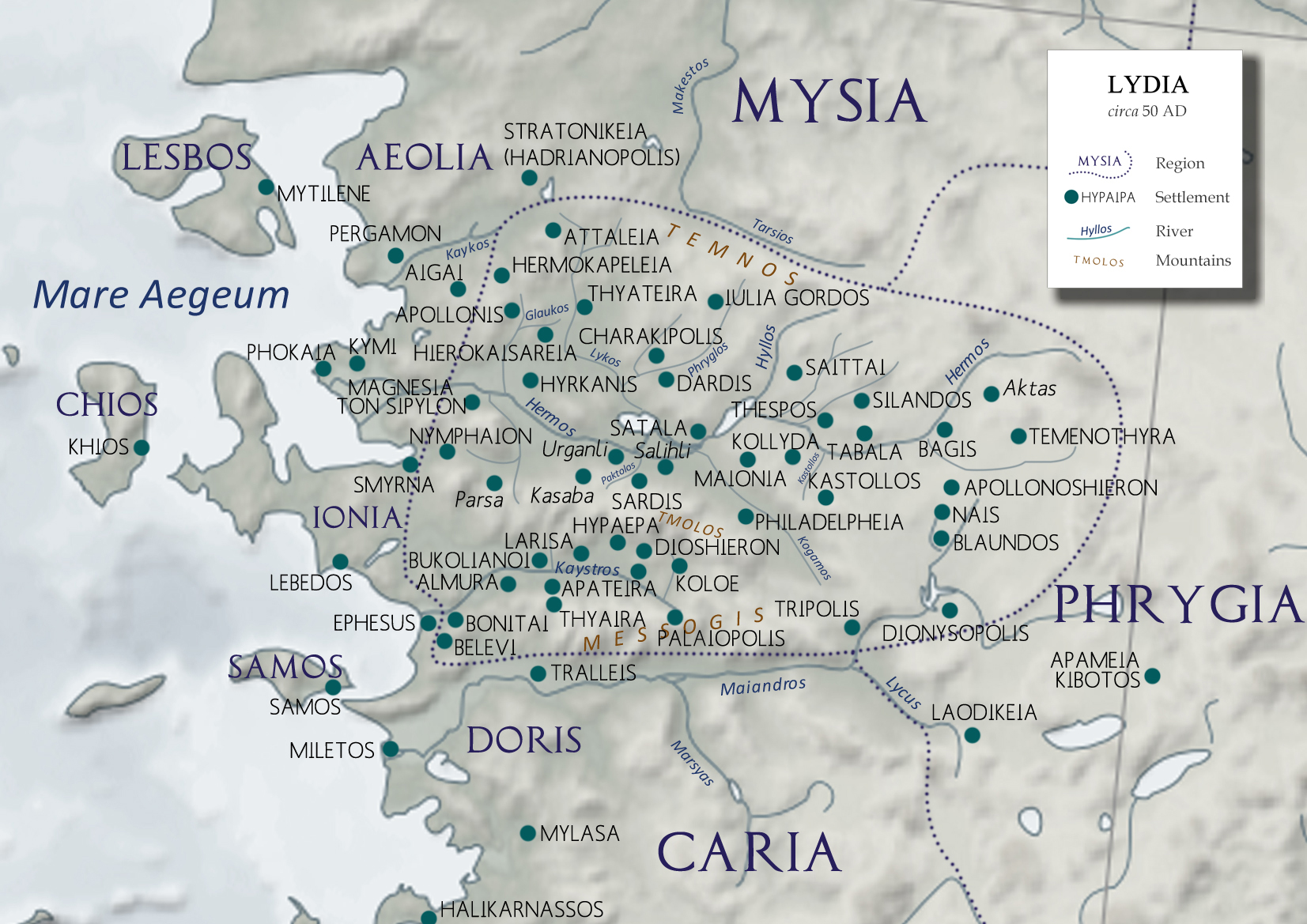
Hyrcanis among the cities of Lydia (ca. 50 AD)

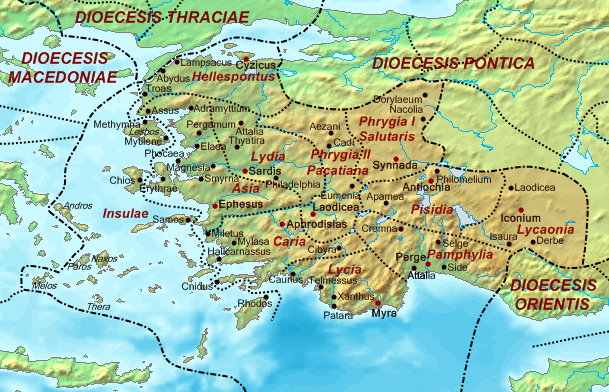
Asia Minor 400AD

Hyrcanis or Hyrkaneis, also known as Hyrcania (Ancient Greek: Ὑρκανία), was a Roman and Byzantine-era city and bishopric in ancient Lydia, now in western Turkey. It was situated in the Hyrcanian plain (τὸ Ὑρκάνιον πεδίον), which is said to have derived its name from a colony of Hyrcanians being settled here by the Persians. They were afterwards mingled with some Macedonians, who also settled in this district, whence they are called by Pliny the Elder and Tacitus "Macedones Hyrcani." The city minted its own coins.

Its site is located west of Halit Paşa in Asiatic Turkey, south of Çamlıyurt.

The city was also the seat of an ancient bishopric. Known bishops include:

- Asyncritus
- John, attendee at First Council of Constantinople
- Eustathius
- Dionysius fl.1157
