= Phrataphernes =

Persian satrap under Alexander the Great.

Phrataphernes (Median: Fratafarnah, Ancient Greek: Φραταφέρνης; lived 4th century BC) was a Persian who held the government of Parthia and Hyrcania, under the king Darius III Codomannus, and joined that monarch with the contingents from the provinces subject to his rule, shortly before the battle of Gaugamela in 331 BC. He afterwards accompanied the king on his flight into Hyrcania.

== Service with Alexander the Great ==
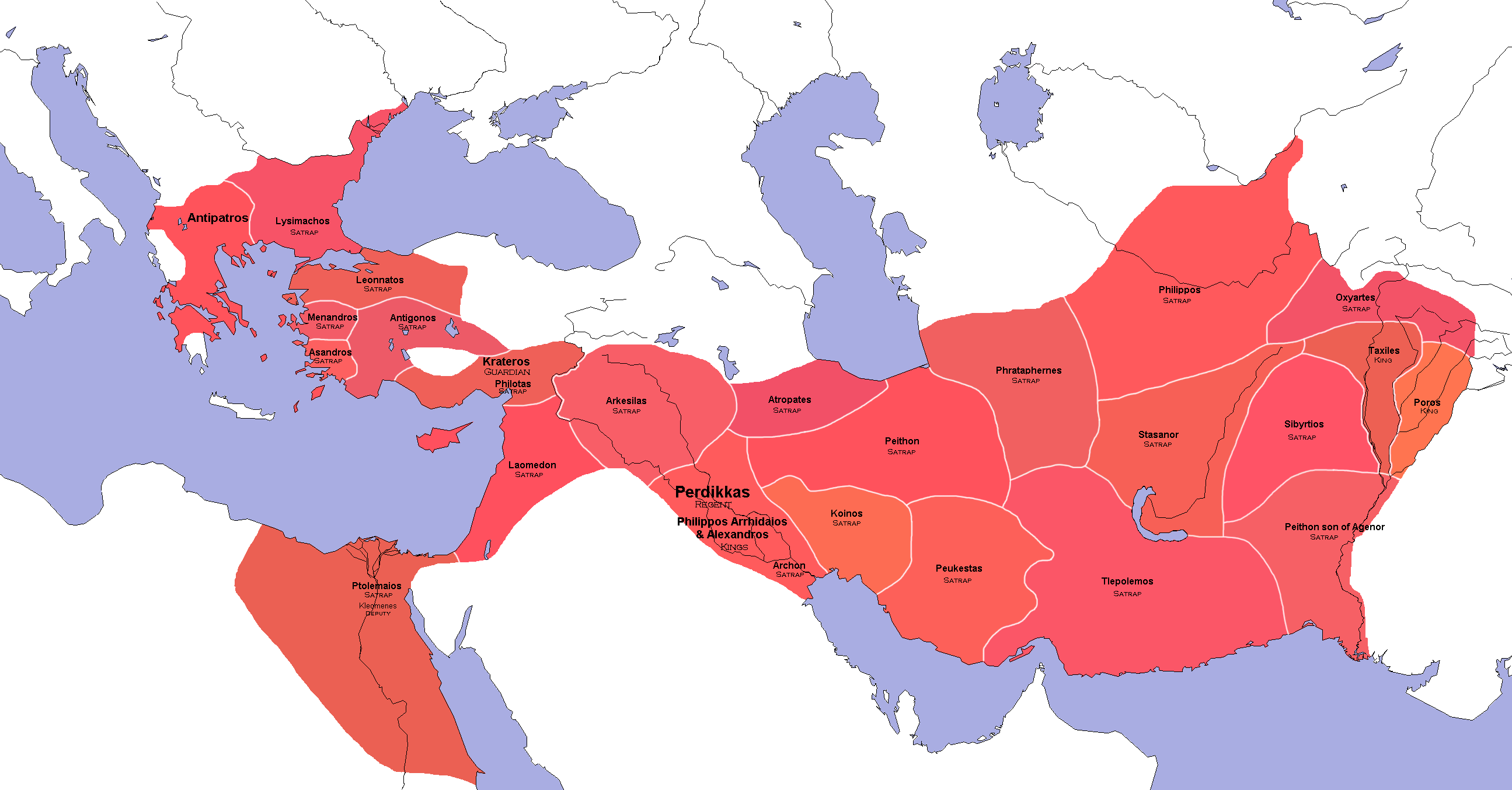
Phrataphernes retained the Hellenistic satrapy of Parthia, in the Partition of Babylon (323 BC) following Alexander's death.

After the death of Darius, Phrataphernes surrendered voluntarily to Alexander the Great, by whom he was kindly received, and appears to have been shortly after reinstated in his satrapy. At least he is termed by Arrian satrap of Parthia, during the advance of Alexander against Bessus, when he was detached by the king, together with Erigyius and Caranus to crush the revolt of Satibarzanes, in Aria (329 BC). He rejoined the king at Zariaspa in 328 BC. The next winter (328–327 BC), during the stay of Alexander at Nautaca, Phrataphernes was again despatched to reduce the disobedient satrap of the Mardi and Tapuri, Autophradates, a service which he successfully performed, and brought the rebel as a captive to the king, by whom he was subsequently put to death. He rejoined Alexander in India, shortly after the defeat of Porus, but he seems to have again returned to his satrapy, from whence we find him sending his son Pharasmanes with a large train of camels and beasts of burden, laden with provisions for the supply of the army during the toilsome march through Gedrosia.

From this time we hear no more of him until after the death of Alexander (323 BC). In the first division of the provinces consequent on that event, the Partition of Babylon (323 BC), he retained his government, but it is probable that he died prior to the second partition at Triparadisus (321 BC), as on that occasion we find the satrapy of Parthia bestowed on Philip, who had been previously governor of Sogdiana.
