= Agabus =

One of the seventy early Christian disciples

Saint Agabus
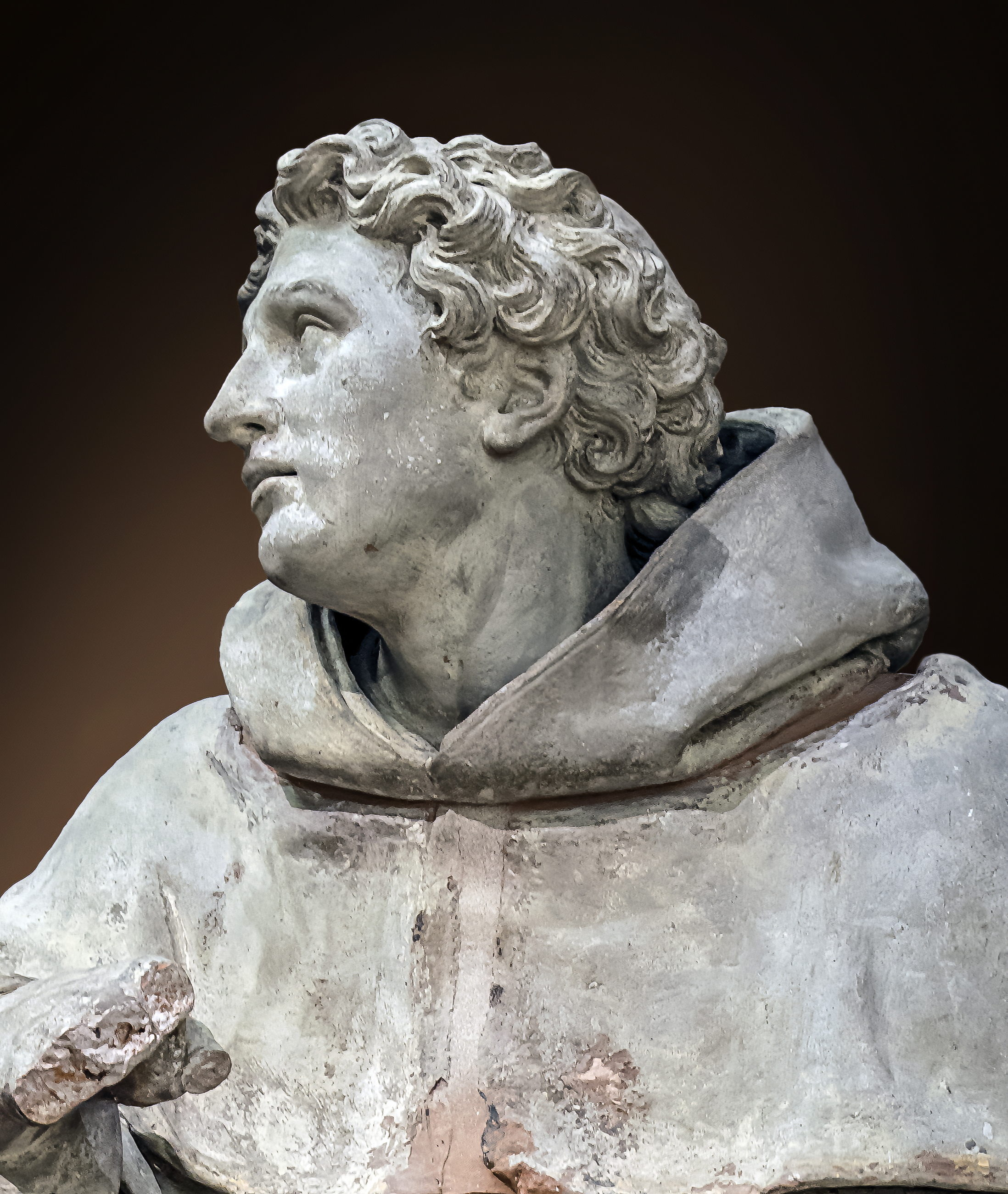
- Agabus c. 1690 by Marc Arcis

Prophet, Disciple, & Martyr
- Born: 1st century AD; Antioch, Province of Syria, Roman Empire
- Died: unknown Antioch
- Venerated in: Catholic Church; Eastern Orthodox Church; Church of England
- Feast: February 13 (Catholic); March 8 (Eastern Orthodox)
- Patronage: prophets

Agabus (/ˈæɡəbəs/; Greek: Ἄγαβος, romanized: Hágabos; Syriac: ܚܓܒ, romanized: Ḥagabo) was an early follower of Christianity from Syria mentioned in the Acts of the Apostles as a prophet. He is traditionally remembered as one of the Seventy Disciples described in Luke 10 (10:1–24).

== Name ==
The name Agabus derived from the Aramaic Ḥagab, meaning "Grasshopper", which may have been a nickname or pseudonym.

== Biblical and traditional accounts ==
According to extrabiblical tradition, Agabus appears to have been a resident of Jerusalem. He is said to have been one of the seventy two disciples, mentioned in the Gospel of Luke, commissioned to preach the gospel. It is said that Agabus was with the twelve apostles in the upper room on the day of Pentecost.

According to Acts 11:27–28, he was one of a group of prophets who travelled from Jerusalem to Antioch. The author reports that Agabus had received the gift of prophecy and predicted a severe famine, which occurred during the reign of the emperor Claudius.

Also, according to Acts 21:10–12, 'a certain prophet', (Greek: τις) named Agabus met Paul the Apostle at Caesarea Maritima in AD 58. He was, according to the Jamieson-Fausset-Brown Bible Commentary, 'no doubt the same' Agabus as had been mentioned in Acts 11:27–28, and Heinrich Meyer states that 'there is no reason against the assumed identity of this person with the one mentioned in Acts 11:28. Agabus warned Paul of his coming capture; he bound his own hands and feet with Paul's belt to demonstrate what would happen if he continued his journey to Jerusalem, stating the message of the Holy Spirit:

So shall the Jews at Jerusalem bind the man who owns this belt, and deliver him into the hands of the Gentiles.

Paul, however, would not be persuaded to stay away.

Agabus' symbolic action has been compared with the Jewish prophet Jeremiah:

Thus the LORD said to me, "Go and buy yourself a linen waistband and put it around your waist, but do not put it in water." So I bought the waistband in accordance with the word of the LORD and put it around my waist ... For as a belt is bound around the waist, so I bound all the people of Israel and all the people of Judah to me,' declares the LORD, 'to be my people for my renown and praise and honor.

Tradition says that Agabas went to many countries, teaching and converting many. This moved the Jews of Jerusalem to arrest him, and they tortured him by beating him severely, and putting a rope around his neck. He was dragged outside the city and stoned to death. Jesuit theologian Anthony Maas says he was martyred at Antioch.

== Veneration ==
The Catholic Church's General Roman Calendar lists his feast day on February 13, while Eastern Christians celebrate it on March 8.

== See also ==
- Paul the Apostle
- Barnabas
- Saint Stephen
