= Sorkh Lijeh =

Sorkh Lijeh or Sarkhalijeh or Sorkh Alijeh or Sorkhelijeh (Persian: سرخليجه) may refer to:

- Sorkh Lijeh, Hamadan
- Sorkh Alijeh, Kermanshah
