= Chenaran, Hamadan =

Village in Hamadan province, Iran

Chenaran Persian: چناران
- Village
- Location within Iran
- Coordinates: 34°08′58″N 48°15′34″E
- Country: Iran
- Province: Hamadan
- County: Nahavand
- District: Giyan
- Rural District: Giyan

Population (2016)
  - Total: 137
- Time zone: UTC+3:30 (IRST)

Chenaran (Persian: چناران) (Note: Also romanized as Chenārān; also known as Chenār) is a village in Giyan Rural District of Giyan District in Nahavand County, Hamadan province, Iran.

== Demographics ==
=== Population ===
At the time of the 2006 National Census, the village's population was 163 in 43 households. The following census in 2011 counted 187 people in 43 households. The 2016 census measured the population of the village as 137 people in 33 households.
