= Apamea (Media) =

Hellenistic city in Media

Apamea or Apameia (Greek: Απάμεια) was a Hellenistic city in Media founded by Seleucus I Nicator, near Laodicea (now Nahavand, Iran) and Heraclea. (Strabo xi. p. 524; Stephanus of Byzantium "Laodikeia"). Apamea's precise location is not known, but it was located near Nahavand.Apamea is old Phrygien Kelainai in Afyonkarahisar Province Turkey.(Near Leodekia-Denizli Province)

== See also ==
- List of ancient Greek cities
