= Hajjiabad-e Kark =

Village in Hamadan province, Iran

Hajjiabad-e Kark Persian: حاجي ابادكرك
- Village
- Location within Iran
- Coordinates: 34°08′56″N 48°16′37″E
- Country: Iran
- Province: Hamadan
- County: Nahavand
- District: Giyan
- Rural District: Giyan

Population (2016)
  - Total: 172
- Time zone: UTC+3:30 (IRST)

Hajjiabad-e Kark (Persian: حاجي ابادكرك) (Note: Also romanized as Ḩājjīābād-e Kark; also known as Haji Abad Olya, Ḩājīābād, and Ḩājjīābād) is a village in Giyan Rural District of Giyan District in Nahavand County, Hamadan province, Iran.

== Demographics ==
=== Population ===
At the time of the 2006 National Census, the village's population was 231 in 57 households. The following census in 2011 counted 214 people in 61 households. The 2016 census measured the population of the village as 172 people in 47 households.
