= Nisaean plain =

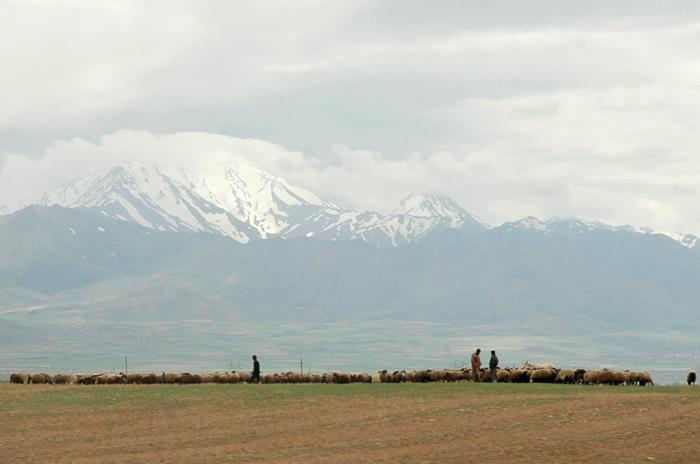
The Nisaean plain, surrounding Ecbatana (modern Hamadan)

The Nisaean plain (also spelled Nesaean; Greek: Nḗsaion pedíon) (Note: Old Iranian *i was ostensibly rendered as ē in the most renowned Greek Herodotean manuscripts.) was a fertile plain in Media, a historic region in Iran. It was best known for being the home of the esteemed Nisaean horse. The plain may be identical with the Nisaya district mentioned in the Behistun Inscription of Darius the Great (r. 522–486 BC). However, Rüdiger Schmitt notes that this cannot be strictly proven. The name of the plain possibly survived into the Medieval era, as Yaqut al-Hamawi, writing in the 13th century, mentioned a town in Hamadan (ancient Ecbatana) with the name Nisa. The city of Nahavand is located on the Nisaean plain.

Alireza Shapur Shahbazi in Iranica identifies the plain (Nīšāya, Nisāya, Nesā) with the site of Harunabad (Shahabad, modern-day Eslamabad-e Gharb in Kermanshah Province), on the road between Hulwan and Hamadan.

== Sources ==
- Schmitt, Rüdiger (2002). "Nisāya". Encyclopaedia Iranica.
- Sherwin-White, Susan Mary; Wiesehöfer, Josef (2012). "Laodicea-Nihavend". In Hornblower, Simon; Spawforth, Antony; Eidinow, Esther (eds.). The Oxford Classical Dictionary (4 ed.). Oxford University Press.
