= Varazaneh =

Village in Hamadan province, Iran

Varazaneh Persian: ورازانه
- Village
- Location within Iran
- Coordinates: 34°11′08″N 48°11′10″E
- Country: Iran
- Province: Hamadan
- County: Nahavand
- District: Giyan
- Rural District: Sarab

Population (2016)
  - Total: 1,051
- Time zone: UTC+3:30 (IRST)

Varazaneh (Persian: ورازانه) (Note: Also romanized as Varāzāneh and Vorāzāneh; also known as Varāzeneh) is a village in Sarab Rural District of Giyan District in Nahavand County, Hamadan province, Iran. The rainiest month in Varazaneh is April, when it averages 73.9mm of precipitation.

== Demographics ==
=== Population ===
At the time of the 2006 National Census, the village's population was 1,019 in 247 households. The following census in 2011 counted 1,077 people in 310 households. The 2016 census measured the population of the village as 1,051 people in 318 households.
