= Gilabad =

Gilabad (Persian: گيل اباد) may refer to:

- Gilabad, Hamadan
- Gilabad, Mazandaran
