= Kark-e Olya =

Village in Hamadan province, Iran

Kark-e Olya Persian: كرك عليا
- Village
- Location within Iran
- Coordinates: 34°09′29″N 48°18′04″E
- Country: Iran
- Province: Hamadan
- County: Nahavand
- District: Giyan
- Rural District: Giyan

Population (2016)
  - Total: 799
- Time zone: UTC+3:30 (IRST)

Kark-e Olya (Persian: كرك عليا) (Note: Also romanized as Karak Olya and Kark-e ‘Olyā; also known as Karak-e Bālā and Kark-e Bālā) is a village in Giyan Rural District of Giyan District in Nahavand County, Hamadan province, Iran.

== Demographics ==
=== Population ===
At the time of the 2006 National Census, the village's population was 795 in 203 households. The following census in 2011 counted 819 people in 231 households. The 2016 census measured the population of the village as 799 people in 233 households.
