= Nisean horse =

Breed of horse

The Nisean horse, or Nisaean horse, is an extinct horse breed once native to the plains near modern-day Hamadan, Iran.

Described as the "superhorse of antiquity", it was the most prized breed in the history of ancient Persia due to its beauty, large size, and speed.

== Sources ==
The Nisean horses are known mainly from textual and iconographical sources. The breed was mentioned in texts as far as China. The first written reference to the Nisean horse was in around 430 BCE, in Herodotus' Histories:

"In front of the king went first a thousand horsemen, picked men of the Persian nation then spearmen a thousand, likewise chosen troops, with their spearheads pointing towards the ground – next ten of the sacred horses called Nisaean, all daintily caparisoned. (Now these horses are called Nisaean, because they come from the Nisaean plain, a vast flat in Media, producing horses of unusual size.)"

The Nisean horse was first mentioned in great detail by A.T. Olmstead, in his History of the Persian Empire.

== Origin ==
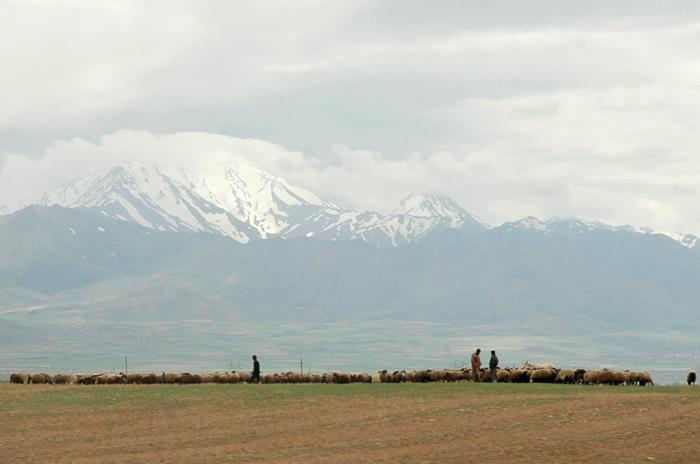
The Nisaean plain, surrounding Ecbatana (modern Hamadan)

The Median plains produced the finest horses in the Achaemenid Empire, and those of the royal stud were picked from them. Median plains at Nush-i Jan near Hamadan have produced remains of horses of varied sizes "from ponies or miniature horses that stood 1.05-1.10 m to horses standing over 1.50 m at the withers, with the majority standing 1.35-1.37m, and variation from light to heavy types". The Nisean horses were the most prized among them, celebrated for their beauty, large size, and speed. Alfalfa, an ideal fodder for horses, grew prolifically in these plains.

The Nisean horses came from the Nisaean plains (Nīšāya, Nisāya, Nesā), which is located at the site of Harunabad (Shahabad, modern-day Eslamabad-e Gharb in Kermanshah Province), on the road between Hulwan and Hamadan in Media. The town of Nisaia, is located at the foot of the southern region of the Zagros Mountains, Iran.

The Nisean plains had around 160,000 horses in the Achaemenid period, but the number was reduced to 60,000 in the reign of Alexander.

During the reign of Darius, Nisean horses were bred from Armenian Highlands to Sogdiana. The Nisean horse was so sought after that the Greeks (mainly, the Spartans) imported Nisean horses and bred them to their native stock, and many nomadic tribes (such as the Scythians) in and around the Persian Empire also imported, captured, or stole Nisean horses.

== Description ==
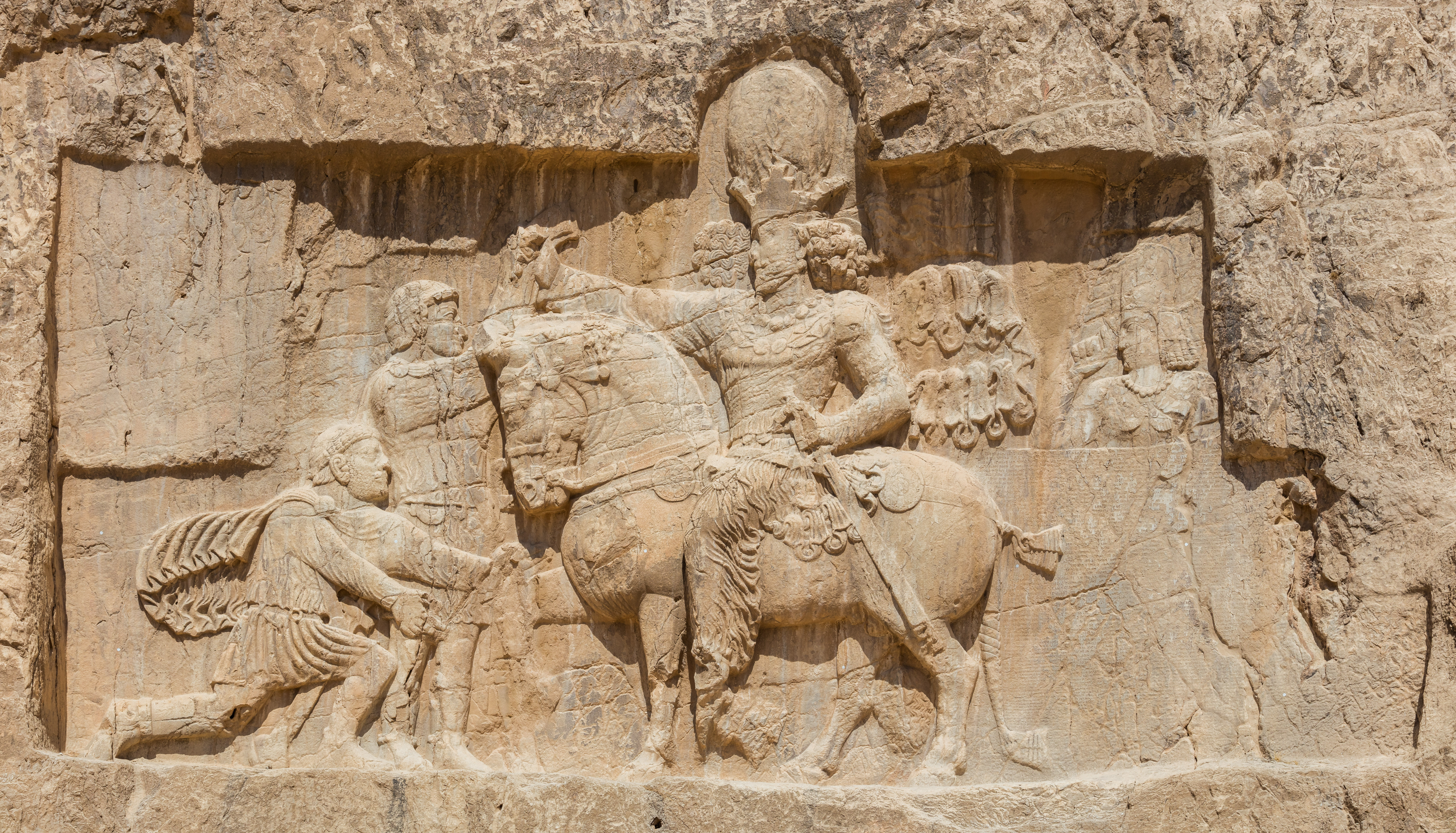
Shapur I's victory relief at Naqsh-e Rostam is believed to depict a Nisean horse.

The Nisean horses were highly regarded for their bravery, tenacity, speed, large size, stamina, and beauty. Elwyn Hartley Edwards in The New Encyclopedia of the Horse described the breed as the "superhorse of antiquity".

According to Strabo, "Their shape is peculiar, as is that of the Parthian horses, compared with those of Greece and others in our country".

The Nisean horse was said to have come in several colors, including common colors such as dark bay, chestnut and seal brown, but also rarer colors such as black, roan, palomino, and various spotted patterns. The ancient Nisean horse was said to have had "not the slender Arabian head of the Luristan Culture but a more robust one that was characteristic of the great warhorse". This suggests the Nisean may have been a descendant of the "forest horse" prototype. The Nisean, according to one source, was "tall and swift, and color adorned his sides. The Chinese called the breed the tian ma – heavenly horse or Soulon-vegetarian dragon. Some were spotted, like a leopard or, as golden as a newly minted coin. Others were red and blue roan with darker color.

== Use ==
The Nisean horses were used to carry the royal Achaemenid chariot, took part in Mithraic religious rituals, and in official ceremonies.

The Nisean and Ferghana horses had symbolic sacred role for royal legitimacy. Images of Nisean horses with a horn-like growth on their foreheads appeared on royal seals and coins from the Seleucid era.

Some later scholarship has connected the Nisean tradition of horn-like forehead growths with broader Eurasian descriptions of elite horses. A 2026 study by Olzhas Ospanov compared the Nisean and Ferghana "heavenly horse" traditions, arguing that both were associated with large size, speed, stamina, elite warfare, and high social rank. The study discusses Nisean horses with horn-like forehead growths in Seleucid-era royal imagery alongside Chinese textual descriptions of elite horses with a frontal protuberance. The authors suggest that these traditions may be understood within a wider Eurasian tradition of elite, sacred, and royal horses.

Olmstead also wrote that the Assyrians started their spring campaigns, by attacking the Medes for their horses. The Medes were the breeders of the first Nisean horses.

Describing the horses of the Parthian cavalry, Strabo notes that they were distinct from those of the Greek world, but similar to the Nisean horses of the Achaemenid kings. The Romans had their first encounter with the Nisean and the Parthian cataphract at the Battle of Carrhae (53 BC) when General Crassus went up against the great Parthian General Surena. After Crassus fell to the Parthians, his head and standards were presented to Orodes II. In 36 BC, Mark Antony avenged Crassus's death by launching a campaign against Media Atropatene with 16 legions. At his disposal were 100,000 infantry and 10,000 cavalry, drawn from as far away as Gaul and Spain. Of these, 30,000 were Roman Legionnaires. When the Parthians would not give him the battle he wanted, he ravaged Armenia, and brought back the Armenian King Artavasdes to Egypt. Among the prized possessions taken were the first Nisean horses in Rome. When Antony died, these horses fell into the hands of Augustus. According to Michael Decker in the Oxford Dictionary of Late Antiquity, Nisaean horses were the most famous Iranian breed.

A ritually buried stallion from Parthian period was discovered in Armenia, which suggests similarities to a Nisean horse.

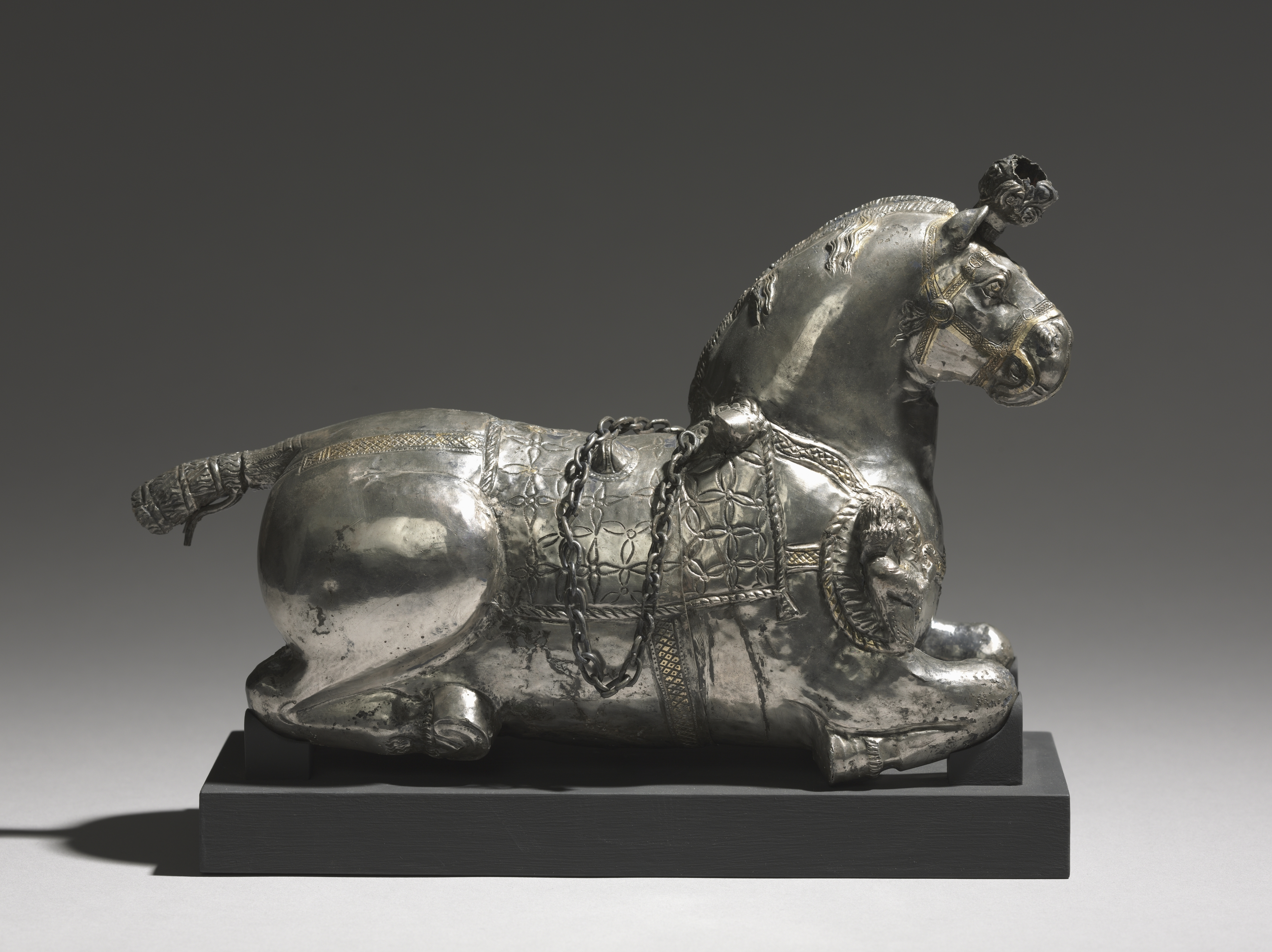
Sasanian metalwork depicting a Nisean horse.

The Nisean horses continued to be the most famous breed in the Sasanian period, which was favored most along with a small traditional breed.

The Nisean horse was likely the ancestor of the Turkoman horse. Modern horse breeds such as the Thoroughbred are considered to have some Nisean roots. Many hippologues consider Rakhsh, the stallion of the legendary Iranian hero Rostam, to be a Nisean horse.

== Historical events ==
- Following their assassination of Bardiya in 522 BCE, the conspirators led by Otanes and Darius the Great agreed that whoever's horse neighed at the moment of sunrise would be rewarded with the kingship of Persia. According to legend, Darius' Nisean horse neighed first.
- In 481 BCE, Xerxes invaded Thessaly and raced his Nisean mares against the legendary Thessalian mares and beat them.
- In 479 BCE, General Mardonius was killed beneath his gray Nisean stallion at the Battle of Plataea. The stallion was so feared for its training that the Athenians had actually devised a plan to kill the horse.
- When Alexander the Great conquered Persia, he demanded a tribute of thousands of Nisean horses from the captured cities.
- When the Roman writer Strabo saw the Nisean horses, he said that they were the most elegant riding horses alive.
- Describing the parade of Antiochus IV Epiphanes in Daphne, Syria, Polybius lists Nissioi (Νισαῖοι) as one of the units there, which refers to the Nisean horses.
- The elite Sasanian cavalry unit Zhayedan are thought to have used the Nisean horses.
- St. Isidore of Seville stated that the Roman horses of the imperial stud, founded by Justinian I in Constantinople, were the most beautiful horses in the world.
- Emperor Wu Ti was told about the Heavenly Horses to the West and sent an army to get some for China; thirteen Heavenly Horses were taken from Ferghana along with a thousand lesser animals. When the Emperor saw the horses, he decided that the expedition was worth it.
- The Nisean became extinct with the conquest of Constantinople in 1204.
