= Mianabad, Hamadan =

Village in Hamadan province, Iran

Mianabad Persian: ميان اباد
- Village
- Location within Iran
- Coordinates: 34°11′24″N 48°12′58″E
- Country: Iran
- Province: Hamadan
- County: Nahavand
- District: Giyan
- Rural District: Sarab

Population (2016)
  - Total: 1,830
- Time zone: UTC+3:30 (IRST)

Mianabad (Persian: ميان اباد) (Note: Also romanized as Mīānābād; also known as Mahīnābād, Mīān Ābeh, Mīānābeh, Mīnāvād, Minawad, and Muhinābād) is a village in, and the capital of, Sarab Rural District in Giyan District of Nahavand County, Hamadan province, Iran.

== Demographics ==
=== Population ===
At the time of the 2006 National Census, the village's population was 2,139 in 497 households. The following census in 2011 counted 2,150 people in 620 households. The 2016 census measured the population of the village as 1,830 people in 576 households, the most populous in its rural district.
