= Sarab Rural District =

Sarab Rural District (Persian: دهستان سراب) may refer to:

- Sarab Rural District (Nahavand County), Hamadan province
- Sarab Rural District (Eyvan County), Ilam province
- Sarab Rural District (Sonqor County), Kermanshah province

== See also ==
- Sarab Bagh Rural District
