= Zafarabad, Hamadan =

Village in Hamadan province, Iran

Zafarabad Persian: ظفراباد
- Village
- Location within Iran
- Coordinates: 34°10′43″N 48°12′42″E
- Country: Iran
- Province: Hamadan
- County: Nahavand
- District: Giyan
- Rural District: Sarab

Population (2016)
  - Total: 694
- Time zone: UTC+3:30 (IRST)

Zafarabad (Persian: ظفراباد) (Note: Also romanized as Z̧afarābād) is a village in Sarab Rural District of Giyan District in Nahavand County, Hamadan province, Iran.

== Demographics ==
=== Population ===
At the time of the 2006 National Census, the village's population was 643 in 149 households. The following census in 2011 counted 680 people in 175 households. The 2016 census measured the population of the village as 694 people in 209 households.
