= Mahanabad =

Village in Hamadan province, Iran

Mahanabad Persian: مهان اباد
- Village
- Location within Iran
- Coordinates: 34°10′47″N 48°12′36″E
- Country: Iran
- Province: Hamadan
- County: Nahavand
- District: Giyan
- Rural District: Sarab

Population (2016)
  - Total: 416
- Time zone: UTC+3:30 (IRST)

Mahanabad (Persian: مهان اباد) (Note: Also romanized as Mahānābād; also known as Mahān, Moḩammadabābād, and Moḩammadābād) is a village in Sarab Rural District of Giyan District in Nahavand County, Hamadan province, Iran.

== Demographics ==
=== Population ===
At the time of the 2006 National Census, the village's population was 418 in 104 households. The following census in 2011 counted 467 people in 129 households. The 2016 census measured the population of the village as 416 people in 125 households.
