= Kark-e Sofla =

Village in Hamadan province, Iran

Kark-e Sofla Persian: كرك سفلي
- Village
- Location within Iran
- Coordinates: 34°10′10″N 48°17′26″E
- Country: Iran
- Province: Hamadan
- County: Nahavand
- District: Giyan
- Rural District: Giyan

Population (2016)
  - Total: 549
- Time zone: UTC+3:30 (IRST)

Kark-e Sofla (Persian: كرك سفلي) (Note: Also romanized as Kark-e Soflá; also known as Kark) is a village in Giyan Rural District of Giyan District in Nahavand County, Hamadan province, Iran.

== Demographics ==
=== Population ===
At the time of the 2006 National Census, the village's population was 589 in 136 households. The following census in 2011 counted 571 people in 155 households. The 2016 census measured the population of the village as 549 people in 156 households.
