= Asadabad, Nahavand =

Village in Hamadan province, Iran

Asadabad Persian: اسداباد
- Village
- Location within Iran
- Coordinates: 34°11′15″N 48°10′20″E
- Country: Iran
- Province: Hamadan
- County: Nahavand
- District: Giyan
- Rural District: Sarab

Population (2016)
  - Total: 437
- Time zone: UTC+3:30 (IRST)

Asadabad (Persian: اسداباد) (Note: Also romanized as Asadābād) is a village in Sarab Rural District of Giyan District in Nahavand County, Hamadan province, Iran.

== Demographics ==
=== Population ===
At the time of the 2006 National Census, the village's population was 389 in 80 households. The following census in 2011 counted 415 people in 111 households. The 2016 census measured the population of the village as 437 people in 119 households.
