= Hoseynabad-e Giyan =

Village in Hamadan province, Iran

Hoseynabad-e Giyan Persian: حسين اباد گيان
- Village
- Location within Iran
- Coordinates: 34°09′40″N 48°15′57″E
- Country: Iran
- Province: Hamadan
- County: Nahavand
- District: Giyan
- Rural District: Giyan

Population (2016)
  - Total: 1,017
- Time zone: UTC+3:30 (IRST)

Hoseynabad-e Giyan (Persian: حسين ابادگيان) (Note: Also romanized as Hoseynabad Gian and Ḩoseynābād Gīān; also known as Hosein Abad and Ḩoseynābād) is a village in Giyan Rural District of Giyan District in Nahavand County, Hamadan province, Iran.

== Demographics ==
=== Population ===
At the time of the 2006 National Census, the village's population was 728 in 227 households. The following census in 2011 counted 1,023 people in 297 households. The 2016 census measured the population of the village as 1,017 people in 305 households, the most populous in its rural district.
