= Sorkh Lijeh, Hamadan =

Village in Hamadan province, Iran

Sorkh Lijeh Persian: سرخليجه
- Village
- Location within Iran
- Coordinates: 34°08′26″N 48°17′23″E
- Country: Iran
- Province: Hamadan
- County: Nahavand
- District: Giyan
- Rural District: Giyan

Population (2016)
  - Total: 189
- Time zone: UTC+3:30 (IRST)

Sorkh Lijeh (Persian: سرخليجه) (Note: Also romanized as Sarkhalījeh and Sorkh Lījeh; also known as Sork’ehlīj, Sorkheh Līj, Sorkheh Lījeh, and Sorkheh Lizeh) is a village in Giyan Rural District of Giyan District in Nahavand County, Hamadan province, Iran.

== Demographics ==
=== Population ===
At the time of the 2006 National Census, the village's population was 199 in 48 households. The following census in 2011 counted 224 people in 64 households. The 2016 census measured the population of the village as 189 people in 56 households.
