= Giyan =

City in Hamadan province, Iran

Giyan Persian: گيان
- City
- Location within Iran
- Coordinates: 34°10′32″N 48°14′37″E
- Country: Iran
- Province: Hamadan
- County: Nahavand
- District: Giyan
- Established: 2005

Population (2016)
  - Total: 8,186
- Time zone: UTC+3:30 (IRST)

Giyan (Persian: گيان) (Note: Also romanized as Gīyān; also known as Kīān, Qayān, and Qīān) is a city in, and the capital of, Giyan District in Nahavand County, Hamadan province, Iran. It also serves as the administrative center for Giyan Rural District. The village of Giyan was converted to a city in 2005.

== Demographics ==
=== Population ===
At the time of the 2006 National Census, the city's population was 8,062 in 1,999 households. The following census in 2011 counted 8,102 people in 2,340 households. The 2016 census measured the population of the city as 8,186 people in 2,553 households.

== See also ==
Tepe Giyan
