= Giyan Rural District =

Rural district in Hamadan province, Iran

Giyan Rural District Persian: دهستان گیان
- Rural District
- Location within Iran
- Coordinates: 34°08′N 48°15′E
- Country: Iran
- Province: Hamadan
- County: Nahavand
- District: Giyan
- Established: 1990
- Capital: Giyan

Population (2016)
  - Total: 2,863
- Time zone: UTC+3:30 (IRST)

Giyan Rural District (Persian: دهستان گیان) is in Giyan District of Nahavand County, Hamadan province, Iran. It is administered from the city of Giyan.

== Demographics ==
=== Population ===
At the time of the 2006 National Census, the rural district's population was 2,705 in 714 households. There were 3,038 inhabitants in 851 households at the following census of 2011. The 2016 census measured the population of the rural district as 2,863 in 830 households. The most populous of its six villages was Hoseynabad-e Giyan, with 1,017 people.

=== Other villages in the rural district ===
- Chenaran
- Hajjiabad-e Kark
- Kark-e Olya
- Kark-e Sofla
- Sorkh Lijeh
