= Ahmad Nahavandi =

8/9th century Persian astronomer

Ahmad ibn Muhammad al-Nahawandi'
- احمد نهاوندى
- Born: fl. 8/9th century Nahavand

Academic work
- Era: Islamic Golden Age
- Main interests: Astronomy

Ahmad ibn Muhammad al-Nahawandi (Persian: احمد نهاوندى), also called al-Nahawandi, was an 8th/9th century Persian astronomer. His name indicates that he was from Nahavand, now in modern Iran.

== Life ==
Al-Nahawandi lived and worked at the Academy of Gundishapur, in Khuzestan, Iran, at the time of Yahya ibn Khalid ibn Barmak, the provincial governor and all-powerful long-time vizier to Caliph Harun al-Rashid. Al-Nahawandi is reported to have been making astronomical observations at the academy in around 800. He and the astronomer and mathematician Mashallah ibn Athari were among the earliest Islamic era astronomers who flourished during the reign of al-Mansur, the second Abbasid caliph.

== Works ==
Al-Nahawandi compiled zijes (astronomical tables) under the title Mushtamil.

== Sources ==
- Frye, Richard Nelson (2000). The Golden Age of Persia. London: Phoenix Press. ISBN 978-1-84212-011-8.
- Suter, Heinrich (1900). Die Mathematiker und Astronomen der Araber und ihre Werke (in German). Leipzig: Teubner. p. 10. OCLC 230703086.
