= Shapur I's victory relief at Naqsh-e Rostam =

Relief in Fars Province, Iran

Coordinates: 29.9886°N 52.8719°E

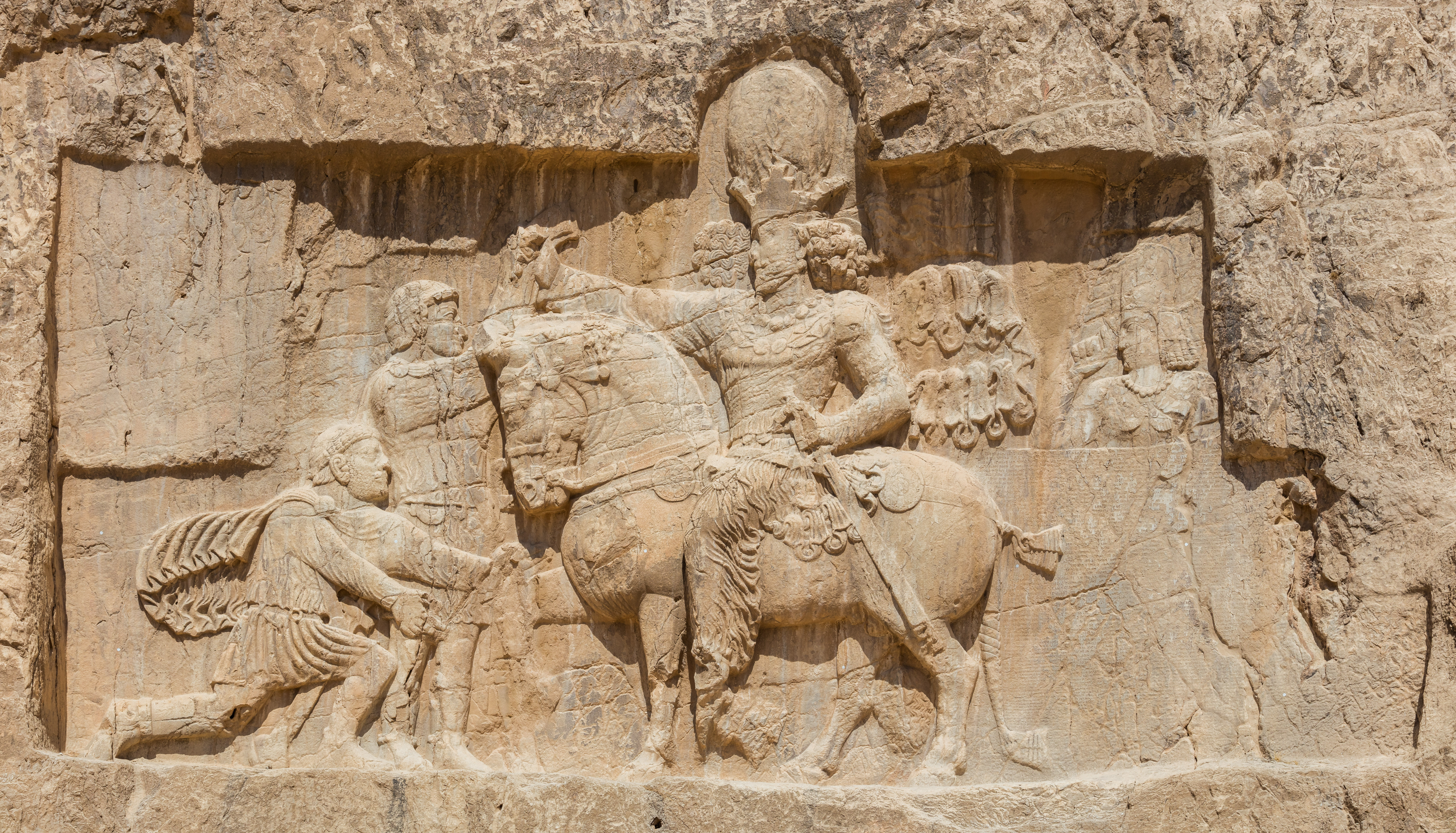

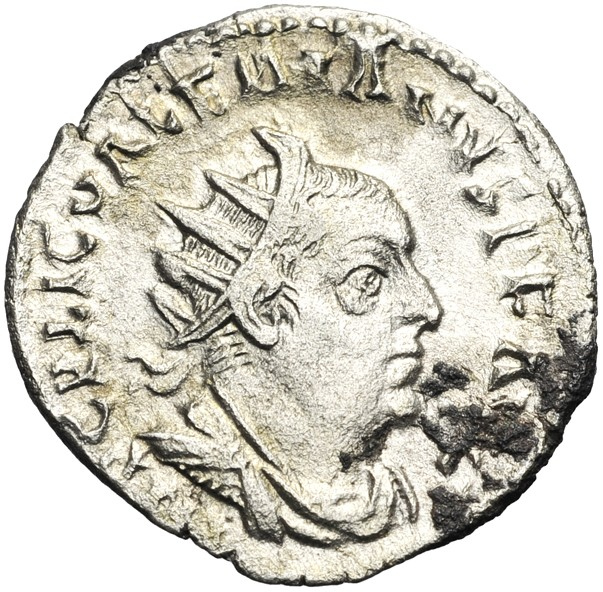
Valerian picture on his coin

Shapur I's victory relief at Naqsh-e Rostam is located 3 kilometers north of Persepolis. It is one of eight Sasanian rock carvings cut into the cliff beneath the tombs of their Achaemenid predecessors.

Victory relief of Shapur I over the Roman emperors is a Sasanian rock relief carved into the cliff face of Naqsh-e Rustam, approximately ten meters east of the Tomb of Darius the Great. The relief measures about 11 meters in length and 5 meters in height, and belongs to the Sasanian Empire period.

In the scene, Shapur I faces left. His hair is long and flowing, his beard is curly and ringed, and he wears a looped necklace and earrings. His attire consists of a tight, pleated tunic with a belt, trousers gathered at the ankles, and a cloak fastened with two rings at the chest and billowing behind him. The diadem on his crown has long pleated ribbons hanging down his back. Based on his coinage, the statue in the Shapur cave near Kazerun, and his depiction on a silver cup, it is known that Shapur wore a crenellated crown topped with a large royal globe, represented here in high relief.

Beneath the horse of the king, an inscription in Greek in five lines can be seen, commemorating Shapur's victory over Valerian. The Middle Persian and Parthian versions, which were probably engraved on the horse's belly, have been lost, and the Greek text is partly damaged. The content is identical to the king's inscription at Naqsh-e Rajab, which includes his name, titles, and genealogy.

Shapur's long, straight sword remains sheathed; his left hand rests on its hilt while his right hand extends forward to grasp the wrist of a standing Roman. The horse is richly adorned, its tail knotted and decorated with long pleated ribbons. The saddlecloth and breast strap feature large floral ornaments, and the mane is elaborately arranged. A large pommel hangs between the horse's legs, its folds finely rendered. The king sits upright with royal composure, and the horse, shown nearly life-size, raises its right foreleg in a poised stance.

The horse is believed to be a Nisean horse.

In front of the horse kneels a Roman man in an imperial toga, his left knee on the ground and his right knee bent, extending both hands toward the king in supplication, his left hand touching the horse's knee. He appears middle-aged, bearded, and crowned with a laurel wreath — the traditional imperial emblem. He wears a long-sleeved tunic reaching his knees and a sheathed sword with a cross-shaped hilt.

Beside him stands another clean-shaven man wearing a similar toga and laurel wreath, whose wrist is held by Shapur. Both figures are identified as Roman emperors. Until 1954, scholars generally believed that the kneeling figure represented Valerian, pleading for mercy, and that the standing man was a Syrian named Cyriades, whom Shapur allegedly placed on the Roman throne.

However, in 1954, David Wright MacDermot refuted this theory, supported by Roman Ghirshman and others. MacDermot noted that Cyriades is not mentioned in Shapur's own inscriptions at the Ka'ba-ye Zartosht and that no coins bearing his name exist. Shapur's inscriptions refer to three Roman emperors: Gordian III, who was killed; Philip the Arab, who sought peace and paid 500,000 gold coins in tribute; and Valerian, who was captured. The reliefs of Shapur, therefore, depict all three: the youthful emperor under the horse (Gordian), the kneeling one (Philip), and the captured standing one whose wrist Shapur holds (Valerian).

Supporting MacDermot's interpretation, Valerian's coins show him as beardless, matching the standing captive, while Philip's depict a short curly beard like the kneeling figure. Moreover, Valerian's thick neck on coins corresponds to that of the standing man beside the horse.

Behind Shapur, around 280 CE, the relief and inscription of Kartir, the chief priest (mobedān mobed), was carved on the same rock face.

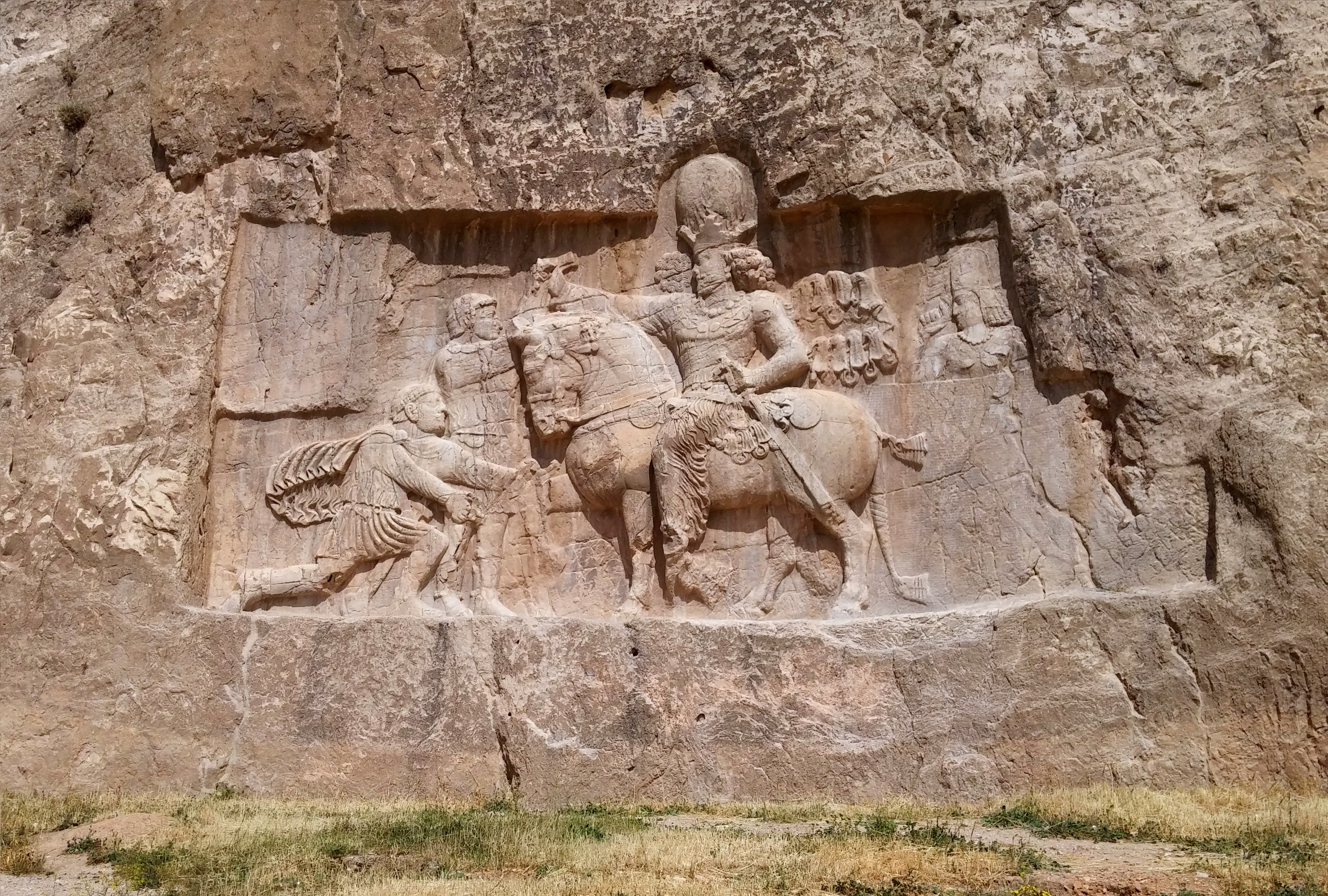
Shapur I's victory relief over the Roman emperors at Naqsh-e Rustam

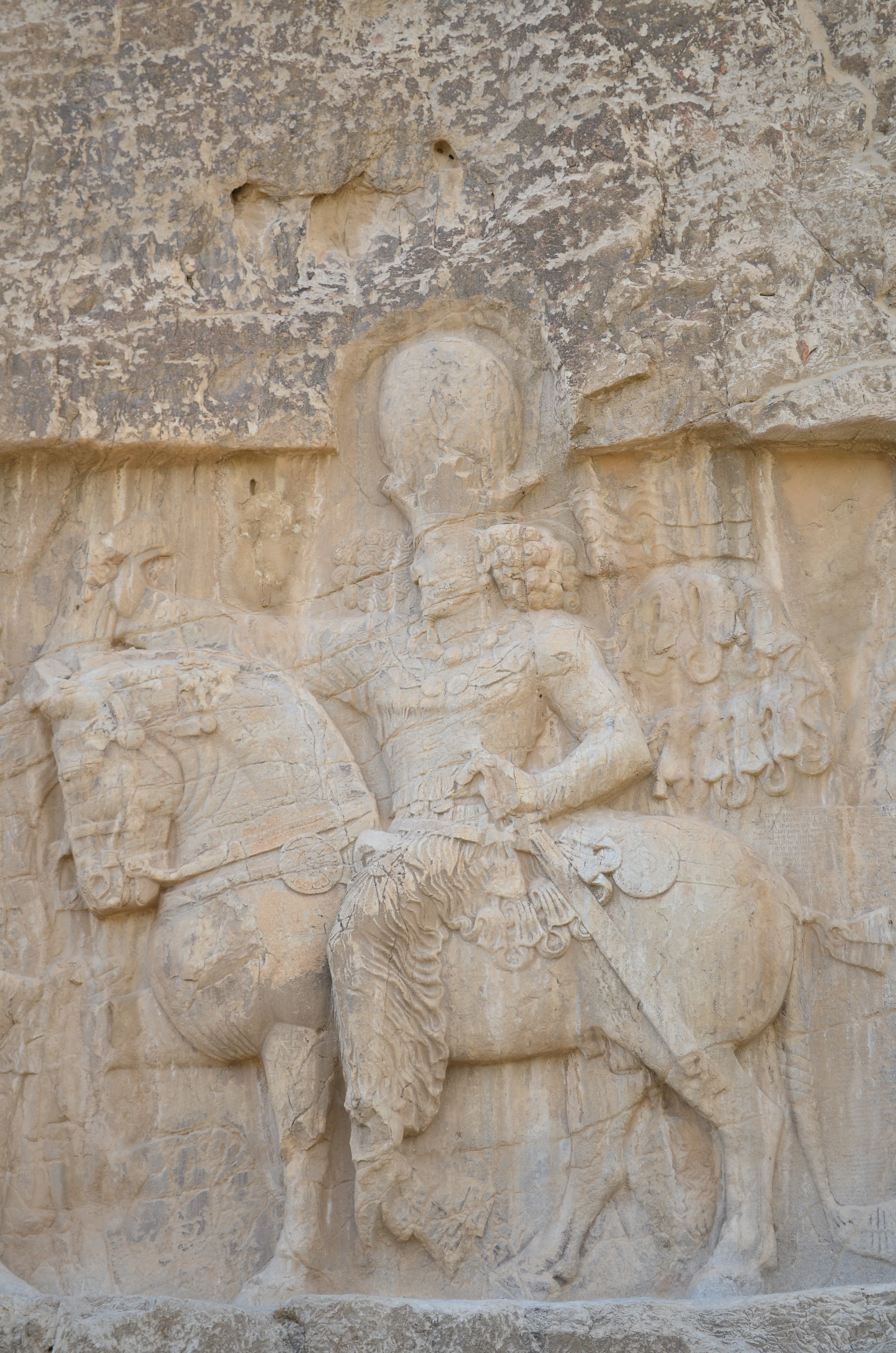
Shapur I on horseback

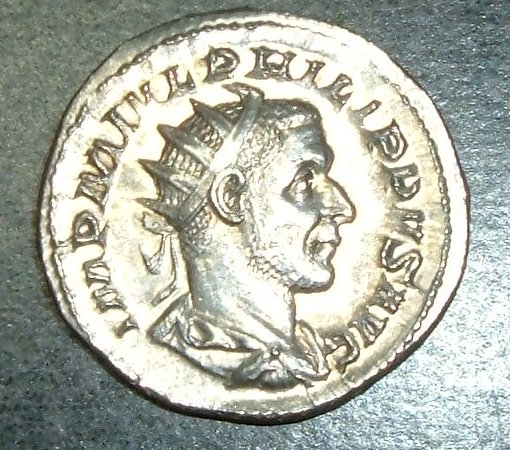
Coin of Emperor Philip the Arab.
