= Nahavand =

City in Hamadan province, Iran

Nahavand Persian: نهاوند
- City
- Location within Iran
- Coordinates: 34°11′34″N 48°22′23″E
- Country: Iran
- Province: Hamadan
- County: Nahavand
- District: Central

Population (2016)
  - Total: 76,162
- Time zone: UTC+3:30 (IRST)

Nahavand (Persian: نهاوند) (Note: Also romanized as Nahāvand and Nehāvend; also known as Nīhāvand) is a city in the Central District of Nahavand County, Hamadan province, Iran, serving as capital of both the county and the district. It is south of the city of Hamadan, west of Malayer and northwest of Borujerd.

Inhabited continuously since prehistoric times, Nahavand was bestowed upon the House of Karen in the Sasanian period. During the Muslim conquest of Persia, it was the site of the famous Battle of Nahavand.

== Etymology ==
The name Nahāvand is probably ultimately derived from Old Persian *Niθāvanta-, related to the Old Persian name Nisāya, itself derived from the prefix ni-, meaning "down" and a second element which is related to Avestan si or say, meaning "to lie down".

It has been spelled differently in different books and sources: Nahavand, Nahavend, Nahawand, Nahaavand, Nihavand, Nehavand, Nihavend, or Nehavend, formerly called Mah-Nahavand, and in antiquity Laodicea (Greek: Λαοδίκεια; Arabic Ladhiqiyya), also transliterated Laodiceia and Laodikeia, Laodicea in Media, Laodicea in Persis, Antiochia in Persis, Antiochia of Chosroes (Greek: Αντιόχεια του Χοσρόη), Antiochia in Media (Greek: Αντιόχεια της Μηδίας), Nemavand and Niphaunda.

== Prehistory ==
Excavations conducted in 1931/2 at Tepe Giyan by Georges Contenau and Roman Ghirshman led to the conclusion that Nahavand and its environs have been inhabited since prehistoric times. It showed that the site of Tepe Giyan, which lies c. 10 kilometers southeast of Nahavand, was occupied from at least 5,000 BC to c. 1,000 BC.

== History ==
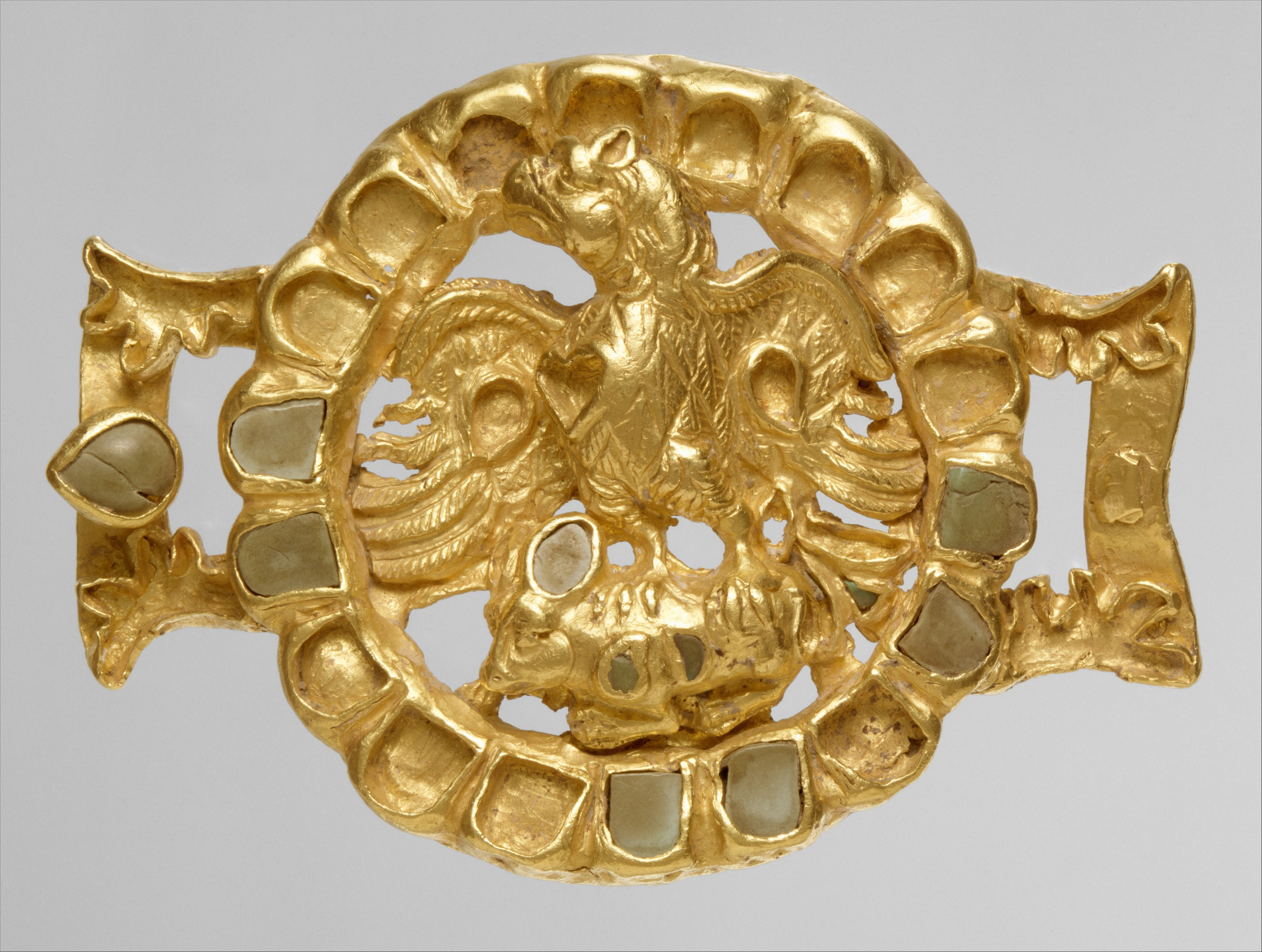
Matching gold clasp with eagle in the Metropolitan Museum of Art found in Nahavand, believed by Ernst Herzfeld to originally belong to the House of Karen.

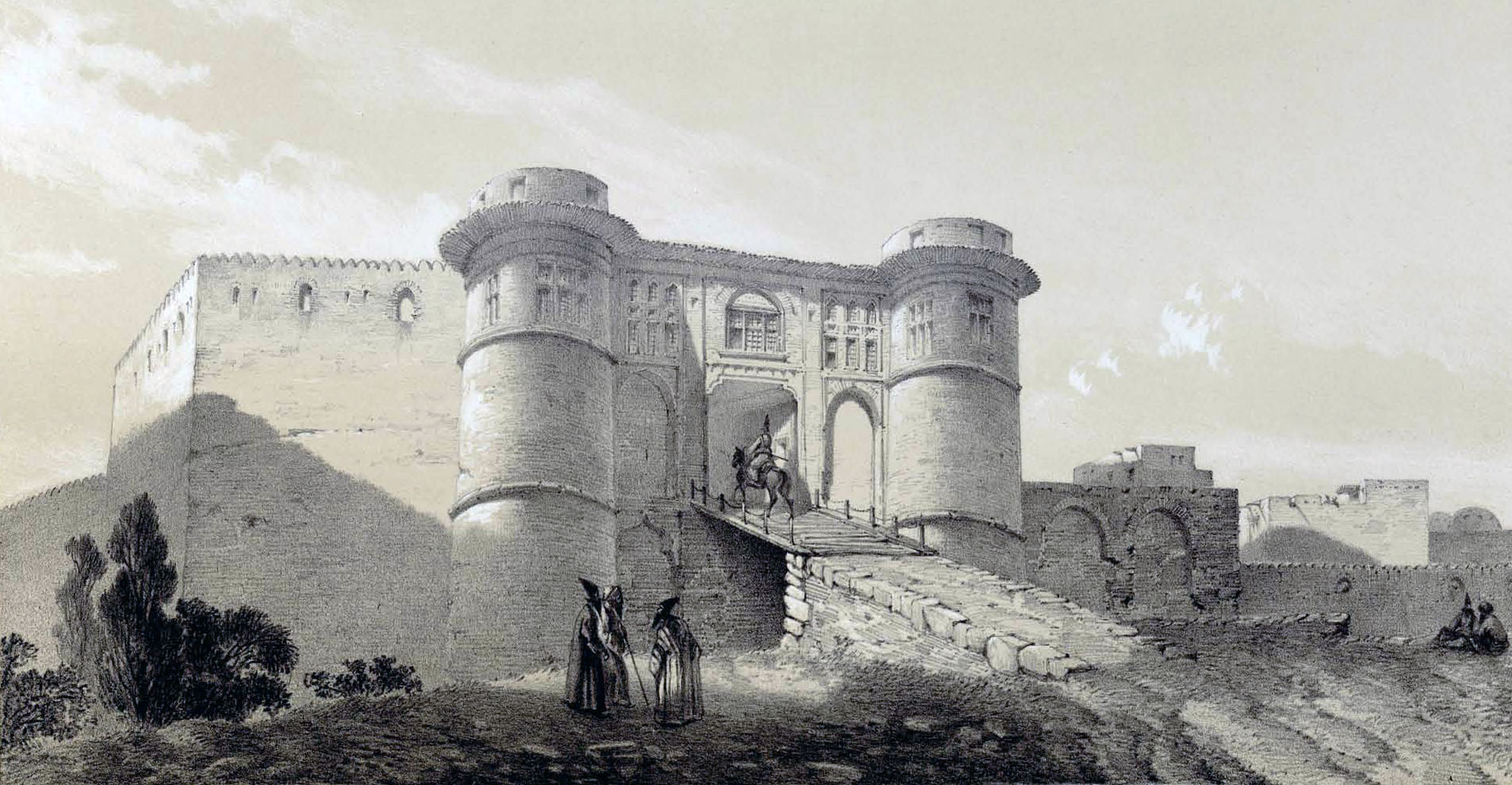
Nahavand Castle by Eugène Flandin (19th century drawing)

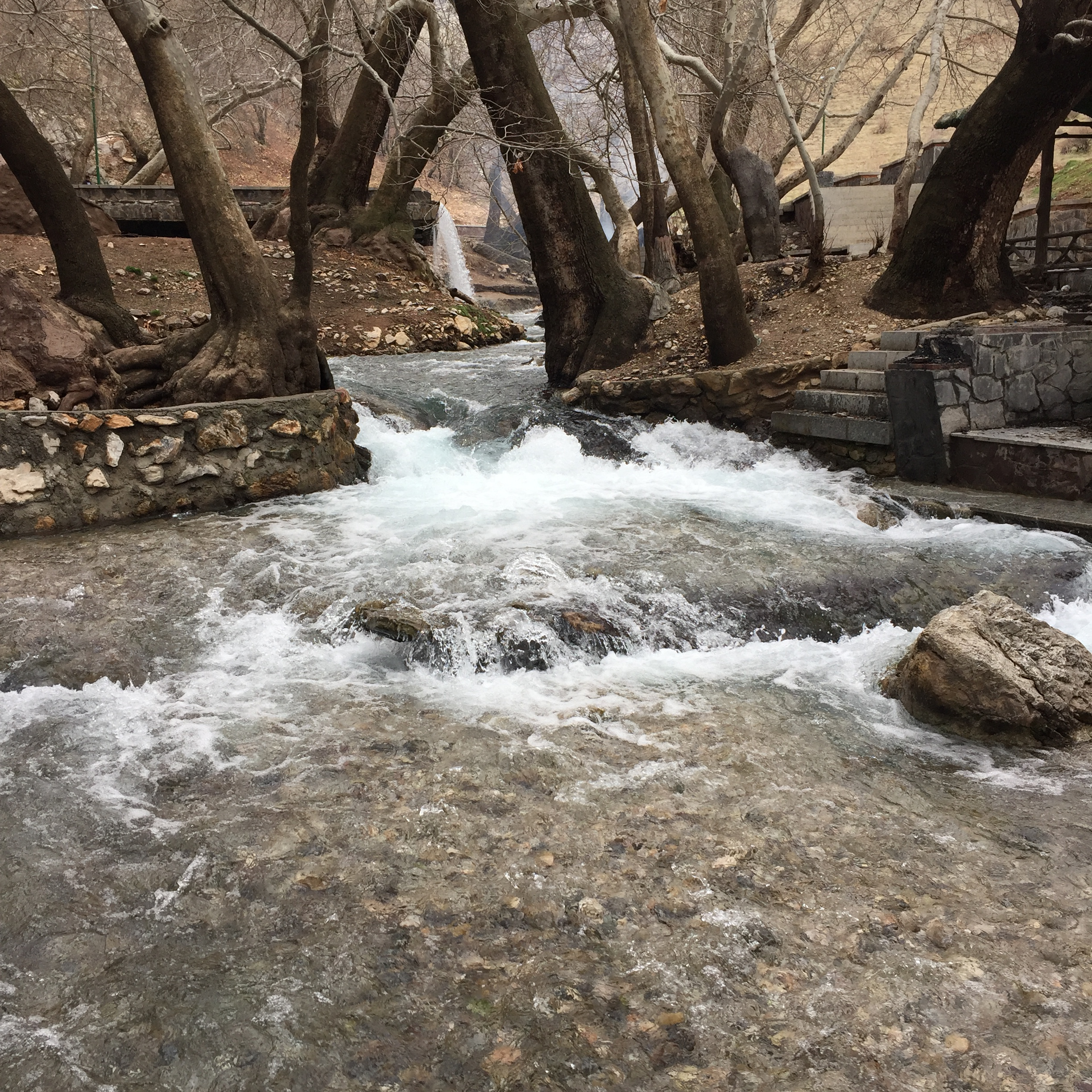
Giyan Spring

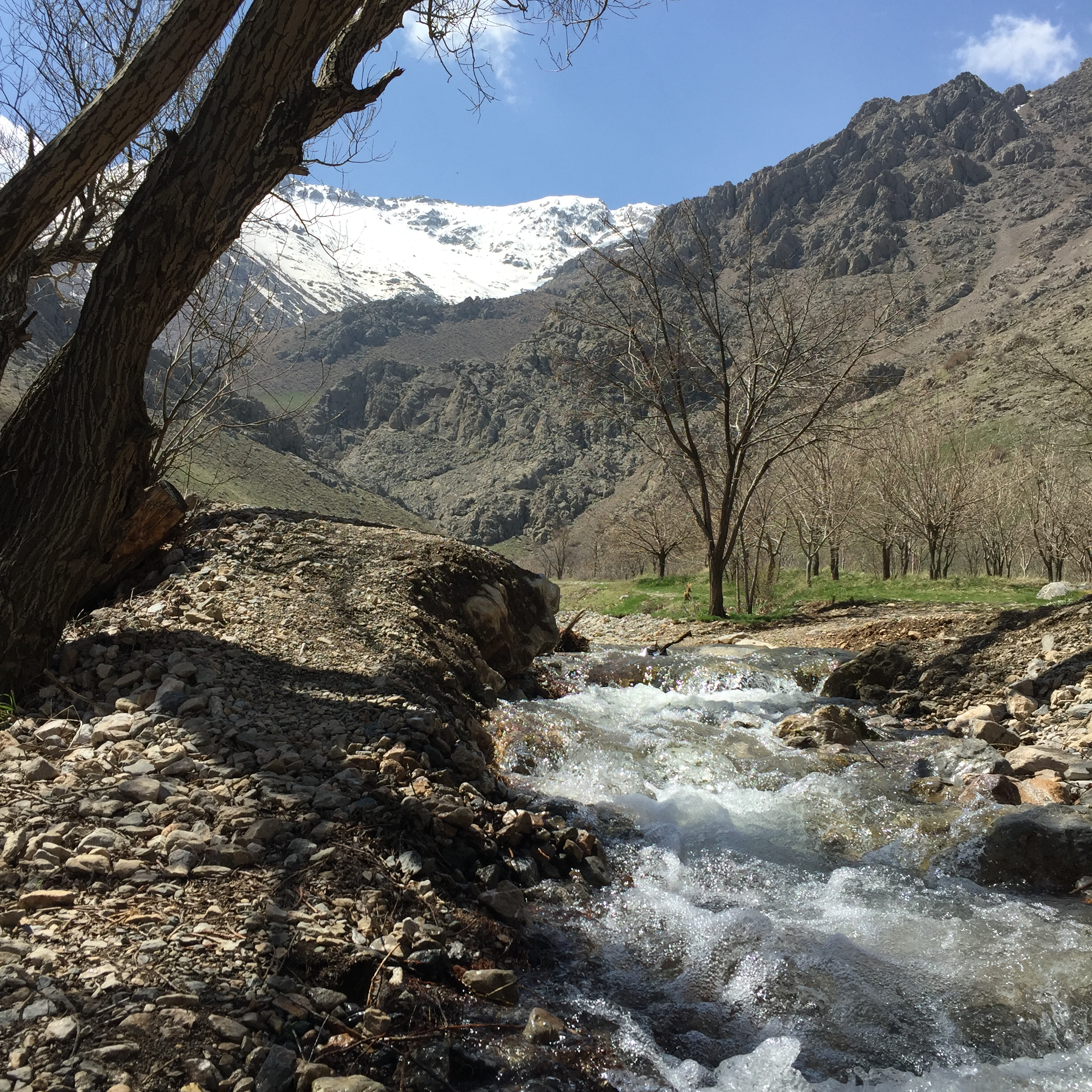
Faresban Spring

During the Achaemenid period (550–330 BC), Nahavand was located in the southernmost part of Media, on the fertile Nisaean plain. The ancient geographer and historian Strabo wrote that it was "(re-)founded" by Achaemenid King Xerxes the Great (r. 486–465 BC). It lay c. 96 kilometers from Ecbatana (modern-day Hamadan), on the trunk road from Babylonia through Media to Bactria. In the Seleucid period, Nahavand was turned into a Greek polis with magistrates and a Seleucid governor. In the 20th century, a stone stele was found near Nahavand. The stele bore a copy of the dynastic cult inscription of Seleucid ruler Antiochus III the Great (r. 222–187 BC), which he had created for his wife, Queen Laodice III. The stele, dated to 193 BC, revealed the terminus ante quem of the foundation of the Greek polis of Laodiceia. According to the polymath Abu Hanifa Dinawari, who flourished in the 9th century, in the Parthian period, Nahavand was the seat of the Parthian prince Artabanus, who later reigned as Artabanus I of Parthia (r. 127–124/3 BC). During the Sasanian period, the district of Nahavand was bestowed upon the House of Karen. There was also a fire temple in the city.

In 642, during the Arab conquest of Iran, a famous battle was fought at Nahavand. With heavy losses on both sides, it eventually resulted in a Sasanian defeat, and as such, opened up the doors of the Iranian plateau to the invaders. In the early Islamic period, Nahavand flourished as part of the province of Jibal. It first functioned as administrative center of the Mah al-Basra ("Media of the Basrans") district. Its revenues were reportedly used for the payment of the troops from Basra that were stationed in Nahavand. Medieval geographers mention Nahavand as an affluent commercial hub with two Friday mosques. When the 10th-century Arab traveller Abu Dulaf travelled through Nahavand, he noted "fine remains of the [ancient] Persians". Abu Dulaf also wrote that during the reign of Caliph al-Ma'mun (813–833), a treasure chamber had been found, containing two gold caskets.

In the course of the subsequent centuries, only few events in Nahavand were recorded. The Persian vizier of the Seljuk Empire, Nizam al-Mulk, was assassinated in 1092 near Nahavand. According to the historian and geographer Hamdallah Mustawfi, who flourished in the 13th and 14th centuries, Nahavand was a town of medium size surrounded by fertile fields where corn, cotton and fruits were grown. Mustawfi added that its inhabitants were mainly Twelver Shia Kurds.

In 1589, during the Ottoman-Safavid War of 1578–1590, Ottoman general Cığalazade Yusuf Sinan Pasha built a fortress at Nahavand for future campaigns against Safavid Iran. By the Treaty of Constantinople (1590), the Safavids were forced to cede the city to the Turks. In 1602/3, Nahavand's citizens revolted against the Ottoman occupiers. Coinciding with the Celali revolts in Anatolia, the Safavids recaptured Nahavand and expelled the Ottomans from the city, thus restoring Iranian control. The Safavid governor of Hamadan, Hasan Khan Ustajlu, subsequently destroyed the Ottoman fort. In the wake of the collapse of the Safavids in 1722, the Turks captured Nahavand once more. In 1730, they were ousted by Nader-Qoli Beg (later known as Nader Shah; r. 1736–1747). Nader's death in 1747 led to instability. Over the next few years, Nahavand was exploited by local Bakhtiari chiefs. In c. 1752, Karim Khan Zand defeated the Bakhtiari chieftain Ali Mardan Khan Bakhtiari at Nahavand.

== Demographics ==
=== Languages ===
The local language of the city is the Nahavandi sub-dialect of the northern dialect of the Luri language. This dialect is one of the closest dialects to the Middle Persian language, and is occasionally considered a distinct language. In addition to the Lurs, the Luri language was also spoken by some ethnic Persians in Nahavand.

Southern Kurdish is also spoken in Nahavand.

=== Population ===
At the time of the 2006 National Census, the city's population was 72,218 in 19,419 households. The following census in 2011 counted 75,445 people in 22,672 households. The 2016 census measured the population of the city as 76,162 people in 23,947 households.

== Geography ==
=== Location ===
Nahavand is situated in the west of Iran, in the northern part of the Zagros region. It lies c. 90 kilometers south of Hamadan, from which it is separated by the massif of the Alvand subrange. This massif grants Nahavand and its hinterlands an abundant water supply. Historically, Nahavand was located on a route that led from central Iraq through Kermanshah to northern Iran, and was therefore often crossed by armies. Another historic road, coming from Kermanshah, leads towards Isfahan in central Iran and avoids the Alvand massif. Nahavand also lies on the branch of the Gamasab river which comes from the southeast from the vicinity of Borujerd; from Nahavand the Gamasab river flows westwards to Mount Behistun. Given Nahavand's location, it was the site of several battles, and was considered important in Iranian history during Iran's wars with its western neighbors.

=== Climate ===
Nahavand has a Mediterranean climate (Köppen climate classification Csa).

Climate data for Nahavand (elevation:1,680.9 m (5,515 ft), 1996-2005 normals)
Month	Jan	Feb	Mar	Apr	May	Jun	Jul	Aug	Sep	Oct	Nov	Dec	Year
Daily mean °C (°F)	0.8 (33.4)	3.3 (37.9)	7.3 (45.1)	12.7 (54.9)	16.9 (62.4)	22.3 (72.1)	26.0 (78.8)	26.0 (78.8)	21.1 (70.0)	15.8 (60.4)	8.6 (47.5)	4.8 (40.6)	13.8 (56.8)
Average precipitation mm (inches)	56.1 (2.21)	40.4 (1.59)	86.7 (3.41)	53.9 (2.12)	22.8 (0.90)	1.1 (0.04)	1.1 (0.04)	0.3 (0.01)	2.0 (0.08)	14.2 (0.56)	46.3 (1.82)	51.3 (2.02)	376.2 (14.8)
Source: IRIMO

== Music ==
Nahavand also gives its name to the musical mode (maqam) Nahawand in Arabic, Persian and Turkish music. This mode is known for its wide variety of Western sounding melodies.

== Notable people ==
- Abu Lu'lu'a Firuz (d. 644, Nahavandi origin uncertain), craftsman and slave who killed the second caliph Umar
- Benjamin Nahawandi, a key figure in the development of Karaite Judaism in the early Middle Ages
- Ahmad Nahavandi, 8th-century astronomer who worked at the Academy of Gundishapur
- Ali Younesi, Shia Cleric
- Ali Qoddusi, Shia Cleric

== See also ==
Media related to Nahavand at Wikimedia Commons

== Sources ==
- Blow, David (2009). Shah Abbas: The Ruthless King Who became an Iranian Legend. London, UK: I.B.Tauris. ISBN 978-1845119898. LCCN 2009464064.
- Bosworth, C. Edmund (2000). "NEHĀVAND". Encyclopaedia Iranica.
- Floor, Willem (2008). Titles and Emoluments in Safavid Iran: A Third Manual of Safavid Administration, by Mirza Naqi Nasiri. Washington, D.C.: Mage Publishers. ISBN 978-1933823232.
- Herzfeld, Ernst (1928). "The Hoard of the Kâren Pahlavs". The Burlington Magazine for Connoisseurs. 52 (298). Journal of Near Eastern Studies, vol. 52, no. 298: 21–27. JSTOR 863510.
- Minorsky, Vladimir (1995). "Nihāwand". In Bosworth, C. E.; van Donzel, E.; Heinrichs, W. P. & Lecomte, G. (eds.). The Encyclopaedia of Islam, Second Edition. Volume VIII: Ned–Sam. Leiden: E. J. Brill. ISBN 978-90-04-09834-3.
- Negahban, Ezat O. (2001). "GIYAN TEPE". Encyclopaedia Iranica, Vol. XI, Fasc. 6-7.
- Randel, Don Michael, ed. (2003). The Harvard Dictionary of Music (4 ed.). Harvard University Press. ISBN 978-0674011632.
- Rougemont, G. (2016). "Que sait-on d’Antioche de Perside?" Studi Ellenistici 30, 197–215.
- Sherwin-White, Susan Mary; Wiesehöfer, Josef (2012). "Laodicea-Nihavend". In Hornblower, Simon; Spawforth, Antony; Eidinow, Esther (eds.). The Oxford Classical Dictionary (4 ed.). Oxford University Press. ISBN 978-0-19-954556-8.
- Webb, Peter (2018). "Nihawand, Battle of". In Nicholson, Oliver (ed.). The Oxford Dictionary of Late Antiquity. Oxford: Oxford University Press. ISBN 978-0-19-866277-8.
- Wiesehöfer, Josef (2006). "Nihāwand". In Salazar, Christine F.; Landfester, Manfred; Gentry, Francis G. (eds.). Brill's New Pauly. Brill Online.
