= Gilabad, Hamadan =

Village in Hamadan province, Iran

Gilabad Persian: گيل اباد
- Village
- Location within Iran
- Coordinates: 34°11′57″N 48°14′35″E
- Country: Iran
- Province: Hamadan
- County: Nahavand
- District: Giyan
- Rural District: Sarab

Population (2016)
  - Total: 1,550
- Time zone: UTC+3:30 (IRST)

Gilabad (Persian: گيل اباد) (Note: Also romanized as Gīlābād; also known as Gelābad) is a village in Sarab Rural District of Giyan District in Nahavand County, Hamadan province, Iran.

== Demographics ==
=== Population ===
At the time of the 2006 National Census, the village's population was 1,878 in 514 households. The following census in 2011 counted 1,882 people in 550 households. The 2016 census measured the population of the village as 1,550 people in 508 households.
