= Sarab Rural District (Nahavand County) =

Rural district in Hamadan province, Iran

Sarab Rural District Persian: دهستان سراب
- Rural District
- Location within Iran
- Coordinates: 34°09′N 48°12′E
- Country: Iran
- Province: Hamadan
- County: Nahavand
- District: Giyan
- Established: 2004
- Capital: Mianabad

Population (2016)
  - Total: 5,978
- Time zone: UTC+3:30 (IRST)

Sarab Rural District (Persian: دهستان سراب) is in Giyan District of Nahavand County, Hamadan province, Iran. Its capital is the village of Mianabad.

== Demographics ==
=== Population ===
At the time of the 2006 National Census, the rural district's population was 6,486 in 1,591 households. There were 6,671 inhabitants in 1,895 households at the following census of 2011. The 2016 census measured the population of the rural district as 5,978 in 1,855 households. The most populous of its six villages was Mianabad, with 1,830 people.

=== Other villages in the rural district ===
- Asadabad
- Gilabad
- Mahanabad
- Varazaneh
- Zafarabad
