= Tepe Giyan =

Archeological site in the Zagros Mountains, Iran

- تپه گیان (Persian)
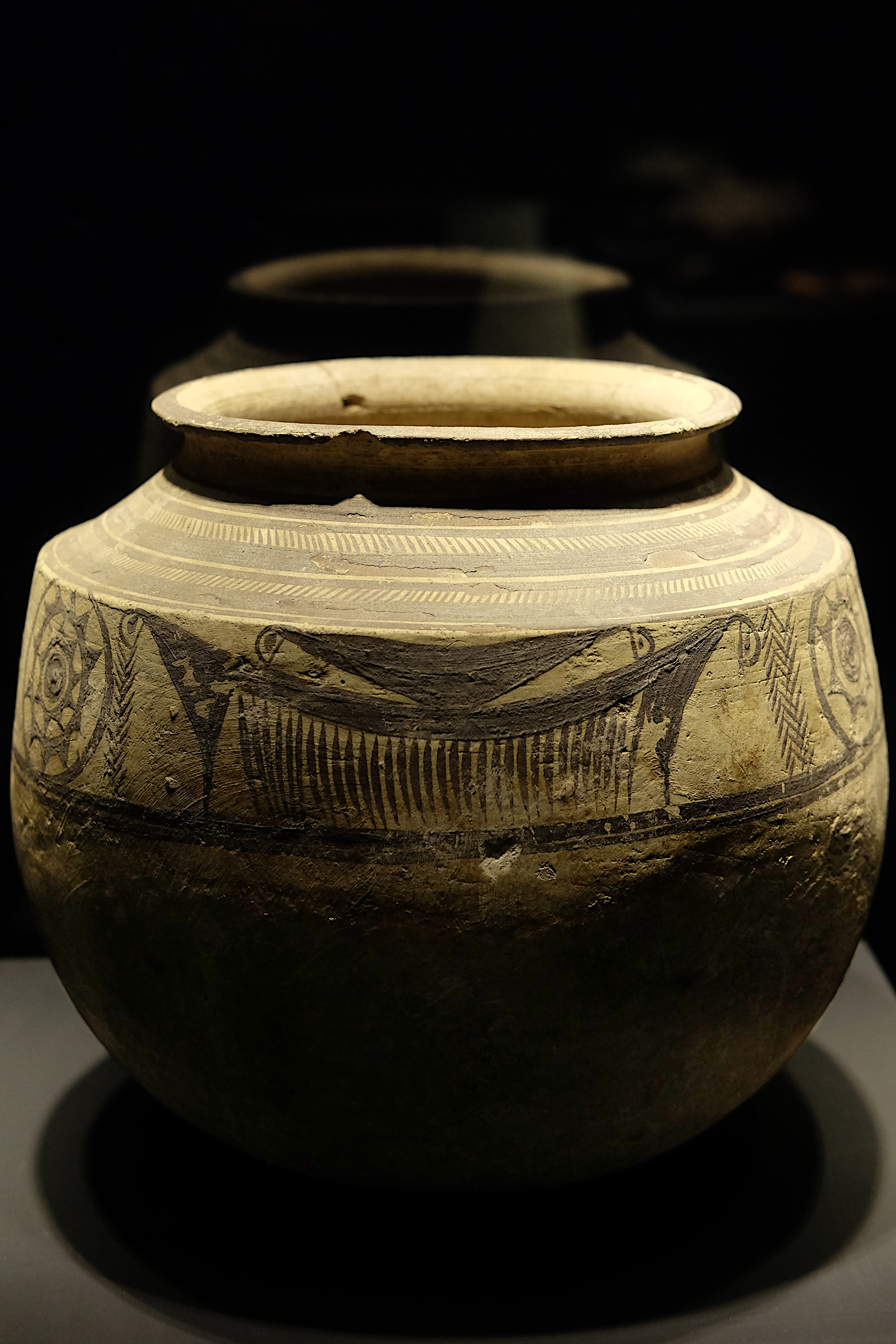
- Tepe Giyan IV storage jar - End of 3rd millennium, beginning of 2nd millennium BCE. Tepe Giyan IV. Royal Museums of Art and History - Brussels

- Location within Iran
- 34°10′53″N 48°14′37″E
- Type: Settlement
- Location: Giyan, Iran

Site notes
- Excavation dates: 1931–1932, 2011
- Archaeologists: George Contenau, Roman Ghirshman, Ali Khaksar
- Condition: In ruins

Iran National Heritage List
- Official name: Tappeh Giyan
- Type: Mound
- Designated: 1931
- Reference no.: 36
- Conservation organization: Cultural Heritage, Handicrafts and Tourism Organization of Iran

Tepe Gyan is an archaeological site in the highland central Zagros Mountains in Iran. Tepe Giyan contains a necropolis of 123 graves and distinctive pottery which displays some affinities with the ceramics found at another Elamite site of Tepe Sialk.

Tepe Giyan was first excavated by French archaeologists George Contenau and Roman Ghirshman, with the support of the Musées Nationaux and the École du Louvre, in 1931–32. In 2011, the Tepe Giyan archeological team led by Ali Khaksar discovered a unique Bronze Age burial of a 40-year-old man whose skeleton had bronze rings placed on the maxilla and mandible (upper and lower jaw bones) (Azandaryani, E. H. and A . Khaksar 2013).

== Archaeology ==
Excavations began in 1931. Sealings were discovered.

== History of occupation ==
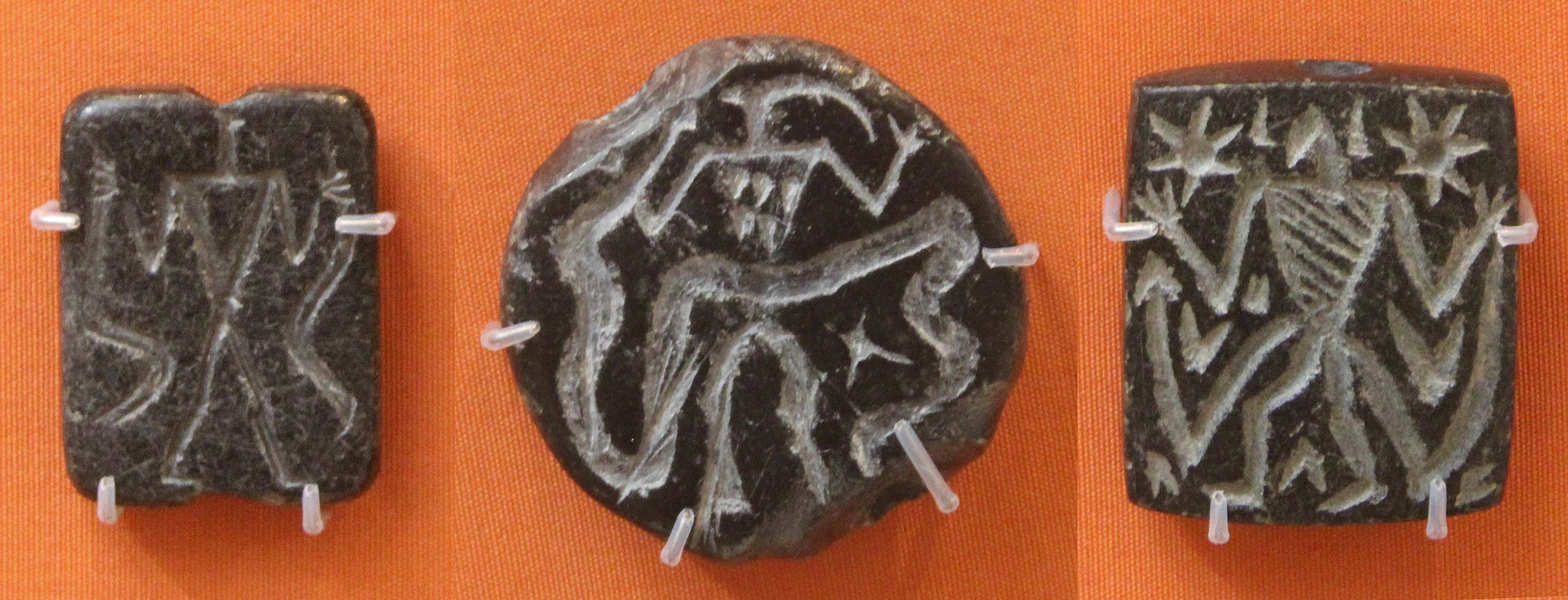
"Master of Animals" stamp seals, Tepe Giyan, Iran, 5000-4000 BCE.

The phase of Giyan V (6th-4th millennium BCE) shows ceramic styles with some connections with the region of Susa.

The phase of Giyan IV (End of 3rd millennium, beginning of 2nd millennium BCE) delivers ceramic in abundance. The jars are generally decorated with raised bands in horizontal and wavy raised bands. Only the neck of the jar is painted, the rest is blank. The most significant motifs in this phase are pairs of birds with wings spread in the shape of a comb and rows of sawtooth patterns.

The phase of Tepe Giyan III dates to the period 2000/1900 - 1600 BCE, with specific types of ceramics.

The phase of Tepe Giyan I (1400 — 1100 BCE) shows that iron was still rather scarce in this site and in the areas, a Persia in general at that time, with only a few daggers, spear-heads and arrow-heads, rings and bracelets being found.

== Necropolis ==
The site is mainly known as a necropolis of 121 graves. In 2011, Mr. Khaksar's archeological team discovered a unique burial specimen that had been operated on the cheeks and knees of a bronze ring skeleton of a 40-year-old man. The archaeologist named this grave Grave No. 123. A complete description of the study on an ancient book written by Mr. Ali Akbar Kiani, Ancient Land Gyan. It bears similarities with the site of Tepe Sialk, in the same general area, and its oldest ceramics are also related to the Ubaid period in Mesopotamia.

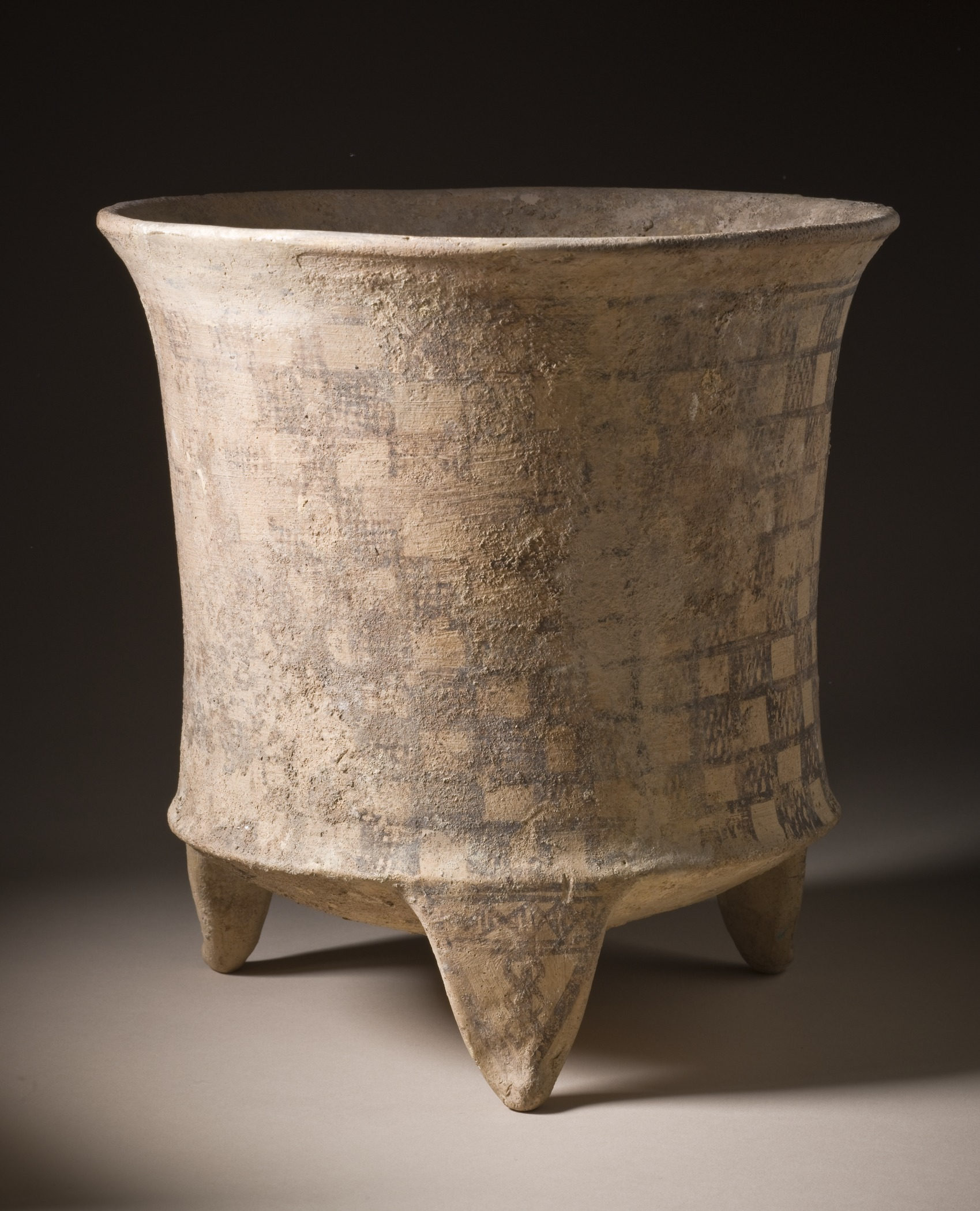
Footed Urn, 3rd millennium BCE

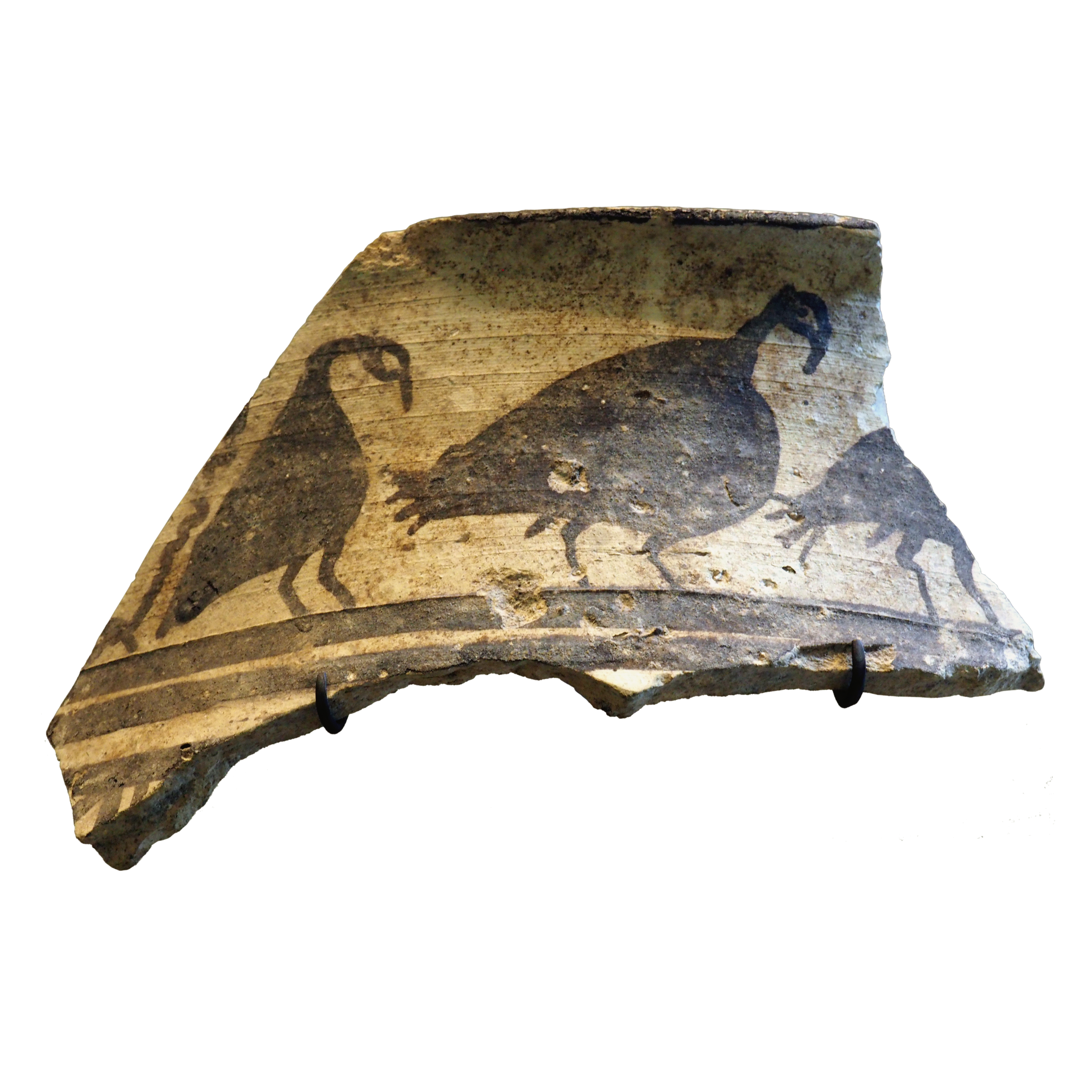
Potsherd ornated with bustards. Tepe Giyan, 1800-1500 BCE
