= Sorkha Lijeh, Kermanshah =

Sorkha Lijeh سرخه ليجه
- Village
- Location within Iran
- Coordinates: 34°40′07″N 47°44′02″E
- Country: Iran
- Province: Kermanshah
- County: Sonqor
- Bakhsh: Central
- Rural District: Parsinah

Population (2006)
  - Total: 261
- Time zone: UTC+3:30 (IRST)
  - Summer (DST): UTC+4:30 (IRDT)

Sorkha Lijeh (Persian: سُرخه ليجه، سُرخه ليژه, also Romanized as Sorkheh Lījeh and Sorkhelījeh) is a village in Parsinah Rural District, in the Central District of Sonqor County, Kermanshah Province, Iran. At the 2006 census, its population was 261, in 52 families.
