= Media (region) =

Ancient region located in northwestern Iran

Coordinates: 37°N 47°E

Media 𐎶𐎠𐎭
- Historical region of Iran
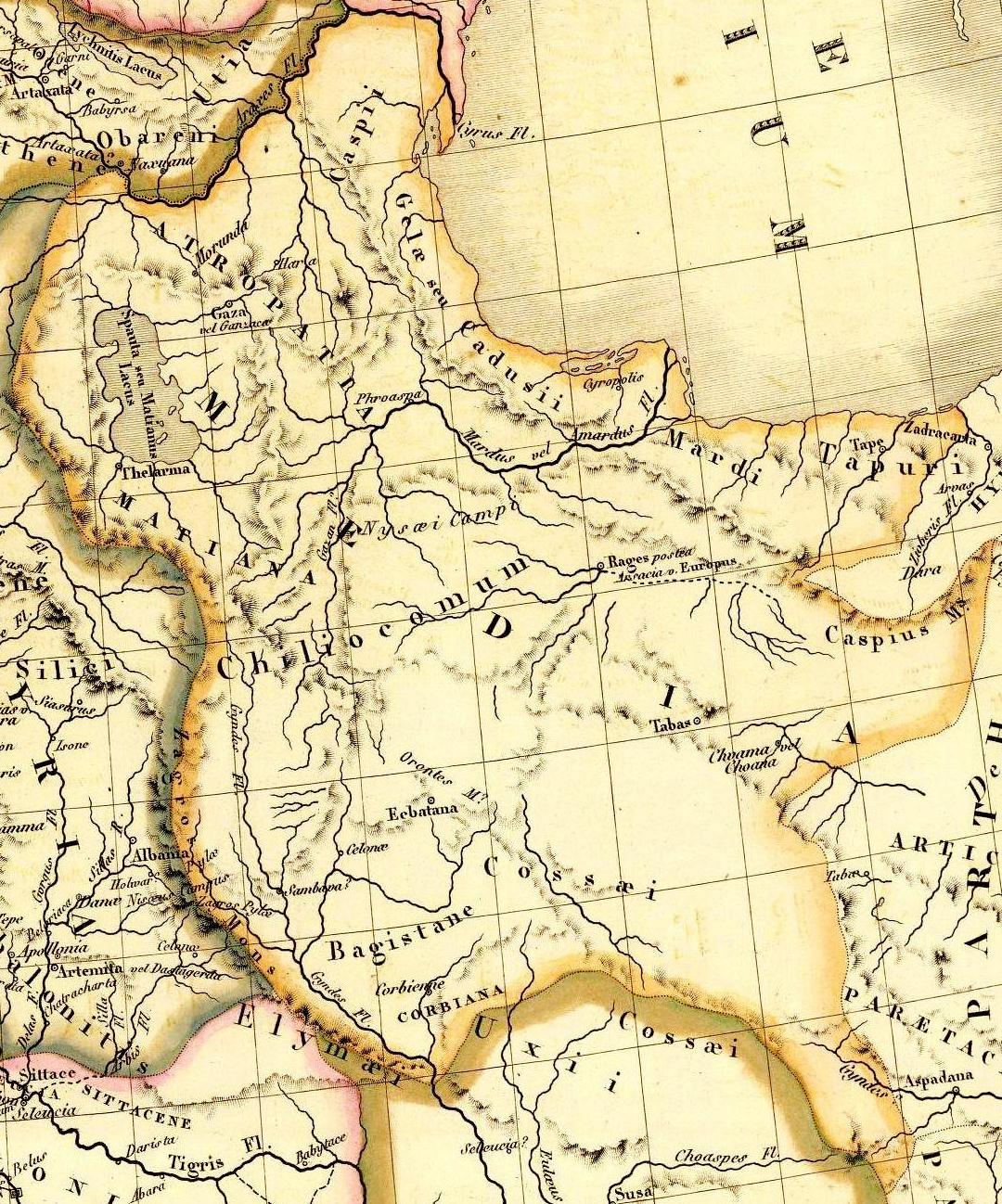
- The regional origin of the Medes
- Capital: Ecbatana
- History
  - Establishment of the Medes: c. 678 BC
  - Fall of the Median dynasty: c. 549 BC
Preceded by
Neo-Assyrian Empire
- Today part of: Iran

Medes (region)

Media (Note: Old Persian: 𐎶𐎠𐎭, romanized: Māda; Middle Persian: Mād) is an Iron Age region of northwestern Iran, best known for having been the political and cultural base of the Medes. (Note: A)"..and the Medes (Iranians of what is now north-west Iran).." EIEC (1997:30). B) "Archaeological evidence for the religion of the Iranian-speaking Medes of the .." (Diakonoff 1985, p. 140). C) ".. succeeded in uniting into a kingdom the many Iranian-speaking Median tribes" ( from Encyclopædia Britannica). D) "Proto-Iranian split into Western (Median, ancient Persian, and others) and Eastern (Scythian, Ossetic, Saka, Pamir and others)..." (Kuz'mina, Elena E. (2007), The origin of the Indo-Iranians, J. P. Mallory (ed.), BRILL, p. 303, ISBN 978-90-04-16054-5) ...) During the Achaemenid period, it comprised present-day Iranian Azerbaijan, Iranian Kurdistan and western Tabaristan. As a satrapy under Achaemenid rule, it would eventually encompass a wider region, stretching to southern Dagestan in the north. However, after the wars of Alexander the Great, the northern parts were separated due to the Partition of Babylon and became known as Atropatene, while the remaining region became known as Lesser Media.

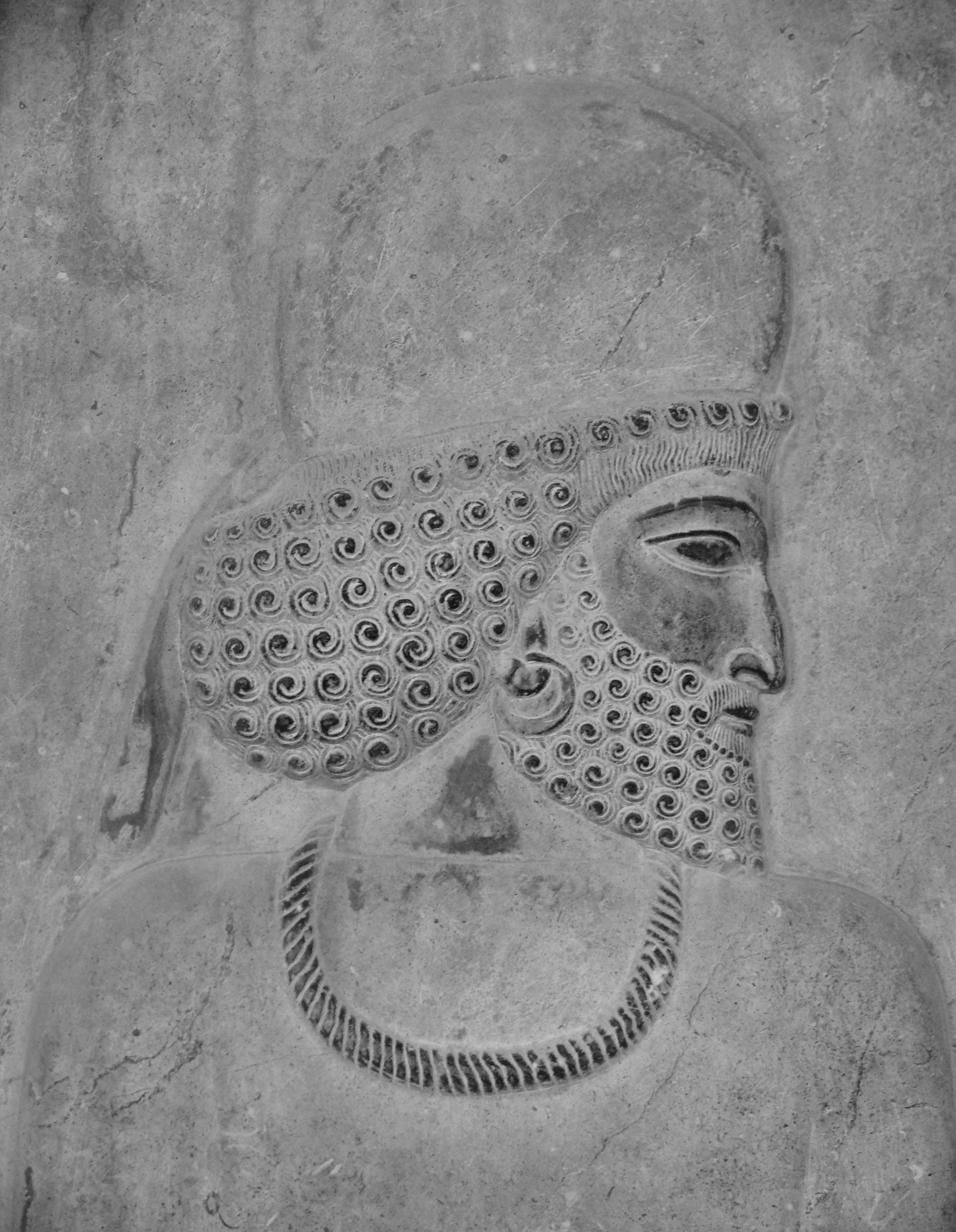
Rock relief of a Median man, Persepolis

== History ==
=== Under the Medes ===
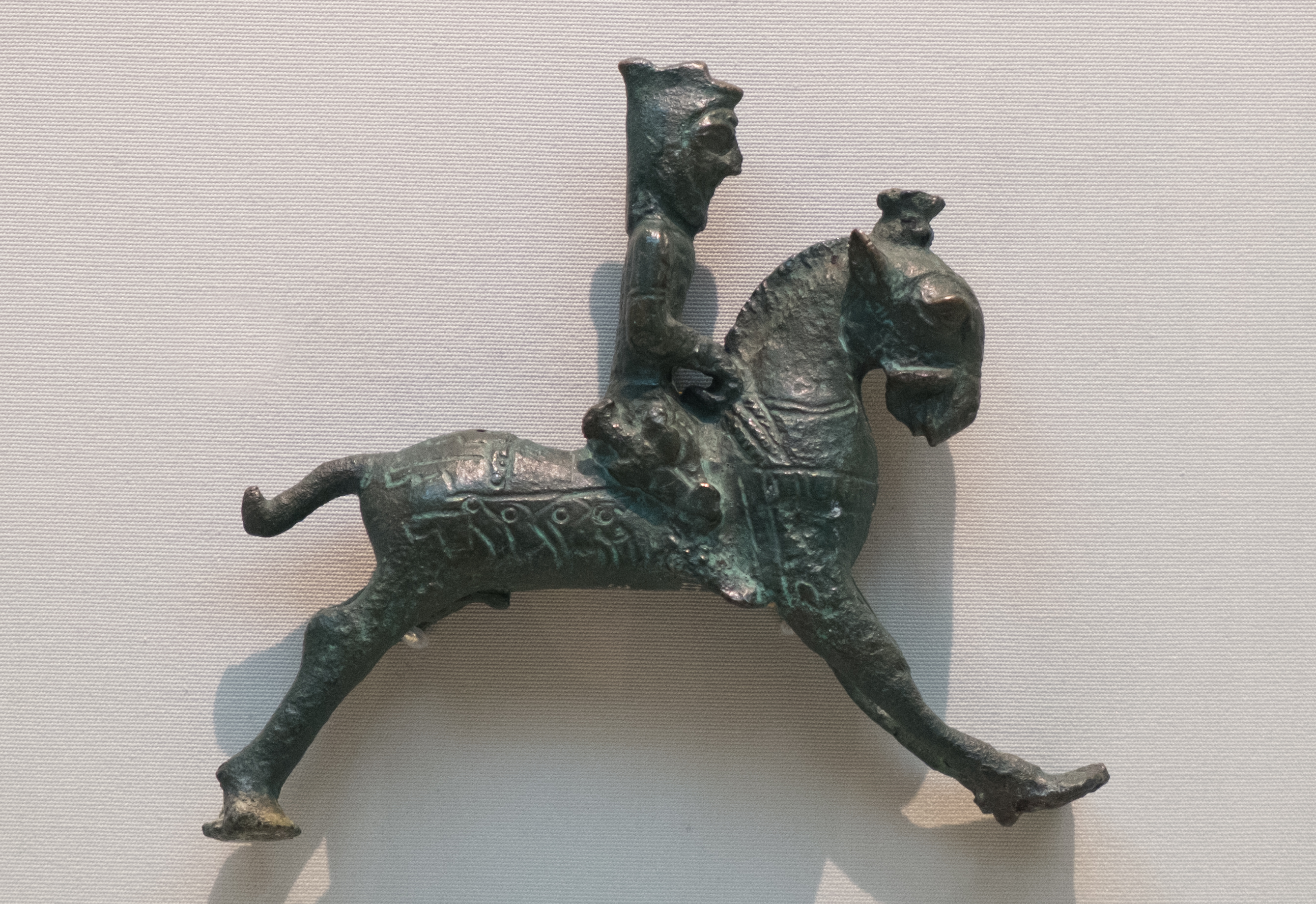
Horseman in "Median dress". Achaemenid art, 6th-4th century BC. British Museum.

In 678 BC, Deioces united the Median tribes of Media and made the first Iranian Empire. His grandson Cyaxares managed to unite all Iranian tribes of Ancient Iran and made his empire a major power. When Cyaxares died he was succeeded by his son, Astyages, who was the last king of the Median Empire.

=== Under the Achaemenids ===
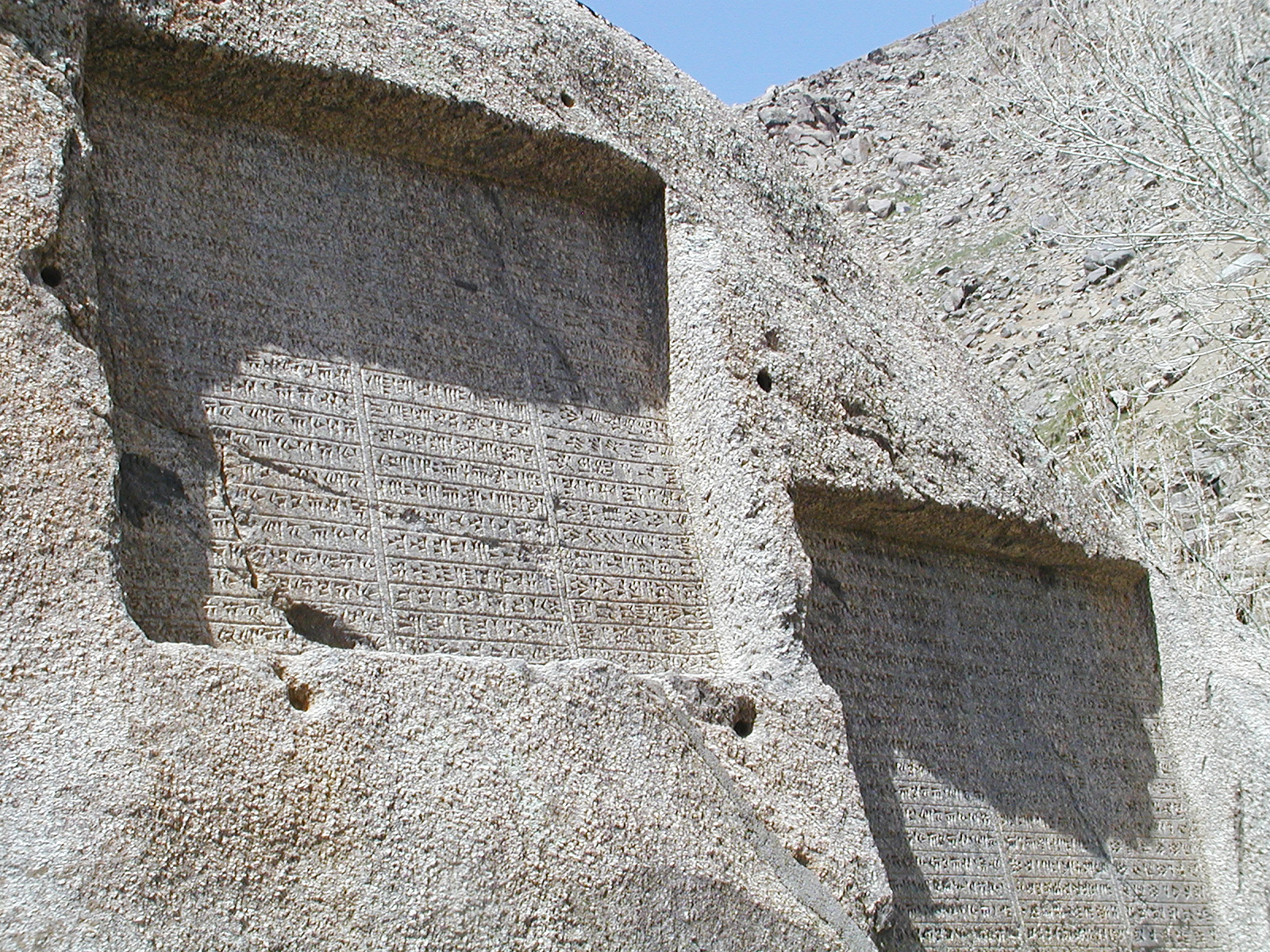
The Ganj Nameh (lit.: Treasure epistle) in Ecbatana. The inscriptions are by Darius I and his son Xerxes I

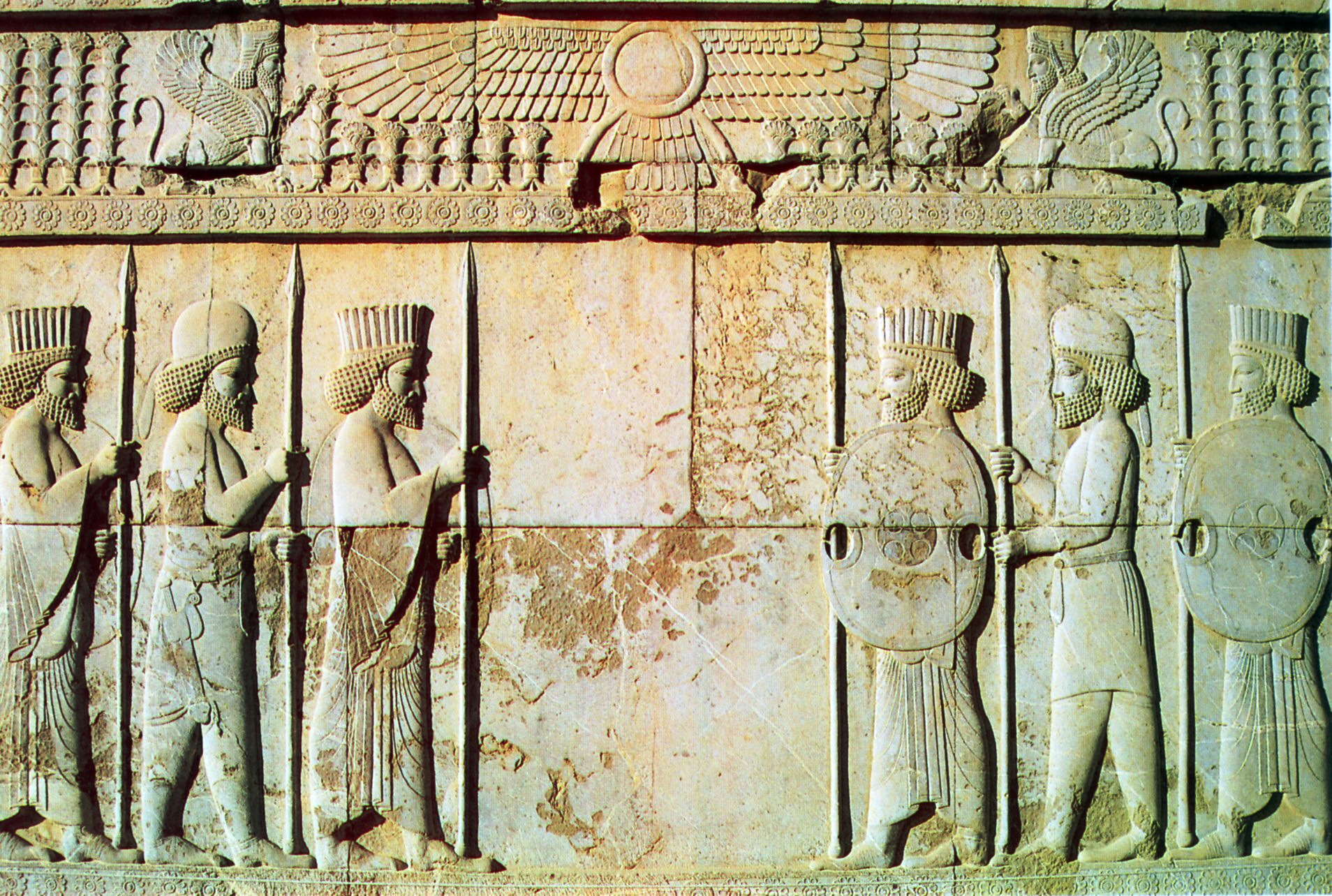
Apadana Hall, 5th-century BC carving of Persian and Median soldiers in traditional costume (Medians are wearing rounded hats and boots)

In 553 BC, Cyrus the Great, King of Persia, rebelled against his grandfather, the Median King, Astyages son of Cyaxares; he finally won a decisive victory in 550 BC resulting in Astyages' capture by his own dissatisfied nobles, who promptly turned him over to the triumphant Cyrus.

After Cyrus's victory against Astyages, the Medes were subjected to their close kin, the Persians. In the new empire they retained a prominent position; in honor and war, they stood next to the Persians; their court ceremony was adopted by the new sovereigns, who in the summer months resided in Ecbatana; and many noble Medes were employed as officials, satraps and generals. At the beginning the Greek historians referred to the Achaemenid Empire as a Median Empire.

After the assassination of the usurper Smerdis, a Mede Fravartish (Phraortes), claiming to be a scion of Cyaxares, tried to restore the Mede kingdom, but was defeated by the Persian generals and executed in Ecbatana (Darius I in the Behistun inscription). Another rebellion, in 409 BC, against Darius II was of short duration. But the Iranian tribes to the north, especially the Cadusii, were always troublesome; many abortive expeditions of the later kings against them are mentioned.

Under Persian rule, the country was divided into two satrapies: the south, with Ecbatana and Rhagae (Rey near modern Tehran), Media proper, or Greater Media, as it is often called, formed in Darius I the Great's organization the eleventh satrapy, together with the Paricanians and Orthocorybantians; the north, the district of Matiane, together with the mountainous districts of the Zagros and Assyria proper (east of the Tigris) was united with the Alarodians and Saspirians in eastern Armenia, and formed the eighteenth satrapy.

Caucasian Albania (roughly comprising northeast of modern-day Azerbaijan and southern Dagestan) was rapidly incorporated by the Achaemenid Persians and were under the command of the satrapy of Media in the later period.

When the Persian empire decayed and the Cadusii and other mountainous tribes made themselves independent, eastern Armenia became a special satrapy, while Assyria seems to have been united with Media; therefore Xenophon in the Anabasis always designates Assyria by the name of "Media".

=== Under the Seleucids ===
Following Alexander's invasion of the satrapy of Media in the summer of 330 BC, he appointed as satrap a former general of Darius III the Great named Atropates (Atrupat) in 328 BC, according to Arrian. In the partition of his empire, southern Media was given to the Macedonian Peithon; but the north, far off and of little importance to the generals squabbling over Alexander's inheritance, was left to Atropates.

While southern Media, with Ecbatana, passed to the rule of Antigonus, and afterwards (about 310 BC) to Seleucus I, Atropates maintained himself in his own satrapy and succeeded in founding an independent kingdom. Thus the partition of the country that Persia had introduced became lasting; the north was named Atropatene (in Pliny, Atrapatene; in Ptolemy, Tropatene), after the founder of the dynasty, a name still said to be preserved in the modern form 'Azerbaijan'.

The capital of Atropatene was Gazaca in the central plain, and the castle Phraaspa, discovered on the Araz river by archaeologists in April 2005.

Atropatene is that country of western Asia which was least of all other countries influenced by Hellenism. There exists not even a single coin of its rulers. Southern Media remained a province of the Seleucid Empire for a century and a half, and Hellenism was introduced everywhere. Media was surrounded everywhere by Greek towns, in pursuance of Alexander's plan to protect it from neighboring barbarians, according to Polybius. Only Ecbatana retained its old character. But Rhagae became the Greek town Europus; and with it Strabo names Laodicea, Apamea Heraclea or Achais. Most of them were founded by Seleucus I and his son Antiochus I.

=== Under the Arsacids ===
In 221 BC, the satrap Molon tried to make himself independent (there exist bronze coins with his name and the royal title), together with his brother Alexander, satrap of Persis, but they were defeated and killed by Antiochus the Great. In the same way, the Mede satrap Timarchus took the diadem and conquered Babylonia. On his coins he calls himself the great king Timarchus; but again the legitimate king, Demetrius I, succeeded in subduing the rebellion, and Timarchus was slain. But with Demetrius I, the dissolution of the Seleucid Empire began, brought about chiefly by the intrigues of the Romans, and shortly afterwards, in about 150, the Parthian king Mithradates I conquered Media. Antiochus VII Sidetes briefly reasserted Seleucid control over the region in 130 BC, but his defeat and death marked the final loss of Seleucid influence in Media.

From this time Media remained subject to the Arsacids or Parthians, who changed the name of Rhagae, or Europus, into Arsacia, and divided the country into five small provinces. From the Parthians, it passed in 226 to the Sassanids, together with Atropatene.

== Geography ==
Realms of Ancient Near East around 900 BC

An early description of Media from the end of the 9th century BC to the beginning of the 7th century BC comes from the Assyrians. The southern border of Media, in that period, is named as the Elamite region of Simaški in present-day Lorestan Province. To the west and northwest, Media was bounded by the Zagros Mountains and from the east by the Dasht-e Kavir desert. This region of Media was ruled by the Assyrians and for them the region fell "along the Great Khorasan Road from just east of Harhar to Alwand, and probably beyond." The location of Harhar is suggested to be "the central or eastern" Mahidasht District in Kermanshah Province.

Its borders were limited in the north by the non-Iranian states of Gizilbunda and Mannea, and to its south by Ellipi and Elam. Gizilbunda was located in the Qaflankuh Mountains, and Ellipi was located in the south of modern Lorestan Province. On the east and southeast of Media, as described by the Assyrians, another land with the name of "Patušarra" appears. This land was located near a mountain range which the Assyrians call "Bikni" and describe as "Lapis Lazuli Mountain". There are differing opinions on the location of this mountain. Mount Damavand of Tehran and Alvand of Hamadan are two proposed sites. This location is the most remote eastern area that the Assyrians knew of or reached during their expansion until the beginning of the 7th century BC.

In Achaemenid sources, specifically from the Behistun Inscription (2.76, 77–78), the capital of Media is Ecbatana, called "Hamgmatāna-" in Old Persian (Elamite: Agmadana-; Babylonian: Agamtanu-) corresponding to modern-day Hamadan. The other cities existing in Media were Laodicea (modern Nahavand) and the mound that was the largest city of the Medes, Rhages (present-day Rey). The fourth city of Media was Apamea, near Ecbatana, whose precise location is now unknown.

== Sources ==
- Diakonoff, I. M. (1985). "Media". In Gershevitch, Ilya (ed.). The Cambridge History of Iran. Vol. 2. Cambridge: Cambridge University Press. pp. 94–95. ISBN 978-0-521-20091-2.
- Levine, Louis D. (1974-01-01), "Geographical Studies in the Neo-Assyrian Zagros-II", Iran, 12: 99–124, doi:10.2307/4300506, ISSN 0578-6967, JSTOR 4300506
- Overtoom, Nikolaus Leo (2020). Reign of Arrows: The Rise of the Parthian Empire in the Hellenistic Middle East. Oxford University Press. ISBN 9780190888336.
