= Giyan District =

District in Hamadan province, Iran

Giyan District Persian: بخش گیان
- District
- Location within Iran
- Coordinates: 34°08′N 48°14′E
- Country: Iran
- Province: Hamadan
- County: Nahavand
- Established: 2004
- Capital: Giyan

Population (2016)
  - Total: 17,027
- Time zone: UTC+3:30 (IRST)

Giyan District (Persian: بخش گیان) is in Nahavand County, Hamadan province, Iran. Its capital is the city of Giyan.

== Demographics ==
=== Population ===
At the time of the 2006 National Census, the district's population was 17,253 in 4,304 households. The following census in 2011 counted 17,811 people in 5,086 households. The 2016 census measured the population of the district as 17,027 inhabitants in 5,238 households.

=== Administrative divisions ===
Giyan District Population
Administrative Divisions	2006	2011	2016
Giyan RD	2,705	3,038	2,863
Sarab RD	6,486	6,671	5,978
Giyan (city)	8,062	8,102	8,186
Total	17,253	17,811	17,027
RD = Rural District
