= Sasanian rock reliefs =

The concept of kingship in the early Sasanian Empire (224–651) was heavily influenced by rock reliefs, which had already existed as a major artistic style and royal tradition within ancient Iran and the rest of West Asia for centuries. The majority of Sasanian rock reliefs are concentrated in Pars (Fars), the historical homeland of the Sasanian dynasty. Of the 33 reliefs identified, 27 are located in Pars. The Sasanians deeply respected the old tomb sculptures built by the Achaemenid Empire (550–330 BC) in Pars, a region which roughly corresponded to the present-day Fars province. To build a visual and architectural tradition for their new empire, early Sasanian monarchs borrowed heavily from Achaemenid sculptural styles.

The Sasanian Empire produced a massive quantity of large outdoor rock reliefs prior to its collapse. Combined with the royal court's strict monopoly over the craft, these factors made rock relief carving a unique royal and Iranian tradition. Pars contained most Sasanian rock reliefs, particularly in areas surrounding Persepolis.

== List of Sasanian rock reliefs ==
Table of Sasanian rock reliefs
Image	Relief	Patron	Location	Size in m (l x h)	Subject matter	Site features
	Firuzabad 1	Ardashir I (r. 224–242)	Fars	19.80 x 4	equestrian triumph	Located within a river canyon close to the city
	Firuzabad 2	Ardashir I (r. 224–242)	Fars	4.90 x 3.90	divine investiture	Located within a river canyon close to the city
	Naqsh-e Rajab 3	Ardashir I (r. 224–242)	Fars	4.90 x 3.04	divine investiture	Beside a spring and close to the city
	Salmas	Ardashir I (r. 224–242)	Azerbaijan	10.0 x 3.50	investiture of governors	Set against the cliffside, close to the city by Lake Urmia
	Naqsh-e Rostam 1	Ardashir I (r. 224–242)	Fars	6.75 x 4.28	divine investiture and triumph	Set against a cliffside near Achaemenid burial sites and a tower, this area functioned as an important Sasanian cult site
	Naqsh-e Rajab 1	Shapur I (r. 240–270)	Fars	7 x 4.17	support of nobles	Beside a spring and close to the city
	Naqsh-e Rajab 4	Shapur I (r. 240–270)	Fars	6.40 x 2.9	divine investiture	Beside a spring and close to the city
	Naqsh-e Rostam 6	Shapur I (r. 240–270)	Fars	7 x 4.17	triumph	Set against a cliffside near Achaemenid burial sites and a tower, this area functioned as an important Sasanian cult site
	Bishapur 1	Shapur I (r. 240–270)	Fars	9.20 x ?	divine investiture and triumph	Located within a river canyon close to the city
	Bishapur 2	Shapur I (r. 240–270)	Fars	12.46 x 4.52	triumph and support of nobles	Located within a river canyon close to the city
	Bishapur 3	Shapur I (r. 240–270)	Fars	9.20 x 6.80	triumph and support of nobles	Located within a river canyon close to the city
	Rag-i-Bibi	Shapur I (r. 240–270)	Baghlan (Afghanistan)	6.50 x 5.90	hunting	Situated on a cliffside close to a major north-south travel route linking Bactria to India
	Bishapur 5	Bahram I (r. 271–274)	Fars	9.40 x 5.04 / 4.90	divine investiture and triumph	Located within a river canyon close to the city
	Naqsh-e Rostam 2	Bahram II (r. 274–293)	Fars	4.58 x 2.1–2.3	support of family and nobles	Set against a cliffside near Achaemenid burial sites and a tower, this area functioned as an important Sasanian cult site
	Sarab-e Bahram	Bahram II (r. 274–293)	Fars	4 x 2.60	support of family and nobles	Beside a spring
	Tang-e (or Sarab-e) Qandil	Bahram II (r. 274–293)	Fars	2.75 x 2.23	divine investiture (king receiving flower from the goddess Anahita)	Beside a river
	Barm-e Delak 1	Bahram II (r. 274–293)	Fars	2.1–2.6 x 1.80	courtly scene, king giving flower to queen	Beside a spring
	Barm-e Delak 2	Bahram II (r. 274–293)	Fars	left panel 1.25 x 2.75; right panel 1.25 x 2.08	king making gesture of reverence, courtier offering diadem	Beside a spring
	Guyom	Bahram II (r. 274–293)	Fars	1.6 x 2.60	king making gesture of reverence	Beside a spring
	Bishapur 4	Bahram II (r. 274–293)	Fars	7.45 x 3.40	triumph	Located within a river canyon close to the city
	Sar Mashhad	Bahram II (r. 274–293)	Fars	4.65 x 2.14	hunting	Set against the cliffside, close to the city
	Naqsh-e Rostam 3	Bahram II (r. 274–293)	Fars	9.35 x 3.52–3.90	equestrian triumph	Set against a cliffside near Achaemenid burial sites and a tower, this area functioned as an important Sasanian cult site
	Naqsh-e Rostam 7	Bahram II (r. 274–293)	Fars	upper panel: 6.85 x 5.80	equestrian triumph	Set against a cliffside near Achaemenid burial sites and a tower, this area functioned as an important Sasanian cult site
	Naqsh-e Rajab 2	Kartir	Fars	1.64 x .87	bust portrait with gesture of respect with inscription	Beside a spring and close to the city
	Naqsh-e Rostam 6	Kartir	Fars	6.40 x 1.9	bust portrait making gesture of respect with inscription	Set against a cliffside near Achaemenid burial sites and a tower, this area functioned as an important Sasanian cult site
	Naqsh-e Rostam 8	Narseh (r. 293–303)	Fars	5.65 x 3.50	divine investiture	Set against a cliffside near Achaemenid burial sites and a tower, this area functioned as an important Sasanian cult site
	Naqsh-e Rostam 4	Hormizd II (r. 303–309)	Fars	7.97 x 3.52	equestrian triumph	Set against a cliffside near Achaemenid burial sites and a tower, this area functioned as an important Sasanian cult site
	Naqsh-e Rostam 5	Shapur II (r. 309–379)	Fars	c.1 x 3.5	king enthroned	Set against a cliffside near Achaemenid burial sites and a tower, this area functioned as an important Sasanian cult site
	Bishapur 6	Shapur II (r. 309–379)	Fars	11 x 4.40–4.60	king enthroned, triumph	Located within a river canyon close to the city
	Taq-e Bostan 1	Ardashir II (r. 379–383)	Kermanshah	4.60 x 3.44	divine investiture and triumph	Located by a spring, a mountain, and a hunting ground
	Taq-e Bostan 2	Shapur III (r. 383–388)	Kermanshah	5.75 x 5.50, 3.80 deep	dynastic continuity	Located by a spring, a mountain, and a hunting ground
	Taq-e Bostan 3 (Great Ayvan)	Khosrow II (r. 591–628)	Kermanshah	vault: 7.5 x 8.90–9.2, 6.78 deep; left side panel 5.95 x 4.30, relief 5.74 x 3.85; right side panel 5.74 x 4.30, relief 5.74 x 3.85	divine investiture, bravery, hunting	Located by a spring, a mountain, and a hunting ground

Additional Sasanian reliefs, either unfinished and/or with uncertain patrons
Image	Site	Location	Description	Patron
	Cave of Shapur I	Fars	Prepared rock panels inside the cave remain unfinished, surrounding a colossal statue of Shapur I	Shapur I
	Sorsoreh	Ray	A now destroyed Sasanian rock relief	Shapur II (?)
	Naqsh-e Rostam	Fars	Unfinished rectangular surface above cistern	
	Naqsh-e Rostam	Fars	Small unfinished figure of a male figure with raised right hand to the left of Narseh's relief	
	Naqsh-e Rostam	Fars	Small unfinished figure of a lion to the left of Narseh's relief	
	Naqsh-e Rostam	Fars	Unfinished rectangular frame, deep relief, to right of Narseh's relief	Khosrow II (?)
	Naqsh-e Rostam	Fars	Unfinished rectangular panel between the cistern and Bahram II's Relief 2	
	Naqsh-e Rostam	Fars	Unfinished square panel to the lower left of Shapur I's relief	
	Darabgerd	Fars	Small panel of female figure	
	Terash-e Farhad	Kermanshah	Large unfinished rectangular panel, 20 x 30 m	Khosrow II (?)
	Boşat	Diyarbakır (Turkey)	Horseman and standing figure	

== See also ==
- List of Sasanian inscriptions

== Sources ==
- Canepa, Matthew P. (2013). "Sasanian rock reliefs". In Potts, Daniel T. (ed.). The Oxford Handbook of Ancient Iran. Brill. pp. 856–877. doi:10.1093/oxfordhb/9780199733309.001.0001. ISBN 978-0190668662.
