= Wuzurgan =

Third class-rank of the Sasanian aristocracy

Wuzurgān (Middle Persian: 𐭥𐭰𐭫𐭪𐭠𐭭, meaning "grandees" or the "great ones"), also known by its Modern Persian form of Bozorgān (بزرگان), was the name of the high nobility and the third class-rank of the four of the Sasanian aristocracy. After the fall of the Sasanian Empire, they reappear under the Dabuyid dynasty.

== Etymology ==
The word is the plural form of the word wuzurg 'big, great', which is derived from the Old Persian word vazarka, which is in turn hypothesized to derive from the Proto-Indo-European word *weǵ 'to be strong, lively, awake'.

== History ==
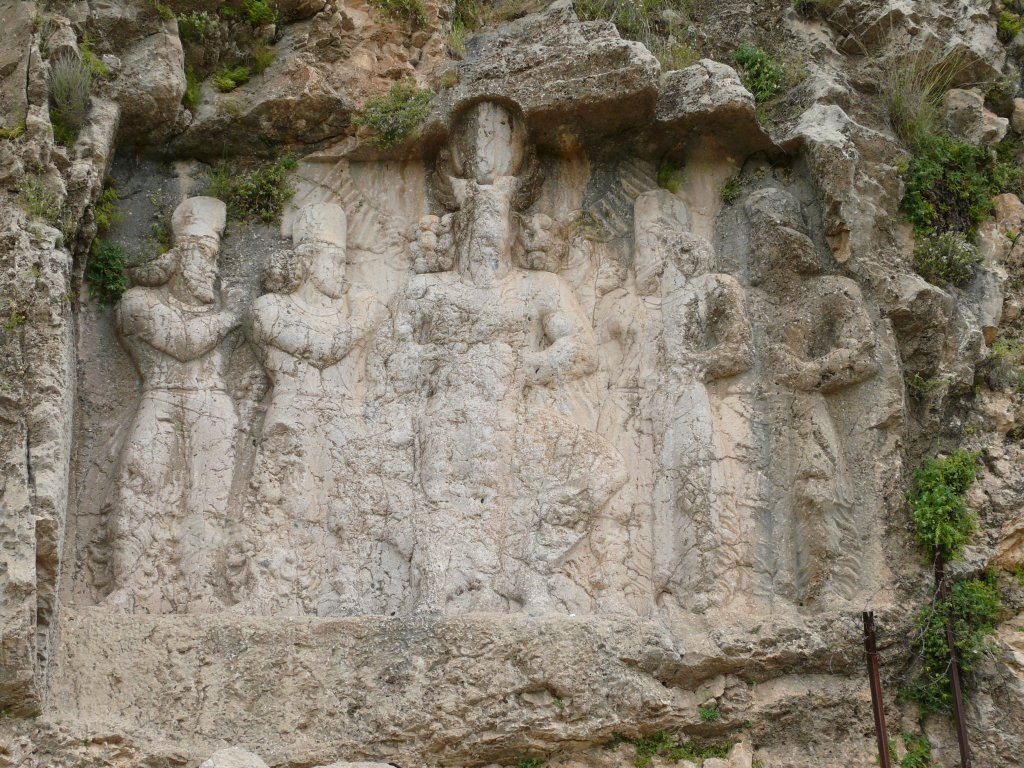
The Sarab-e Bahram relief of Bahram II surrounded by grandees, Kartir and Papak being on his left.

The wuzurgan are first mentioned in the early Sasanian period and appear in Shapur I's inscription in Hajjiabad. They played an important and prominent role in Sasanian politics, and seem to have held much influence. High-ranking members of the wuzurgan were present at the coronation of the Sasanian kings. Every time there was a dispute about choosing a Sasanian king, the objective of the wuzurgan was to elect a Sasanian king. After the death of Hormizd II in 309, the wuzurgan elected the latter's son Shapur II, who at that time was still in his mother's womb, as the king of the Sasanian Empire. Shapur's death in 379 marked the start of a 125-year conflict between the wuzurgan and the Sasanian kings, who both struggled for power over Iran.

During the reign of Yazdegerd I (r. 399–420), the wuzurgan were treated badly, and after the latter's death in 420, they expelled all his sons and elected his nephew Khosrow as the ruler of the Sasanian Empire. Nevertheless, they later made an agreement with Yazdegerd's son Bahram V, and recognized him as king of the Sasanian Empire. After Peroz I's disastrous campaign against the Hephthalites, which resulted in his death and the death of many of the wuzurgan, his brother Balash was elected by nobility as the king of the Sasanian Empire. However, in reality it was Sukhra, an Iranian nobleman from the House of Karen, who held power over the empire. Even the wuzurgan were under his control. Balash's reign eventually proved disastrous, and as a result he was replaced by Peroz's son Kavadh I.

Kavadh I, during his reign, began worshiping Mazdakism, a modified version of Zoroastrianism with influences from Manichaeism. The wuzurgan responded by siding with the Zoroastrian clergy, and had him imprisoned in 496, replacing him with his brother Djamasp. Gushnaspdad, the kanarang of the Sasanian Empire, later urged the wuzurgan and other noble classes to execute Kavadh I, which they, however, refused to do. The grandson of Kavadh I, Hormizd IV, because of his bad treatment of the wuzurgan and other high-class noble families, was in 590 deposed by a coup under the two Ispahbudhan brothers Vistahm and Vinduyih, who made Hormizd's son Khosrow II the new ruler of the Sasanian Empire. However, the wuzurgan and other nobles later became displeased with Khosrow II, and in 628 had him deposed in favor of his son Kavadh II.

After the death of Kavadh II, the wuzurgan elected the latter's son Ardashir III, who was only a mere child. During his reign, his minister Mah-Adhur Gushnasp, who was part of the wuzurgan class, in reality, controlled the Sasanian Empire. During the Arab conquest of Iran, a Sasanian general named Bahman Jadhuyih, who was the head of an army numbering 30,000 of the wuzurgan, defeated the Arabs at the Battle of the Bridge in 634. Nevertheless, the Arabs won several other victories against the Sasanian Empire, and by 651 had all of Iran under their control.

The wuzurgan are later mentioned during the reign of the Dabuyid ruler Khurshid (r. 740–760), where they along with the local population of Tabaristan were oppressed by Khurshid's general Karin. After the fall of the Dabuyid dynasty in 760, the wuzurgan are no longer mentioned in any sources.

== Sources ==
- Pourshariati, Parvaneh (2008). Decline and Fall of the Sasanian Empire: The Sasanian-Parthian Confederacy and the Arab Conquest of Iran. London and New York: I.B. Tauris. ISBN 978-1-84511-645-3.
- Tafazzoli, Ahmad (1989). "Bozorgān". In Yarshater, Ehsan (ed.). Encyclopædia Iranica. Vol. IV/4: Bolbol I–Brick (Online ed.). Encyclopædia Iranica Foundation. p. 427.
- Frye, Richard Nelson (1984). The History of Ancient Iran. C.H. Beck. ISBN 9783406093975.
