= Rag-i-Bibi =

Rock relief in Afghanistan

Coordinates: 35.8861°N 68.7483°E

- Location of Rag-i-Bibi in Afghanistan
- Artist: Unknown (possibly Sasanian)
- Year: Approx. 200–300 AD
- Type: Rock relief
- Subject: Sassanian king hunting an Indian rhinoceros
- Dimensions: 4.9 cm × 6.5 cm (1.9 in × 2.6 in)
- Condition: Largely destroyed due to weathering and Islamic iconoclasm
- Location: Afghanistan

Rag-i-Bibi (Veins of the Lady) refers to a Sasanian rock relief on a cliff in Bactria, modern-day Afghanistan. It first became known to western scholarship in 2002. It is located in the Baghlan Province, about a kilometre south of Shamarq and 10 km south of Puli Khumri. Rag-i-Bibi is the local name of the relief, which refers to Fatimah the daughter of Muhammad, who is venerated by the Shiites.

== History ==
The relief was likely carved around the 3rd Century AD. By 325 AD the Sasanian Empire had expanded from Persia to control much of modern-day Afghanistan including Bactria, leading to a dissemination of Sasanian art and culture.

Its geographic isolation among the mountains of Afghanistan meant the Rag-i-Bibi relief was not widely known until after the United States invasion of Afghanistan, which began in 2001. In 2002, a local journalist, Najibullah Razaq, who was concerned for its survival informed Jonathan Lee about the relief at an 'Afghanistan Day' held at the British Museum in December 2002. Lee visited the site for the first time in December 2003, and an archaeological survey was first conducted by Lee, Frantz Grenet and François Ory in May 2004. Specialist equipment was brought to the site and a 3D model created by Philippe Martinez.

The claim that the relief was Sasanian was made by Lee, Grenet and Ory. A 2020 paper claimed that this has been accepted too readily, and suggested that the relief was possibly carved during the Kushan Empire, which was present in the region before the Sasanians.

== Physical description ==
The relief is 4.9 m high and 6.5 m wide. It is carved into a natural sandstone cliff, facing east. It has been largely destroyed, partially by weathering and partially by Taliban iconoclasm.

The relief shows a Sasanian king hunting an Indian rhinoceros. The king reins in a galloping horse. His figure would be about 2.4 m high if it were standing upright. Three figures stand around the king. Behind the ruler's horse, another two can be made out, which are poorly preserved. The upper portion of the relief shows a band of poorly preserved architectural features.

The king's head is particularly severely damaged. The crown might enable an identification with a historical king; some stylistic details suggest that Shapur I is depicted. Stylistically, the relief contains Sasanian features, but also local Gandhara ones.

== See also ==
- History of Afghanistan

== Sources ==
- Grenet, Frantz; Lee, Jonathan; Martinez, Philippe; Ory, François (2007), "The Sasanian relief at Rag-i Bibi (Northern Afghanistan)", in Joe Cribb; Georgina Herrmann (eds.), After Alexander : Central Asia before Islam, Oxford: Published for the British Academy by Oxford University Press, pp. 243–267, ISBN 978-019-726384-6, OCLC 70173198 (Proceedings of the British Academy 133)
