= Kartir =

Zoroastrian high-priest of the late 3rd century

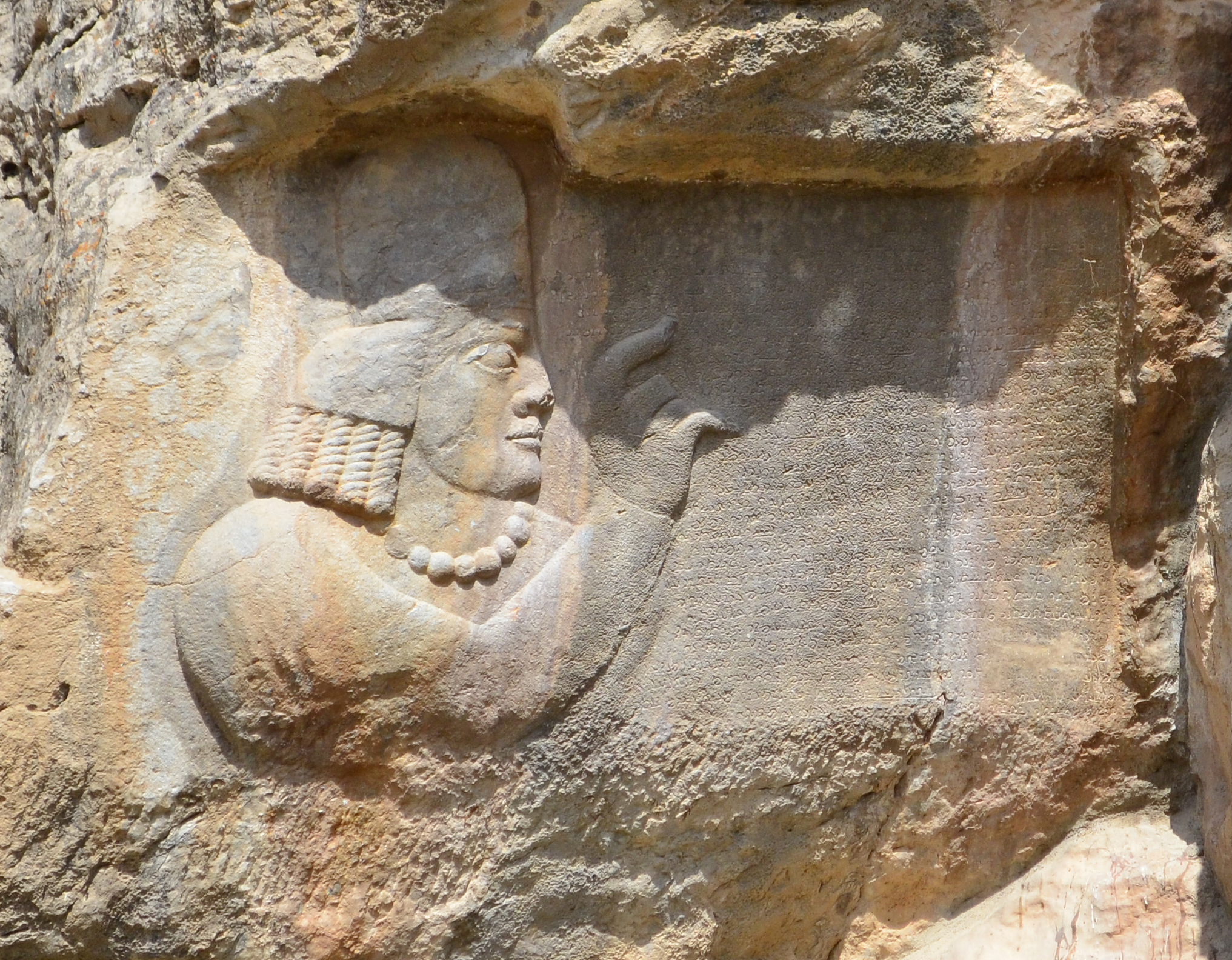
- Kartir's inscription at Naqsh-e Rajab
- Born: 3rd century Iran
- Died: 3rd century Iran

Kartir (also spelled Karder, Karter and Kerdir; Middle Persian: 𐭪𐭫𐭲𐭩𐭫 Kardīr) was a powerful and influential Zoroastrian priest during the reigns of four Sasanian kings in the 3rd century. His name is cited in the inscriptions of Shapur I (as well as in the Res Gestae Divi Saporis) and the Paikuli inscription of Narseh. Kartir also had inscriptions of his own made in the present-day Fars province (then known as Pars). His inscriptions narrates his rise to power throughout the reigns of Shapur I (r. 240–270), Hormizd I (r. 270–271), Bahram I (r. 271–274), and Bahram II (r. 274–293). During the brief reign of Bahram II's son and successor Bahram III, Kartir was amongst the nobles who supported the rebellion of Narseh, who overthrew Bahram III and ascended the throne. During Narseh's reign, Kartir faded into obscurity.

== Name ==
Kartir's name is spelled in several ways in the engravings: Middle Persian kltyl, kltyly, krtyr, kltyr (𐭪𐭫𐭲𐭩𐭫, 𐭪𐭫𐭲𐭩𐭫𐭩, 𐭪𐭥𐭲𐭩𐭥, 𐭪𐭫𐭲𐭩𐭥); Parthian krtyr (𐭊𐭓𐭕𐭉𐭓), Greek Karteir, and Coptic Kardel. The name was also used in the northeastern Iranian world, being spelt <krt'yr> in Sogdian and as Kirdira in Bactrian.

== Biography ==
=== Under Shapur I and Hormizd I ===
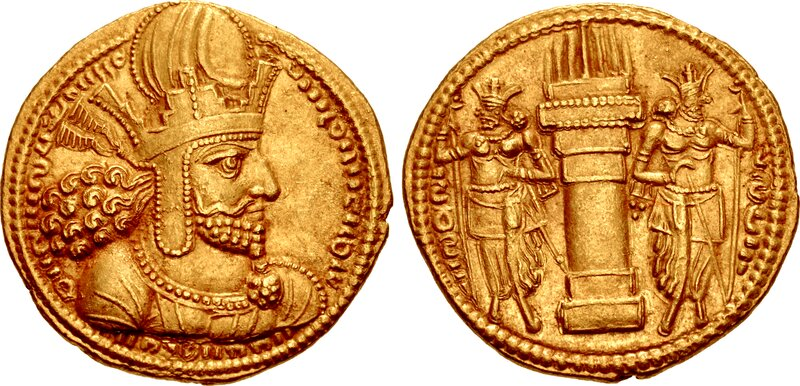
Coin of Shapur I.

Kartir may have been a eunuch: he was depicted without a beard in the Sasanian reliefs. He first appears in historical records in Shapur I's inscription at the Ka'ba-ye Zartosht, which was most likely created between 260 and 262. Kartir is the only religious bureaucrat mentioned in the inscription. Shapur I, a "lukewarm Zoroastrian", was known for his tolerance towards other religions. Although admiring the teachings of his own religion and encouraging the Zoroastrian clergy, Shapur I let the Jews, Christians, Buddhists, and Hindus freely practice their religion. He was also friendly towards the founder of Manichaeism, Mani, whom he allowed to preach freely and even escort his military expeditions.

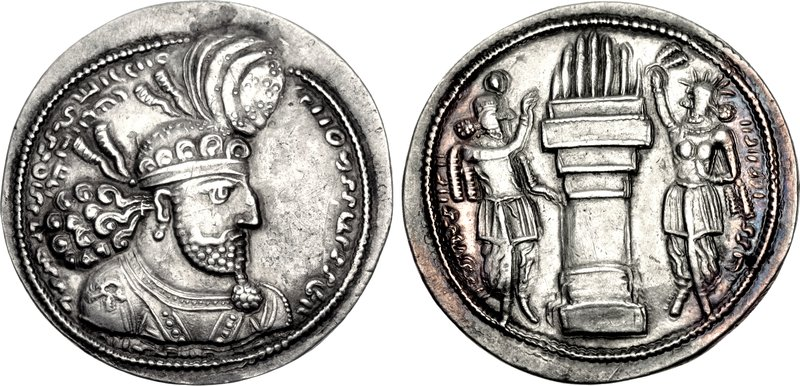
Coin of Hormizd I.

Shapur I's religious practices seem to have been somewhat unusual, with animal sacrifice being made for the souls of the kings and queens of the Sasanian family. This presumably seemed "pagan" to Zoroastrian priests. Kartir, who "abhorred animal sacrifice", was unable to stop Shapur I from doing them. Shapur I died in 270 and was succeeded by Hormizd I, who gave Kartir clothes that were worn by the upper class—the cap and belt (kulāf ud kamarband)—and appointed him as the chief priest (mowbed).

Hormizd I died the following year; Bahram I, who was never considered a candidate for succession of the throne by his father, ascended the throne with the aid of Kartir, whose authority and influence had greatly increased. Bahram I then made a settlement with his brother Narseh to give up his entitlement to the throne in return for the governorship of the important frontier province of Armenia, which was constantly the subject of war between the Roman and Sasanian Empires. Narseh held the title of Vazurg Šāh Arminān ("Great King of Armenia"), which was used by the heir to the throne. Nevertheless, Narseh still most likely viewed Bahram I as a usurper.

=== Under Bahram I ===
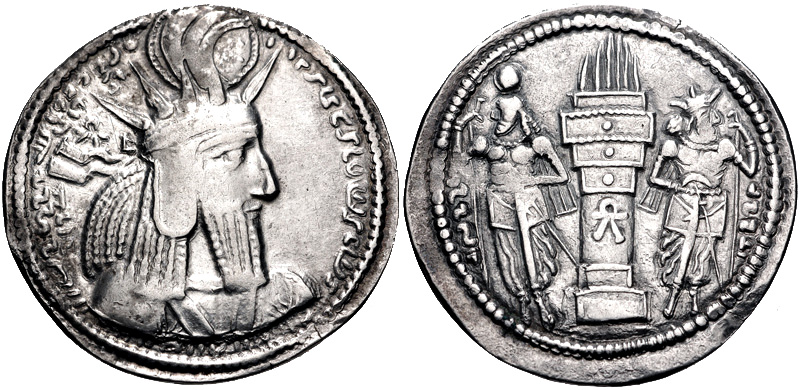
Coin of Bahram I.

The previous Sasanian emperors had pursued a policy of religious tolerance towards the non-Zoroastrian minorities in the empire. However, with Bahram I's accession to the throne, the rise of the authority of the Zoroastrian priesthood, and the increasing influence of Kartir, this changed; when Mani reached the city of Gundeshapur, much uproar occurred—supposedly in the same fashion as Jesus's entry into Jerusalem. Kartir, along with other Zoroastrian priests, protested and made Bahram I call for Mani's imprisonment and death in 274.

Mani's death was followed by the persecution of his followers by Kartir and the Zoroastrian clergy, who used the persecution of religious minorities as a method to increase and spread their vast influence. Mani was seen by the Zoroastrian clergy as a heretical philosopher and threatening pagan presenting an obscure perception of Zoroastrianism, which had been tainted by non-Zoroastrian (i.e., Jewish, Buddhist, and Christian) ideas. With the backing of Bahram I, Kartir laid the foundations for a Zoroastrian state church.

As a result, Bahram I was applauded in Sasanian-based sources as a "benevolent and worthy king." His son Bahram II succeeded him as emperor; he may have been aided by Kartir to ascend the throne instead of Narseh. This most likely frustrated Narseh, who had been neglected from succession several times.

=== Under Bahram II, Bahram III and Narseh ===
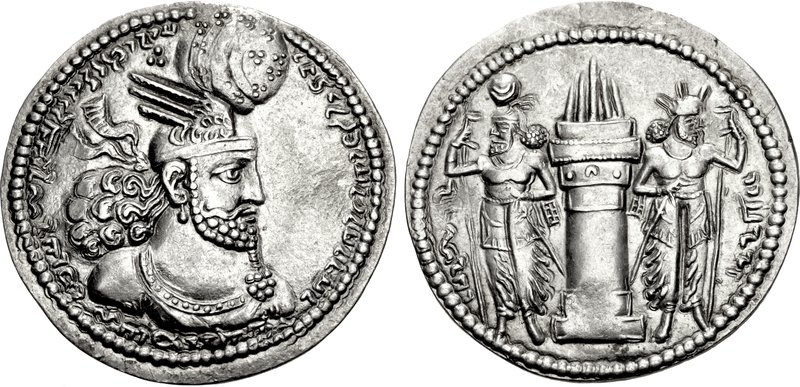
Coin of Bahram II.

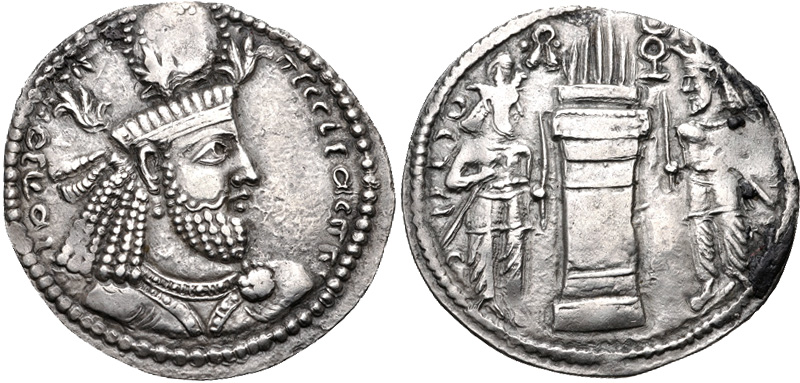
Coin of Narseh.

Bahram II, like his father, received Kartir well. He saw him as his mentor, and handed out several honors to Kartir, giving him the rank of wuzurg ("grandee") and appointing him as the dadwar ("supreme judge") of the empire; thenceforth, priests were given the office of judge. Kartir was also appointed the steward of the Temple of Anahita, Istakhr, which had originally been under the care of the Sasanian family. The Sasanians thus lost much of their religious authority in the empire. The clergy, from then on, served as judges all over the country, with court cases most likely decided based on Zoroastrian jurisprudence except when representatives of other religions had conflicts with each other.

Under Bahram II, Kartir unquestionably becomes a powerful figure in the empire; the latter claimed on his inscription at the Ka'ba-ye Zartosht that he "struck down" the non-Zoroastrian minorities, such as Christians, Jews, Mandaeans, Manichaeans, and Buddhists.

According to the modern historian Parvaneh Pourshariati: "[I]t is not clear, however, to what extent Kartir's declarations reflect the actual implementation, or for that matter, success, of the measures he is supposed to have promoted." Indeed, Jewish and Christian sources, for example, make no mention of persecutions during this period. Before Bahram II, all the previous Sasanian emperors had been "lukewarm Zoroastrians". He died in 293 and was succeeded by his son Bahram III.

Four months into Bahram III's reign, Narseh was summoned to Mesopotamia at the request of many members of the nobility. He met them in the passage of Paikuli in the province of Garmekan, where he was firmly approved and likely also declared shah for the first time. The reasons behind the nobles' favour of Narseh might have been due to his jurisdiction as governor, his image as an advocate of the Zoroastrian religion and as an insurer for harmony and prosperity of the empire. His ancestry from the early Sasanian family probably also played a role. Kartir was one of the nobles who supported Narseh, which is attested in the Paikuli inscription.

Narseh's reign marked the return to the policy of religious tolerance which had been practiced by his father. Some scholars suggest that Kartir was demoted by Narseh. In Narseh's inscription he is called simply "Kirdēr the Mowbed of Ohrmazd", as opposed to the more elaborate titles he held under Narseh's predecessors. Historian Touraj Daryaee suggests that Narseh may have taken back control of the temple of Anahita and focused his worship on her at the expense of Kartir's influence, although he does not rule out that the cult of Anahita never lapsed in the first place. According to Richard N. Frye, Kartir faded into obscurity because he did not do anything noteworthy as high priest.

== Legacy and assessment ==
According to the modern historian Prods Oktor Skjærvø, "In both Iranist and non-Iranist literature, there has been a tendency to elaboration and hyperbole. Several scholars have taken a strict and critical view of Kartir from their modern, and so irrelevant, vantage point." Zaehner called Kartir a "religious zealot of quite uncommon ardour" and to "the process of intolerance initiated and zestfully developed by Kartir". Russell called him "a ruthless fanatic, Kartir, [who] promoted the xenophobic state cult", while Folz refers to him as "fanatical". More positive views of Kartir are also found in modern sources, such as Hinz, who called him a "spiritual man yearning for a religious truth that ought to be revealed to all", while Neusner described "the [Sasanian] government’s enthusiasm for Kartir’s program".

== See also ==
- Kartir's inscription at Naqsh-e Rajab

== Sources ==
- Boyce, Mary (1957). "Some reflections on Zurvanism". Bulletin of the School of Oriental and African Studies. 19 (2). London: SOAS: 304–316. doi:10.1017/s0041977x00133063. S2CID 161924982.
- Boyce, Mary (1975). "On the Zoroastrian Temple Cult of Fire". Journal of the American Oriental Society. 95 (3). Ann Arbor: AOS/UMich. Press: 454–465. doi:10.2307/599356. JSTOR 599356.
- Boyce, Mary (1975). "Iconoclasm among Zoroastrians". Studies for Morton Smith at sixty. Leiden: Neusner. pp. 93–111.
- Daryaee, Touraj (2014). Sasanian Persia: The Rise and Fall of an Empire. I.B.Tauris. ISBN 978-0857716668.
- Daryaee, Touraj; Rezakhani, Khodadad (2017). "The Sasanian Empire". In Daryaee, Touraj (ed.). King of the Seven Climes: A History of the Ancient Iranian World (3000 BCE – 651 CE). UCI Jordan Center for Persian Studies. pp. 1–236. ISBN 9780692864401.
- Huyse, Philip (1998). "Kerdir and the first Sasanians". In Nicholas Sims-Williams (ed.). Proceedings of the Third European Conference of Iranian Studies. Vol. 1. Wiesbaden. pp. 109–120.
- Sprengling, Martin (1940). "Kartir. Founder of Sassanian Zoroastrianism". American Journal of Semitic Languages and Literatures. 57 (2): 197–228. doi:10.1086/370575. S2CID 171031902.
- Zaehner, Richard Charles (1972) [1955]. Zurvan, a Zoroastrian dilemma. Oxford: Biblo and Tannen. ISBN 0-8196-0280-9.
- Gignoux, Philippe (1991). Les quatre inscriptions du mage Kirdīr. Leuven: Peeters.
- Al-Tabari, Abu Ja'far Muhammad ibn Jarir (1985–2007). Ehsan Yar-Shater (ed.). The History of Al-Ṭabarī. Vol. 40 vols. Albany, NY: State University of New York Press.
- Daniel, Elton L. (2012). The History of Iran. ABC-CLIO.
- Frye, R. N. (1983), "Chapter 4", The political history of Iran under the Sasanians, The Cambridge History of Iran, vol. 3, Cambridge University Press, ISBN 978-0-521-20092-9
- Kia, Mehrdad (2016). The Persian Empire: A Historical Encyclopedia [2 volumes]: A Historical Encyclopedia. ABC-CLIO. ISBN 978-1610693912.
- Malandra, William (2018). "Kerdir". In Nicholson, Oliver (ed.). The Oxford Dictionary of Late Antiquity. Oxford: Oxford University Press. ISBN 978-0-19-866277-8.
- Payne, Richard E. (2015). A State of Mixture: Christians, Zoroastrians, and Iranian Political Culture in Late Antiquity. Univ of California Press. pp. 1–320. ISBN 9780520961531.
- Pourshariati, Parvaneh (2008). Decline and Fall of the Sasanian Empire: The Sasanian-Parthian Confederacy and the Arab Conquest of Iran. London and New York: I.B. Tauris. ISBN 978-1-84511-645-3.
- Shahbazi, A. Shapur (2004). "Hormozd Kusansah". Encyclopaedia Iranica.
- Shahbazi, A. Shapur (2005). "SASANIAN DYNASTY". Encyclopaedia Iranica, Online Edition.
- Shahbazi, A. Shapur (1988). "Bahrām I". Encyclopaedia Iranica. Vol. III, Fasc. 5. pp. 514–522.
- Skjærvø, Prods Oktor (2011). "Kartir". Encyclopaedia Iranica, Vol. XV, Fasc. 6. pp. 608–628.
- Weber, Ursula (2016). "Narseh". Archived copy. Encyclopaedia Iranica. Archived from the original on 2019-05-29.
