= Hormizd I =

King of Armenia from 252 to 270, Shahanshah of the Sasanian Empire from 270 to 271

Hormizd I 𐭠𐭥𐭧𐭥𐭬𐭦𐭣
- King of Kings of Iranians and non-Iranians
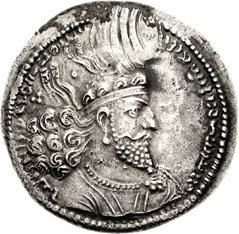
- Drachma of Hormizd I

King of Armenia
- Reign: c. 252 – 270
- Predecessor: Tiridates II (Arsacid dynasty)
- Successor: Narseh

Shahanshah of the Sasanian Empire
- Reign: May 270 – June 271
- Predecessor: Shapur I
- Successor: Bahram I
- Died: June 271
- Issue: Hormozdak
- House: House of Sasan
- Father: Shapur I
- Mother: Kurdzad daughter of Mihrak
- Religion: Zoroastrianism

Hormizd-Ardashir, better known by his dynastic name of Hormizd I (also spelled Hormozd I or Ohrmazd I; Middle Persian: 𐭠𐭥𐭧𐭥𐭬𐭦𐭣), was the third Sasanian King of Kings (shahanshah) of Iran, who ruled from May 270 to June 271. He was the third-born son of Shapur I (r. 240–270), under whom he was governor-king of Armenia, and also took part in his father's wars against the Roman Empire. Hormizd I's brief time as ruler of Iran was largely uneventful. He built the city of Hormizd-Ardashir (present-day Ahvaz), which remains a major city today in Iran. He promoted the Zoroastrian priest Kartir to the rank of chief priest (mowbed) and gave the Manichaean prophet Mani permission to continue his preaching.

It was under Hormizd I that the title of "King of Kings of Iran and non-Iran" became regularized in Sasanian coinage; previously, the royal titulary had generally been "King of Kings of Iran". Hormizd I was succeeded by his eldest brother Bahram I.

== Etymology ==
The name of Hormizd (also spelled Ōhrmazd, Hormozd) is the Middle Persian version of the name of the supreme deity in Zoroastrianism, known in Avestan as Ahura Mazda. The Old Persian equivalent is Auramazdā, whilst the Greek transliteration is Hormisdas. The name is attested in Armenian as Ormizd and in Georgian as Urmizd. His personal name was "Hormizd-Ardashir", a combination of "Hormizd" and "Ardashir", the latter being the Middle Persian form of the Old Persian Ṛtaxšira (also spelled Artaxšaçā), meaning "whose reign is through truth (asha)".

== Background ==
Hormizd was the third-born son of Shapur I (r. 240–270). According to folklore, Hormizd's mother was a daughter of the Parthian dynast Mihrak. His two elder brothers were Bahram (the eldest) and Shapur Meshanshah, whilst Narseh was his younger brother. Hormizd had two sisters named Adur-Anahid and Shapurdukhtak. His grandfather was Ardashir I, the founder of the Sasanian Empire. The Sasanians had supplanted the Arsacid Empire as the sovereigns of Iran in 224, when Ardashir I defeated and killed the last Arsacid King of Kings Artabanus IV (r. 213–224) at the Battle of Hormozdgan.

== Rise ==
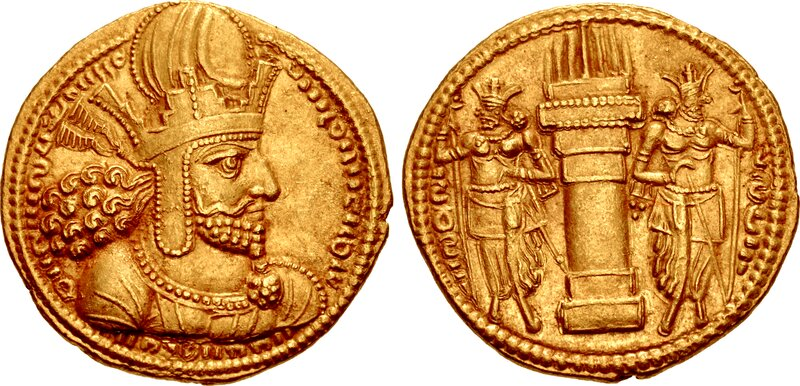
Gold dinar of Shapur I

Hormizd is first mentioned during the wars of Shapur I against the Roman Empire. He was made the king of Armenia after its conquest by Shapur I in 252. Hormizd is believed to be many modern historians to have taken part in Shapur I's second Roman expedition, which took place in the Roman provinces of Syria, Cilicia, and Cappadocia, and which lasted from 253 to 256. This is supported by the reports of the Cappadocian conquests. Cappadocia does not appear to have been the only area that Hormizd fought in: according to the Scriptores Historiae Augustae, the Roman rebel Cyriades assisted Shapur I and a certain Odomastes in the conquest of Antioch. The name Odomastes is an incorrect transliteration of Hormizd, and may thus suggest that after plundering Cappadocia, Hormizd took part in the siege of Antioch in 253.

Hormizd is mentioned in an inscription on the wall of the Ka'ba-ye Zartosht at Naqsh-e Rostam near Persepolis in southern Iran, which Shapur I had created in order to praise his sons by citing their names and titles. In the inscription, Hormizd is given the title of Wuzurg Šāh Arminān ("Great King of the Armenians"). The 4th-century Armenian historian Agathangelos states that this title was only given to the heir of the shahanshah.

When Shapur I was on his deathbed, he crowned Hormizd as the new shahanshah of Iran, in May 270. According to one view, upon his accession Hormizd left the crown of Armenia to his brother Narseh, but another view holds that Narseh only received Armenia from Bahram I after Hormizd's death, in exchange for Narseh renouncing his claim to the Sasanian throne.

== Reign ==
Little is known of Hormizd's reign. He reportedly gave the Zoroastrian priest Kartir clothes that were worn by the upper class, the cap and belt (kulāf ud kamarband) and appointed him as the chief priest (mowbed). Like his father, Hormizd also granted the Manichaean prophet Mani permission to continue his preaching. It is unclear why Hormizd supported Kartir and Mani, both of whom represented a different religion. The Iranologist Touraj Daryaee has suggested that it was possibly part of his attempt to control both religions, which were both seeking to become the main religion in the empire. According to the Iranologist Prods Oktor Skjaervo, Hormizd was like his two predecessors, a "lukewarm Zoroastrian". Hormizd is usually given the epithet of nēw or yaxī/yaxē (both meaning "brave") in Manichean Middle Iranian sources, possibly indicating his accomplishments in warfare. It was seemingly under Hormizd that the two New Year festivals (Nowruz) in the month of Farwardin were linked together to design a festival that lasted six days. In primary sources, Hormizd is credited as the founder of the city of Hormizd-Ardashir (present-day Ahvaz), however, in some instances Ardashir I is also attributed as its founder. Modern historians (citing Šahrestānīhā ī Ērānšahr) usually consider Hormizd to be its actual founder. He also founded the city of Ram-Hormizd-Ardashir (meaning "Ardashir's peace of Hormizd"), abbreviated as Ram-Hormizd. He refounded the city of Artemita as Dastagird, whose royal residence would later serve as an important place for the shahanshahs Khosrow I (r. 531–579) and Khosrow II (r. 590–628). Hormizd was not succeeded by his son Hormozdak, but by his brother Bahram (who became known as Bahram I), who ascended the throne with the aid of Kartir. According to local folklore, Hormizd was buried in Ram-Hormizd.

== Coinage and imperial ideology ==
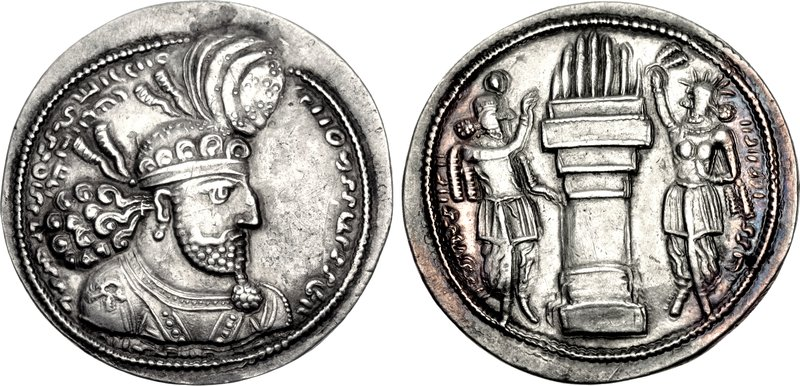
Drachma of Hormizd I

While Ardashir I and Shapur I generally used the title of "King of Kings of (Iran)ians" on their coinage, Hormizd had the title slightly modified, adding the phrase "and non-Iran(ians)". His full title thus read "the Mazda-worshiping, divine Hormizd, King of Kings of Iran(ians) and non-Iran(ians), whose image/brilliance is from the gods". (Note: In Middle Persian: Mazdēsn bay Ōhrmazd šāhān šāh Ērān ud Anērān kēčihr az yazdān.) The phrase "and non-Iran(ians)" had already been in use in the inscriptions of Shapur I, and in rare cases his coin mints, but was first regularized under Hormizd. The extended title demonstrates the incorporation of new territory into the empire, however what was precisely seen as "non-Iran(ian)" (aneran) is not certain. The reverse of Hormizd's coin portrayed two attendants, an addition that was first made by Shapur I, on whose coinage both attendants are depicted wearing mural crowns, whilst looking away from the fire temple between them. They most likely represented the shah. In the coinage of Hormizd, the attendants face the temple and are wearing different crowns. The figure on the left side represents Hormizd, whilst the figure on the right—depending on its portrayal—represents the Iranian deities Mithra or Anahita.

== Sources ==
- Al-Tabari, Abu Ja'far Muhammad ibn Jarir (1985–2007). Ehsan Yar-Shater (ed.). The History of Al-Ṭabarī. Vol. 40 vols. Albany, NY: State University of New York Press.
- Badiyi, Bahram (2020). "Cities and Mint Centers Founded by the Sasanians". Ancient Iranian Numismatics. pp. 203–233. doi:10.1163/9789004460720_012. ISBN 978-90-04-46072-0. S2CID 242624054.
- Brosius, Maria (2000). "Women i. In Pre-Islamic Persia". Encyclopaedia Iranica. London et al.
- Brunner, Christopher (1983). "Geographical and Administrative divisions: Settlements and Economy". In Yarshater, Ehsan (ed.). The Cambridge History of Iran: The Seleucid, Parthian and Sasanian Periods. Vol. 3(2). Cambridge: Cambridge University Press. pp. 747–778. ISBN 0-521-24693-8.
- Curtis, Vesta Sarkhosh; Stewart, Sarah (2008). The Sasanian Era. I.B.Tauris. pp. 1–200. ISBN 978-0-85771-972-0.
- Daryaee, Touraj (2014). Sasanian Persia: The Rise and Fall of an Empire. I.B.Tauris. pp. 1–240. ISBN 978-0-85771-666-8.
- Gignoux, Ph. (1983). "Ādur-Anāhīd". Encyclopaedia Iranica, Vol. I, Fasc. 5. London et al. p. 472.
- Jalalipour, Saeid (2015). "The Arab Conquest of Persia: The Khūzistān Province before and after the Muslims Triumph" (PDF). Sasanika.
- Kia, Mehrdad (2016). The Persian Empire: A Historical Encyclopedia. ABC-CLIO. ISBN 978-1-61069-391-2. (2 volumes)
- Pourshariati, Parvaneh (2008). Decline and Fall of the Sasanian Empire: The Sasanian-Parthian Confederacy and the Arab Conquest of Iran. London and New York: I.B. Tauris. ISBN 978-1-84511-645-3.
- Rapp, Stephen H. Jr (2014). The Sasanian World through Georgian Eyes: Caucasia and the Iranian Commonwealth in Late Antique Georgian Literature. Routledge. ISBN 978-1-4724-2552-2.
- Schindel, Nikolaus (2013). "Sasanian Coinage". In Potts, Daniel T. (ed.). The Oxford Handbook of Ancient Iran. Oxford University Press. ISBN 978-0-19-973330-9.
- Schmitt, R.; Bailey, H. W. (1986). "ARMENIA AND IRAN iv. Iranian influences in Armenian Language". Encyclopaedia Iranica, Vol. II, Fasc. 4-5. pp. 445–465.
- Schmitt, R. (1986). "Artaxerxes". Encyclopaedia Iranica, Vol. II, Fasc. 6. pp. 654–655.
- Shahbazi, A. Shapur (1988). "Bahrām I". Encyclopaedia Iranica, Vol. III, Fasc. 5. pp. 514–522.
- Shahbazi, A. Shapur (2005). "Sasanian dynasty". Encyclopaedia Iranica, Online Edition.
- Shayegan, M. Rahim (2004). "Hormozd I". Encyclopaedia Iranica, Vol. XII, Fasc. 5. pp. 462–464.
- Shayegan, M. Rahim (2013). "Sasanian Political Ideology". In Potts, Daniel T. (ed.). The Oxford Handbook of Ancient Iran. Oxford University Press. ISBN 978-0-19-973330-9.
- Skjærvø, Prods Oktor (2012). "Kartīr". Encyclopædia Iranica.
- Stausberg, Michael; Vevaina, Yuhan Sohrab-Dinshaw; Tessmann, Anna (2015). The Wiley Blackwell Companion to Zoroastrianism. John Wiley & Sons, Ltd.
- Toumanoff, Cyril (1969). "The Third-Century Armenian Arsacids: A Chronological and Genealogical Commentary". Revue des études arméniennes. 6: 233–281.
- Vevaina, Yuhan; Canepa, Matthew (2018). "Ohrmazd". In Nicholson, Oliver (ed.). The Oxford Dictionary of Late Antiquity. Oxford: Oxford University Press. ISBN 978-0-19-866277-8.
- Weber, Ursula (2016). "Narseh". Encyclopaedia Iranica.
- Wiesehöfer, Joseph (1986). "Ardašīr I i. History". Encyclopaedia Iranica, Vol. II, Fasc. 4. pp. 371–376.

Hormizd I Sasanian dynasty Died: June 271
Preceded by Shapur I	King of Kings of Iran and non-Iran; 270–271	Succeeded by Bahram I
