= Barm-e Delak =

Site of a Sasanian rock relief in Iran

- برم‌دلک (Persian)
- Barm-e Dilak
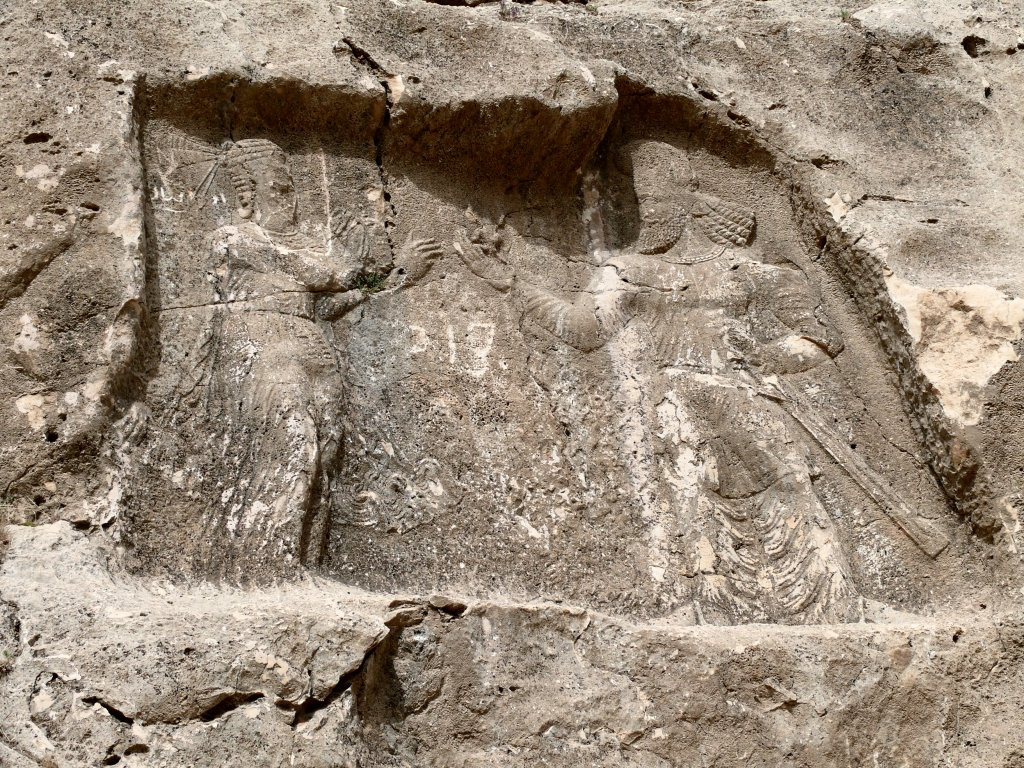
- Sasanian king Bahram II offering a lotus flower to his wife

- Location within Iran
- 29°35′07″N 52°39′14″E
- Type: rock relief
- Periods: Sasanian
- Cultures: Iran
- Location: Pars, Iran

Site notes
- Area: 2 ha (4.9 acres)
- Owner: Mixed public and private
- Public access: Partial

Iran National Heritage List
- Official name: Barm-e Delak Rock Relief
- Type: Rock Relief
- Designated: 1932
- Reference no.: 71
- Conservation organization: Cultural Heritage, Handicrafts and Tourism Organization of Iran

Barm-e Delak (Persian: برم‌دلک), is a site of a Sasanian rock relief located about 10 km southeast of Shiraz, in the Fars province of Iran. The rock relief was known as Bahram-e Dundalk in Middle Persian, which means Bahram's heart.

== History ==
The site is located near a river, on the eastern side of a rocky spur. It features four reliefs.

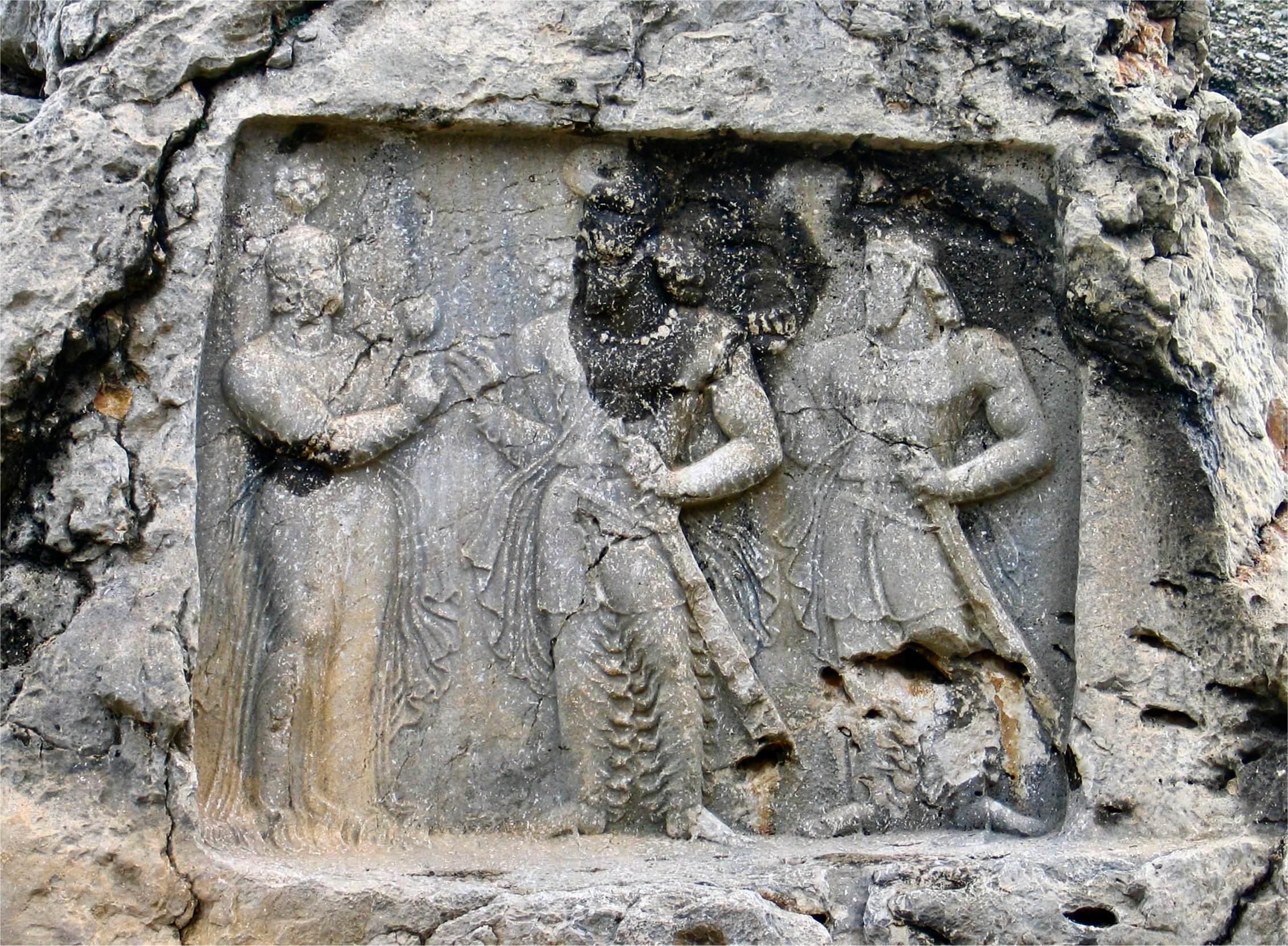
Rock relief of Sasanian king Bahram II at Sarab-e Qandil (AKA Tang-e Qandil), vicinity of Bishapur, near modern Kazerun

The first relief is a family scene done in a unique style in honour of king Bahram II. It shows the king offering a lotus flower to his wife, Shapurdukhtak.

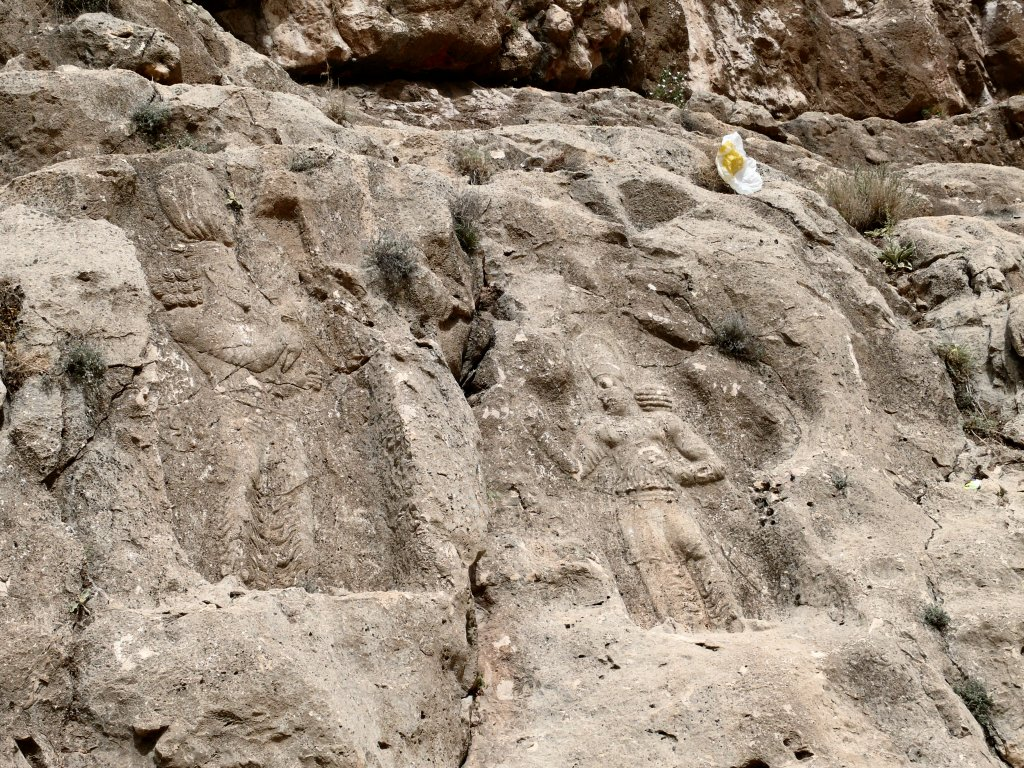
Rock relief Barm-e Dilak II

== See also ==
- Bahram II
- Bishapour
