= Bahram I =

Shahanshah of the Sasanian Empire from 271 to 274

Bahram I 𐭥𐭫𐭧𐭫𐭠𐭭
- King of Kings of Iranians and non-Iranians
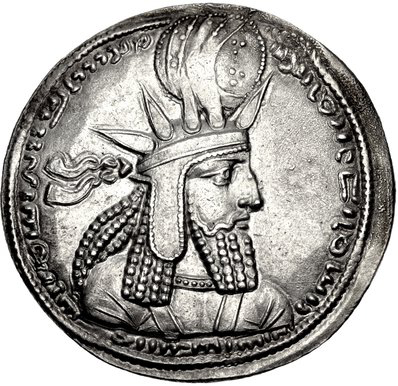
- Drachma of Bahram I

Shahanshah of the Sasanian Empire
- Reign: June 271 – September 274
- Predecessor: Hormizd I
- Successor: Bahram II
- Died: September 274
- Issue: Bahram II; Hormizd I Kushanshah
- House: House of Sasan
- Father: Shapur I
- Religion: Zoroastrianism

Bahram I (also spelled Wahram I or Warahran I; Middle Persian: 𐭥𐭫𐭧𐭫𐭠𐭭) was the fourth Sasanian King of Kings of Iran from 271 to 274. He was the eldest son of Shapur I (r. 240–270) and succeeded his brother Hormizd I (r. 270–271), who had reigned for a year.

Bahram I's reign marked the end of Sasanian tolerance towards Manichaeism, and in 274, at the urging of the influential Zoroastrian priest Kartir, he had Mani imprisoned and executed. Bahram I's reign was brief and largely uneventful. He was succeeded by his son Bahram II.

== Name ==
The theophoric name "Bahram" (بهرام یکم) is the New Persian form of the Middle Persian Warahrān (also spelled Wahrām), which is derived from the Old Iranian Vṛθragna. The Avestan equivalent was Verethragna, the name of the old Iranian god of victory, whilst the Parthian version was *Warθagn. The name is transliterated in Greek as Baranes, whilst the Armenian transliteration is Vahagn/Vrām. The name is attested in Georgian as Baram and Latin as Vararanes.

== Life prior to his accession ==
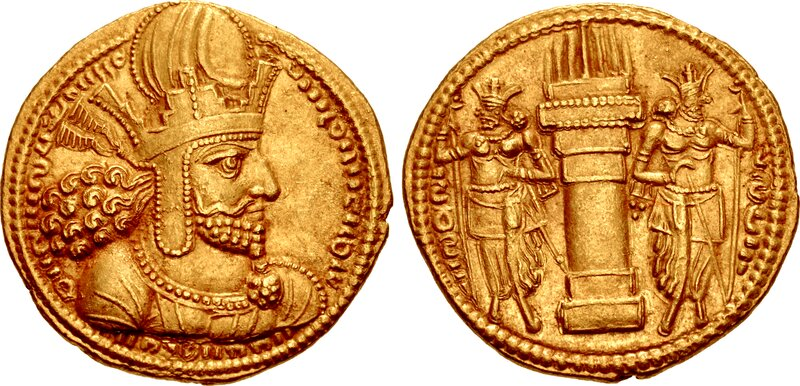
Gold dinar of Shapur I

Bahram I was the oldest son of Shapur I, the second shah of the Sasanian Empire. He had three younger brothers: Hormizd-Ardashir, Narseh, and Shapur Meshanshah. Although the oldest of Shapur's sons, Bahram I was ranked below his brothers, probably due to his mother's lowly origin: she was either a minor queen or a concubine. During Shapur's reign, Bahram I served as the governor of the newly conquered region of Gilan, situated on the southwest shore of the Caspian Sea. He held the title of Gelan Shah ("king of Gilan"). He is mentioned in an inscription on the wall of the Ka'ba-ye Zartosht at Naqsh-e Rostam near Persepolis in southern Iran, which Shapur I had created in order to praise his sons by citing their names and titles.

Shapur I died in 270, and was succeeded by Hormizd-Ardashir (who became known as Hormizd I), who ruled from May 270 until his death in June 271. Bahram I subsequently became the new shah, likely with aid of the powerful Zoroastrian priest Kartir. He then made a settlement with Narseh, who agreed to give up his entitlement to the throne in return for the governorship of the important frontier province of Armenia, which was constantly the source of war between the Roman and Sasanian Empires. Bahram was likely considered a usurper by Narseh.

== Reign ==
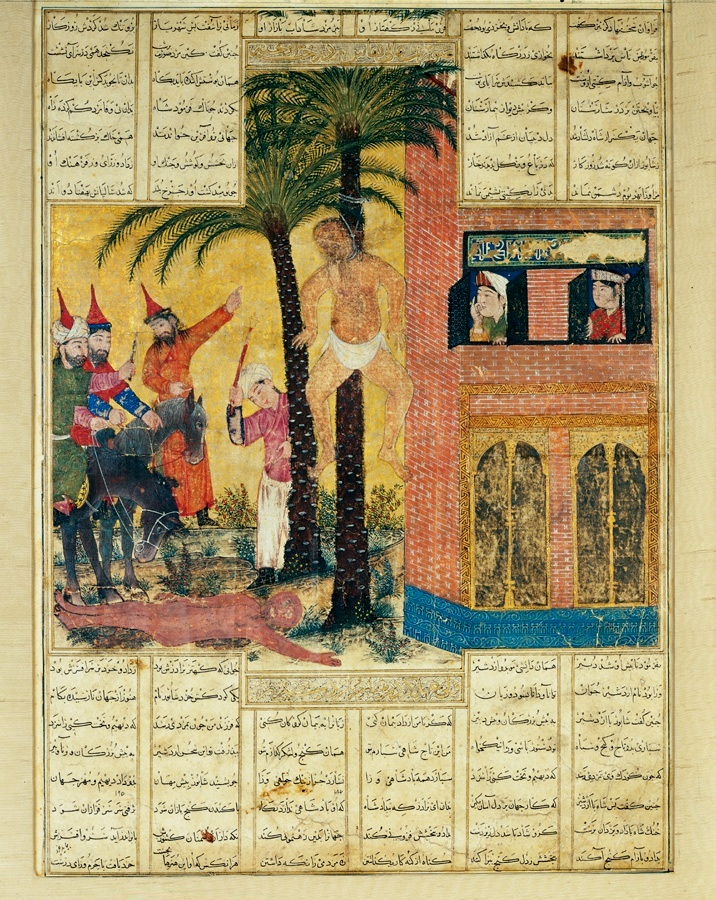
A 14th-century illustration of the execution of Mani

The previous Sasanian shahs, including Shapur I, had pursued a policy of religious tolerance towards the non-Zoroastrian minorities in the empire. Although admiring the teachings of his own religion and encouraging the Zoroastrian clergy, Shapur I allowed the Jews, Christians, Buddhists, and Hindus to freely practice their own religions. He was also friendly towards Mani, the founder of Manichaeism, who was allowed to preach freely and even act as an escort in Shapur's military expeditions. Following Bahram I's accession to the throne, the rise of the authority of the Zoroastrian priesthood, and the increasing influence of Kartir, this changed. When Mani arrived at the city of Gundishapur there was uproar, similar to that of Jesus' entry into Jerusalem. After protests from Kartir and the other Zoroastrian priests, Bahram I was persuaded to imprison Mani, who was sentenced to death in 274.

Mani's death was followed by the persecution of his followers by Kartir and the Zoroastrian clergy, who moved against the kingdom's religious minorities as a way to increase and spread their influence. To the Zoroastrian clergy, Mani had been seen as a heterogeneous philosopher and a threatening pagan, who presented an obscure perception of Zoroastrianism that was tainted by Jewish, Buddhist, and Christian ideas. With the backing of Bahram I, Kartir laid the foundations for a Zoroastrian state church, which led to Bahram being applauded in Sasanian-based sources as a "benevolent and worthy king". Bahram I was nevertheless, like his predecessors, a "lukewarm Zoroastrian".

Bahram I died in September 274 and was succeeded by his son Bahram II. Another son of Bahram I, Hormizd I Kushanshah, ruled over the Kushano-Sasanian kingdom in the east, and would later lead a rebellion against Bahram II, which failed. The line of Bahram I continued to rule the Sasanian Empire until 293, when Narseh overthrew the latter's grandson Bahram III and proclaimed himself the new shah. The line was thus shifted to Narseh and his descendants, who continued to rule the empire until its fall in 651.

== Coinage, appearance and habits ==
Under Bahram I, the reverse of coins were changed back to the version minted during the reign of Shapur I, with two attendants turning their backs to the fire altar, instead of facing it. The obverse of Bahram I's coins shows him wearing a crown with ray-shaped spikes, a hallmark of the angelic divinity Mithra. A coin of Bahram was seemingly minted at Balkh in Bactria, which makes it the first imperial Sasanian coin (i.e. not Kushano-Sasanian) minted in the former domains of the Kushan Empire, and confirms direct Sasanian rule in the region under Bahram I. The lost Book of the Portraits of Sasanian Kings portrayed Bahram I as "standing, holding a lance in the right hand and leaning upon a sword held in the left, and wearing a red gown and trousers and a gold crown topped with a sky-blue globe".

Bahram I was keen on combat, hunting and feasting, which he regarded as righteousness.

== Rock relief ==
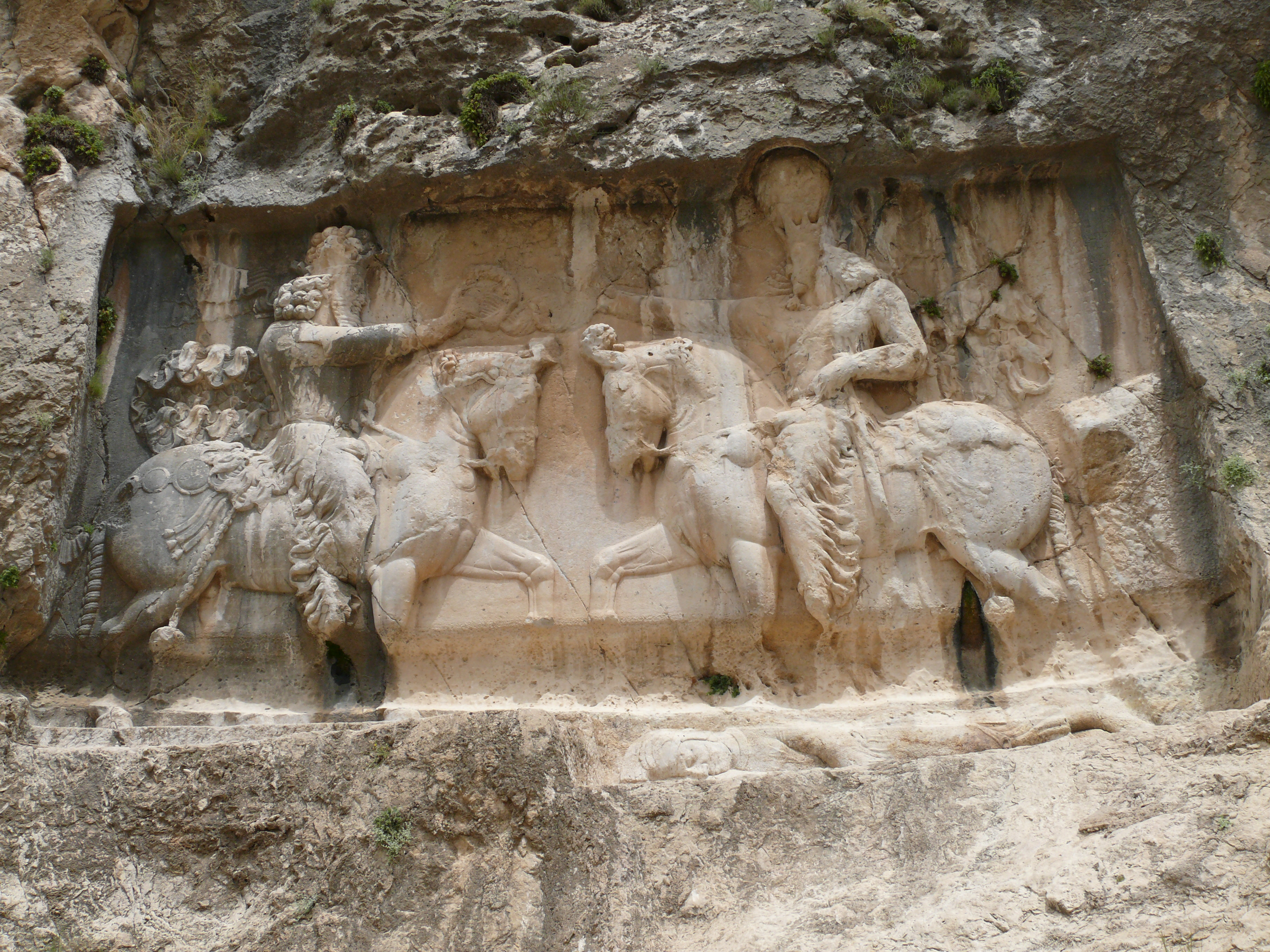
The rock relief of Bahram I receiving the royal diadem from the Zoroastrian supreme god Ahura Mazda, at the ancient city of Bishapur.

Following the precedent of Ardashir I and Shapur I, Bahram I had an image of his accession carved in a rock relief. It displayed him on horseback, accepting the diadem of kingship from the Zoroastrian supreme god Ahura Mazda, who is also depicted sitting on a horse. A Middle Persian inscription is written on the relief. According to the archaeologist Erich Schmidt, the relief is "artistically the most appealing example of Sasanian rock sculpture". When Narseh ascended the throne in 293, he had the rock relief altered, replacing Bahram's name with his own.

== Sources ==
- Curtis, Vesta Sarkhosh; Stewart, Sarah (2008). The Sasanian Era. I.B. Tauris. ISBN 978-1845116903.
- Daryaee, Touraj (2009). Sasanian Persia: The Rise and Fall of an Empire. I.B.Tauris & Co. Ltd. ISBN 978-1-85043-898-4.
- Frye, Richard Nelson (1983). "The political history of Iran under the Sasanians". In Yarshater, Ehsan (ed.). The Cambridge History of Iran: The Seleucid, Parthian and Sasanian Periods. Vol. 3(1). Cambridge: Cambridge University Press. ISBN 0-521-20092-X.
- Kia, Mehrdad (2016). The Persian Empire: A Historical Encyclopedia. ABC-CLIO. ISBN 978-1610693912. (2 volumes)
- Martindale, J. R.; Jones, A. H. M.; Morris, J. (1971). The Prosopography of the Later Roman Empire: Volume 1, AD 260-395. Cambridge University Press. ISBN 9780521072335.
- Multiple authors (1988). "Bahrām". Encyclopaedia Iranica, Vol. III, Fasc. 5. pp. 514–522.
- Rapp, Stephen H. (2014). The Sasanian World through Georgian Eyes: Caucasia and the Iranian Commonwealth in Late Antique Georgian Literature. Ashgate Publishing, Ltd. ISBN 978-1472425522.
- Shahbazi, A. Shapur (1988). "Bahrām I". Encyclopaedia Iranica, Vol. III, Fasc. 5. pp. 514–522.
- Shahbazi, A. Shapur (2004). "Hormozd Kušānšāh". Encyclopædia Iranica.
- Shahbazi, A. Shapur (2005). "Sasanian Dynasty". Encyclopædia Iranica.
- Skjærvø, Prods Oktor (2011). "Kartir". Encyclopaedia Iranica, Vol. XV, Fasc. 6. pp. 608–628.
- Weber, Ursula (2016). "Narseh". Encyclopædia Iranica.
- Wiesehöfer, Josef (2018). "Bahram I". In Nicholson, Oliver (ed.). The Oxford Dictionary of Late Antiquity. Oxford: Oxford University Press. ISBN 978-0-19-866277-8. (subscription required)

Bahram I Sasanian dynasty Died: September 274
Preceded by Hormizd I	King of Kings of Iran and non-Iran; 271–274	Succeeded by Bahram II
