= Dadwar =

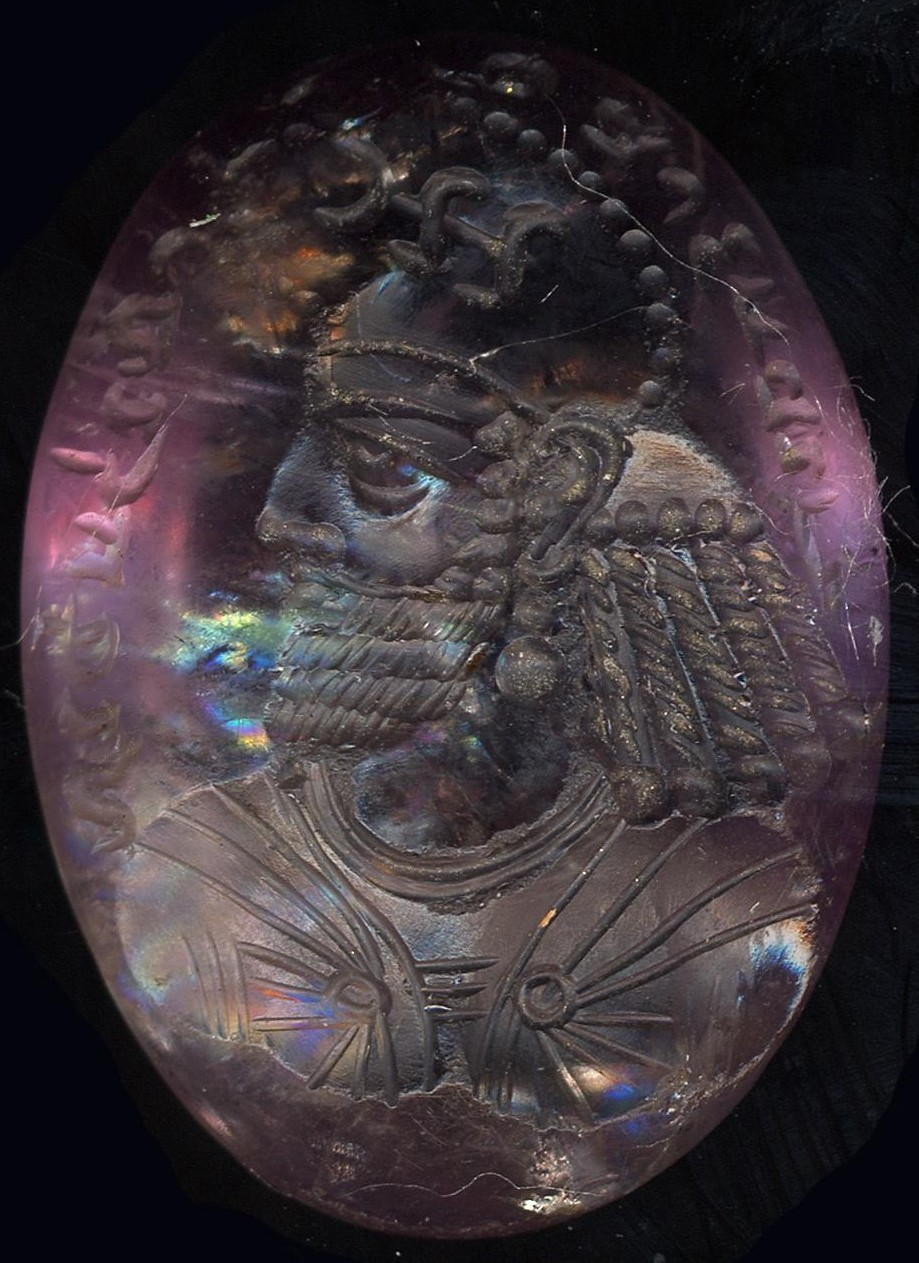
Amethyst stamp seal depicting a bearded male bust, with a Middle Persian inscription reading "Himawz the high judge"

Dadwar (Middle Persian: Dādwar, meaning "bearer of law") was a Sasanian administrative office which corresponded to a sort of judge, who, as a deputy of the mowbed (chief priest), evaluated civil cases at a district level. The (ham)shahr dadwar was the head of the judiciary.

== Sources ==
- Miri, Negin (2013). "Sasanian Administration and Sealing Practices". In Potts, Daniel T. (ed.). The Oxford Handbook of Ancient Iran. Oxford University Press. ISBN 978-0199733309.
- Shaki, Mansour (1993). "Dādwar, Dādwarīh". Encyclopaedia Iranica, Vol. VI, Fasc. 5. pp. 557–559.
