= Jamsheed Choksy =

Jamsheed K. Choksy is a Distinguished Professor, former Chair of the Department of Near Eastern Languages and Cultures, former Chair of the Department of Central Eurasian Studies, and current Director of the Inner Asian and Uralic National Resource Center at Indiana University - Bloomington. Choksy completed his undergraduate degree from Columbia University in 1985, where he studied with Ehsan Yarshater, Richard Bulliet, Ainslie Embree, James Russell, and Peter Awn. He went on to doctoral work at Harvard University from 1985 to 1991 where he studied with Richard Frye, Roy Mottahedeh, Clifford Lamberg-Karlovsky, and Annemarie Schimmel, and was elected a Junior Fellow (1987-1991). From there, he embarked on a career in academia, beginning as a Visiting Assistant Professor at Stanford University (1991-1993) and subsequently a tenure track professor at Indiana University in 1993, eventually holding appointments in a variety of different programs in that university. He has been a NEH Fellow and Member at the School of Historical Studies, Institute for Advanced Study in Princeton (1993-1994), a Guggenheim Fellow (1996), a Mellon Fellow at the Center for Advanced Study in the Behavioral Sciences, Palo Alto (2001-2002), and a Phi Beta Kappa Visiting Scholar (2018-2019).

In 2008, he was nominated by President George W. Bush to the National Council on the Humanities and served as a member of the council until 2019.

In 2022, he was elected a Fellow of the American Academy of Arts and Sciences.

Choksy is considered one of the foremost authorities on Iran, India, Islam, and Zoroastrianism, combining historical understanding to discuss modern issues and topics. An important piece of this research and his pieces in the foreign affairs and popular press, such as Foreign Affairs, Foreign Policy, Real Clear World, the Huffington Post and other venues, is pulling from his historical understanding of history, culture, and religion to illustrate how different cultures and people in the Middle East and Central Asia interact.

== Awards ==
- Fellow, American Academy of Arts and Sciences
- Fellow, American Numismatic Society
- National Endowment for the Humanities Fellowship
- Guggenheim Fellowship
- Member, National Council of the Humanities
- Mellow Fellowship
- American Philosophical Society Fellowship
- Fellow, Royal Asiatic Society of London
