= Guyim, Shiraz =

Guyim گويم
- Village
- Location within Iran
- Coordinates: 29°49′23″N 52°23′41″E
- Country: Iran
- Province: Fars
- County: Shiraz
- Bakhsh: Central
- Rural District: Derak

Population (2006)
  - Total: 7,297
- Time zone: UTC+3:30 (IRST)
  - Summer (DST): UTC+4:30 (IRDT)

Guyim (Persian: گويم, also Romanized as Gūyīm; also known as Gūyom and Gūyum) is a town in Derak Rural District, in the Central District of Shiraz County, Fars province, Iran. At the 2006 census, its population was 7,297, in 1,829 families.

== See also ==
- Ardashir-Khwarrah
