= Mobad =

Zoroastrian priest

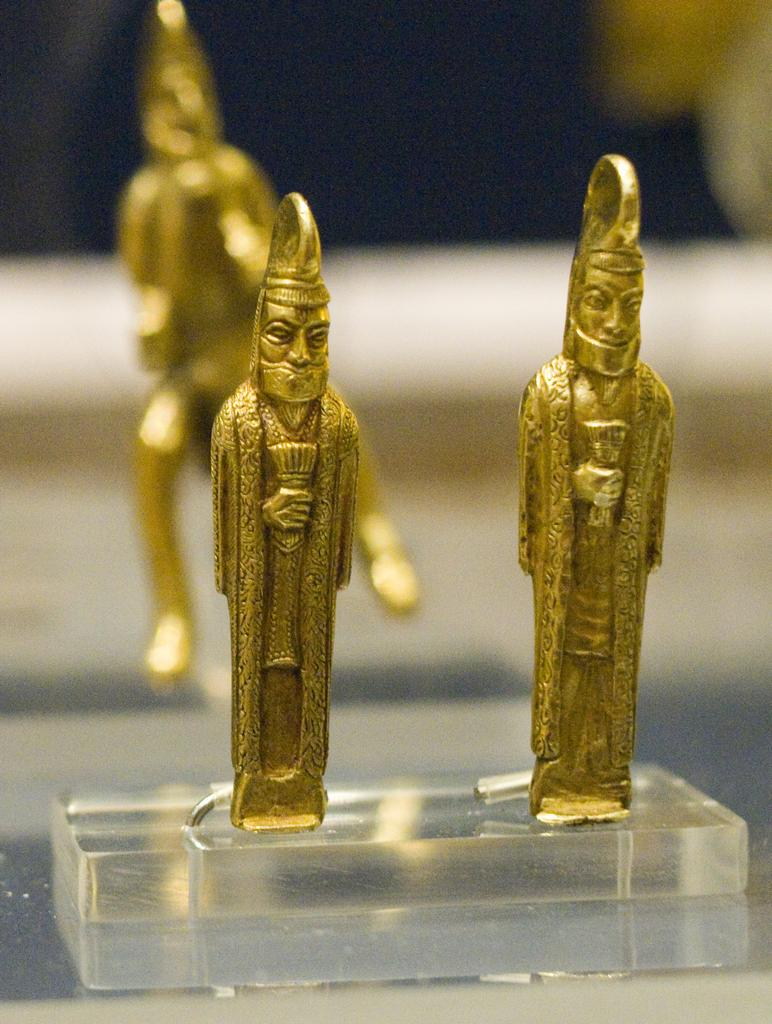
Golden statuettes of two mobads, Oxus Treasure

A mobed, mowbed, or mobad (Middle Persian: 𐭬𐭢𐭥𐭯𐭲) is a Zoroastrian cleric of a particular rank. Unlike a herbad (ervad), a mobed is qualified to serve as celebrant priest at the Yasna ceremony and other higher liturgical ceremonies. A mobed is also qualified to train other priests.

== Usage ==
In lay use, the term is also used as an honorific to denote any Zoroastrian priest of any rank. Hormizd I appointed Kartir mowbadān-mowbad "high priest of priests".

The term mobad is a contraction of Old Persian *magupati, the first half of the expression derived from magu- (= Avestan: 𐬨𐬊𐬖𐬎, romanized: moɣu-) and pati (= Avestan: 𐬞𐬀𐬌𐬙𐬌, romanized: paiti, lit. 'lord'). The word was borrowed as Georgian: მოგუ-ი mogu-i and Classical Syriac: ܡܘܗܦܛܐ, romanized: mawhəp̄āṭā and from Parthian as Old Armenian: մոգպետ, romanized: mogpet.

Through Old Persian: 𐎶𐎦𐏁, romanized: maguš and Ancient Greek: μάγος, romanized: magos, proto-Iranian *magu- is also identified as the origin of the Latin word magus, a "magian". Through the Greek adjective Ancient Greek: μαγικός, romanized: magikos and Old French: magique, mobed is distantly related to the English language word "magic".

== Mobedyars ==
Priests in the community in India, the Parsis, are required to be male from a priestly family (the "Athornan" class or caste). According to Parsi tradition, Athornan mobeds have held the responsibility of preserving and promoting religion since pre-Zoroastrian times of the mythical King Jamshid.

[I]n the early to mid 1900s, for various reasons, the young of the then mobeds were encouraged by their elders to be initiated as mobeds but to pursue other careers and professions. Though this resulted in a shortage of mobeds [in India], it generated an unexpected benefit to Zoroastrianism. Highly educated and enterprising young mobeds settled in North America following their secular studies and founded the mobed base for the benefit of North American Zoroastrians.

Due to the shortage of priests, the community in India considered a project to train any Parsi man to serve as a mobed assistant or paramobed in the 1970s. The plan was launched in the early 2000s using a new term for these priestly assistants: behdin pasbans.

In 1995, the North American Mobeds Council (NAMC) created a program to teach and ordain assistants called mobedyars or paramobeds to address the shortage of available mobeds across North America. The program was initially open to any male Zoroastrian, irrespective of Athornan (priestly) or Behdhin (non-priestly) caste or lineage. The first mobedyar was ordained in Virginia in late 1997. Another NAMC-trained mobedyar was ordained in California in 2004 after several years of serving the community.

In 2008, the NAMC amended the original resolution passed in 1999 to broaden the criteria for the eligibility and training of mobedyars to include women. As of 2010, the North American Mobeds Council had successfully trained six mobedyars to perform outer liturgical ceremonies and bereavement services in the absence of an ordained priest.

In 2009-2010, the chairman of the Council of Zoroastrian Priests in Tehran, Mobed Soroushpur, suggested opening the priesthood to women after research on ancient Zoroastrian documents that revealed evidence of female clergy in ancient Persian times. "The concepts of equality have always been at the basis of our culture. In antiquity, there were many female priests, politicians, warriors and this even up to the Sasanian time," he said. Potential corroboration may be found in the oral tradition of the Parsis, which acknowledges a female priest named Testar as among those who fled religious persecution and forced conversions in Arab-conquered Persia to establish a new homeland in Sanjan, Gujarat around the ninth century.

In 2011, eight women were certified to serve the community as mobedyars. However, female mobedyars in Iran may be restricted in their ability to serve their community in the same manner as mobeds, such as tending to fires in fire temples.

Zoroastrian women have since been ordained in Iran and North America to serve the community as mobedyars. Since the mobedyar program was initiated in North America, there has been some pushback on the restrictions placed on ordained mobedyars by the NAMC regarding the types of ceremonies mobedyars may perform. The community is grappling with the question of whether to permit any Zoroastrian to train to become a full-fledged mobed irrespective of caste, lineage, or gender. The concept of a universal priesthood would promote and encourage persons to train to become mobeds and mobedyars "regardless of their gender, ancestry or background".

== Sources ==
- Boyce, Mary (2001) [1979], Zoroastrians, their religious beliefs and practices, London: Routledge, ISBN 0-415-23902-8, OCLC 45438877
