= Sarab-e Bahram =

Sarab-e Bahram سراب بهرام
- Village
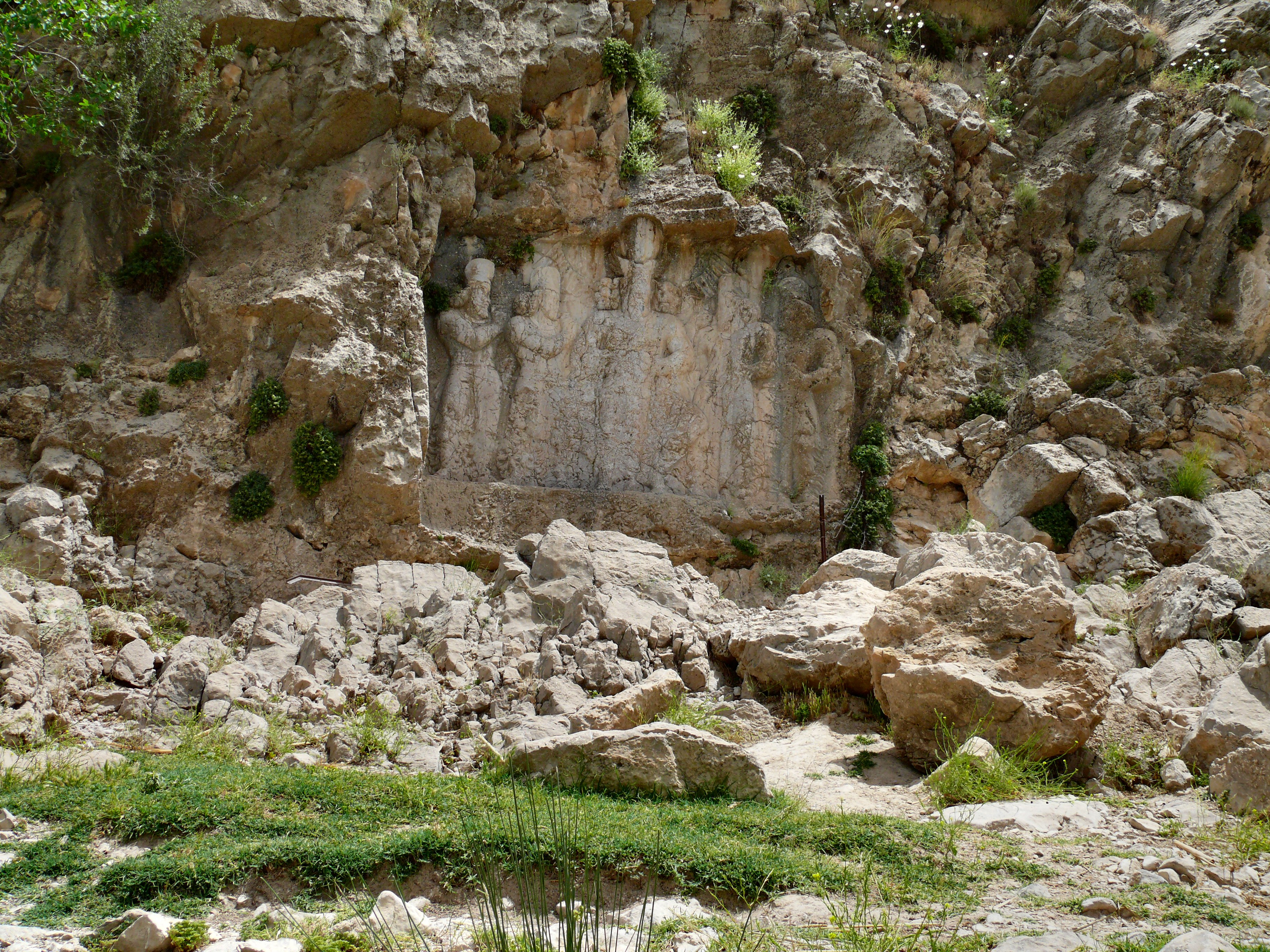

- Location within Iran
- Coordinates: 30°02′48″N 51°33′31″E
- Country: Iran
- Province: Fars
- County: Mamasani
- Bakhsh: Central
- Rural District: Bakesh-e Yek

Population (2006)
  - Total: 398
- Time zone: UTC+3:30 (IRST)
  - Summer (DST): UTC+4:30 (IRDT)

Sarab-e Bahram (Persian: سراب بهرام, also Romanized as Sarāb-e Bahrām and Sarab Bahram) is a village in Bakesh-e Yek Rural District, in the Central District of Mamasani County, Fars province, Iran. At the 2006 census, its population was 398, in 80 families.
