= Peroz of Meshan =

3rd century Sasanian prince

Peroz of Meshan (Middle Persian: 𐭯𐭩𐭫𐭥𐭰 Pērōz) was a Sasanian prince active during the reign of his grandfather, king (shah) Shapur I (r. 240–270). He was a son of Shapur Meshanshah and possibly the latter's wife Denag. He had at least six brothers, all of whom are mentioned in the trilingual inscription (c. 262) of Shapur I. Nothing more is known about Peroz. He may be the same the person as his namesake mentioned in the Paikuli inscription (c. 293) of Narseh (r. 293–302), in which he appears as a court dignitary. According to the inscription, he supported Narseh against Bahram III (r. 293) in the struggle for the throne.

== Sources ==
- Weber, Ursula. "Pērōz, Sohn Šābuhrs, des Königs von Mēšān, Enkel Šābuhrs I. [ŠKZ I 27]" (PDF). dr-ursula-weber.de.
