= Shapurdukhtak =

Wife of Sasanian king Bahram II

- Bānbishnān bānbishn ("Queen of Queens")
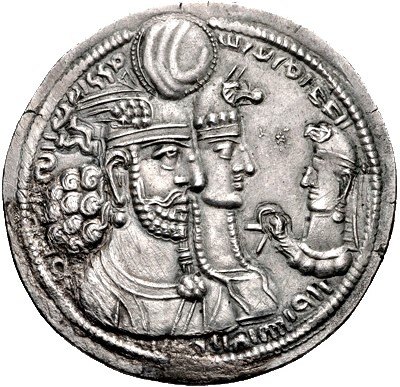
- Coin of Bahram II with Shapurdukhtak and Bahram III.
- Spouse: Bahram II
- Issue: Bahram III
- House: House of Sasan
- Father: Shapur Meshanshah
- Mother: Denag
- Religion: Zoroastrianism

Shapurdukhtak (Middle Persian: Šābuhrduxtag, literally "daughter of Shapur") was a 3rd-century Sasanian queen (banbishn). She was the wife of her cousin, king Bahram II (r. 274–293).She was one of the most powerful and influential women of the Sasanian era. Being among the wise and capable ladies of her time, she lived with such authority that, despite the formidable and fearsome personality of the chief priest Kartir, she exercised influence over him as well, and, known as the “Queen of Queens,” she enjoyed significant power in state affairs.

== Biography ==
She was the only daughter of Shapur Meshanshah, a Sasanian prince who governed Meshan, and was the son of the Sasanian shah Shapur I. Her mother was a queen named Denag. Shapurdukhtak had many brothers: Hormizdag, Odabakht, Bahram, Shapur, Peroz, and Hormizd. She was probably raised in Meshan, which was then governed by her father. In 260, her father died and was probably succeeded by Denag as the governor of Meshan.

In 274, her cousin Bahram II ascended the throne, and she was shortly married to the latter, and was given the title of bānbishnān bānbishn, meaning "queen of queens". In c. 281, her brother Hormizd revolted against Bahram II, and was supported by the inhabitants of Eastern Iran, including the inhabitants of Gilan. Hormizd's revolt was finally suppressed in 283, and he was shortly executed under the orders of Bahram II, who appointed his and Shapurdukhtak's own son Bahram III as the governor of Sakastan.

Shapurdukhtak is also portrayed on rock reliefs along with Bahram II. One of the reliefs is situated at Sar Mashhad south of Kazerun, which portrays Bahram as a hunter who has slayed a lion whilst throwing his sword at another. Shapurdukhtak is holding his right hand in a signal of safeguard, whilst Kartir and another figure, most likely a prince, are watching. The scenery has been the subject of several symbolic and metaphorical meanings, thought it is most likely supposed to portray a simple royal display of braveness during a real-life hunt. The other relief at Naqsh-e Rostam, portrays Bahram II standing whilst being surrounded by his family members and attendants; to his left are the sculptures of Shapurdukhtak, a prince, the crown prince Bahram III, Kartir, and Narseh. To his right are the sculptures of Papak, and two other grandees.

Bahram II also minted several contains showing a portrait of himself along with Shapurdukhtak and Bahram III. Shapurdukhtak is wearing different headdress' on some of the coins, sometimes with a boar, griffin, horse or eagle. The precise meaning of this, however, is unclear. She seems to have still been living at the time of her husband's death in 293, and probably died some years later.

== Political Life ==
It seems that the groundwork for the succession of Bahram II by Kartir had been laid. Thus, under Kartir’s influence and with the support of her husband Shapurdokhtak, she attained such a position despite the presence of other claimants to the throne. Similarly, he agrees with Brusius, considering Shapurdokhtak to be the daughter of Shapur I, and believes that she was one of the influential women of the court who played a role in appointing Bahram II to the throne. Moreover, the privileges granted to Kartir during Bahram II’s reign may also have originated from this action. Furthermore, by relying on her husband Shapurdokhtak, she was able to benefit from this success. The depiction of Shapurdokhtak, Bahram II’s wife, on the coins also reflects her high status in Bahram’s reign. Bahram II was the first and only Sasanian king to mint coins depicting his wife alongside him. As mentioned earlier, this was very likely directly connected to the events at the beginning of his reign. His concern over internal threats, whether in the form of rebellions or coups by members of the royal family, as well as pressure from the Romans following the capture of Ctesiphon, compelled him to consider the appointment of a successor as quickly as possible. Considering the events that occurred during Bahram II’s reign and the importance of choosing a legitimate successor, the timing of the minting of his four groups of coins can be understood as follows:A. Coins depicting Bahram alone likely belong to the early years of his reign, between 274–277 CE.seems that the minting of coins featuring both him and Queen Shapurdokhtak……occurred after criticisms regarding the manner in which he came to power, likely intended solely to legitimize Bahram’s royal authority. On the dual coins of Bahram II and the queen, her name is inscribed as “Shapurdokhtak, (Queen of Queens).”

Considering Bahram II’s age at the time of his accession, the likelihood that he had children, particularly with Shapurdokhtak, was minimal. This is confirmed by the three-person coins depicting Bahram II, the queen, and Bahram III. On some of these coins, Bahram’s image shows a young child who could not have been older than seven to ten years.A highly significant detail in these coins is the proclamation of Shapurdokhtak as crown princess on the reverse side, which highlights the special status of the Sasanian queen in the court not only in relation to Bahram himself but also in terms of her influence and prestige among the nobility and magnates. Although Bahram III’s image appears on the obverse of the coin, it is Shapurdokhtak on the reverse who symbolizes the heirship. These coins depict Bahram II on the front and his heir, Bahram III, facing him. Since Bahram III is depicted as slightly older and more adolescent in these coins, and the special crown symbolizing the heirship is placed on the animal-shaped crown and on the reverse above his head, this period can be dated to the official proclamation of Bahram III as crown prince. It also corresponds to his governance over Sakastan, without requiring the regency of his mother Shapurdokhtak, likely between 288–293 CE.

The depiction at Naqsh-e Rustam: the presence of Shapurdokhtak alongside Bahram II indicates her prominent and influential position in establishing the legitimacy of Bahram II’s reign compared to other rivals.

== Sources ==
- Brosius, Maria (2000). "WOMEN i. In Pre-Islamic Persia". Encyclopaedia Iranica, Vol. London et al.
- Curtis, Vesta Sarkhosh; Stewart, Sarah (2008). The Sasanian Era. I.B.Tauris. pp. 1–200. ISBN 9780857719720.
- Frye, Richard Nelson (1984). The History of Ancient Iran. C.H.Beck. pp. 1–411. ISBN 9783406093975. "The history of ancient iran."
- Shahbazi, A. Shapur (1988). "Bahrām II". Encyclopaedia Iranica, Vol. III, Fasc. 5. pp. 514–522.
- Gignoux, Philippe (1994). "Dēnag". Encyclopaedia Iranica, Vol. VII, Fasc. 3. p. 282.
