= Odabakht =

3rd century Sasanian prince

Odabakht was a 3rd-century Sasanian prince. He was the son of Shapur Mishanshah, a Sasanian prince who governed Maishan, and was the son of the Sassanian shah Shapur I. Odabakht's mother was a queen named Denag. Odabakht had many other siblings named Hormizdag, Hormizd, Bahram, Shapur, Peroz, and Shapurdukhtak. In 260, his father died and was probably succeeded by Denag as the governor of Maishan.

Odabakht probably died before the ascension of his uncle Narseh in 293.

== Sources ==
- Frye, Richard Nelson (1984). The History of Ancient Iran. C.H.Beck. pp. 1–411. ISBN 9783406093975.
- Gignoux, Philippe (1994). "DĒNAG". Encyclopaedia Iranica, Vol. VII, Fasc. 3. p. 282.
