= Hormizd of Sakastan =

Grandson of Sassanian king Shapur I (died 283)

Hormizd of Sakastan was a Sasanian prince who was the leader of a revolt in Sakastan (modern Sistan, Iran) and its surrounding regions. He was the son of Shapur Mishanshah, a Sasanian prince who governed Maishan, and was the son of the Sassanian shah Shapur I. Hormizd's mother was Denag. Hormizd's siblings were Hormizdag, Odabakht, Bahram, Shapur, Peroz, and Shapurdukhtak. In 260, his father died and was probably succeeded by Denag as the governor of Maishan. In 274, he was appointed as the governor of Sakastan and its surrounding regions. Three years later, when his cousin Bahram II ascended the throne, Hormizd's sister Shapurdukhtak married the shah. In c. 281, Hormizd revolted against Bahram II, and was supported by the inhabitants of eastern Iran, including the inhabitants of Gilan. Hormizd's revolt was finally suppressed in 283. Hormizd was captured and executed on the orders of Bahram II, who appointed his own son Bahram III as governor of Sakastan.

== Sources ==
- Pourshariati, Parvaneh (2008). Decline and Fall of the Sasanian Empire: The Sasanian-Parthian Confederacy and the Arab Conquest of Iran. London and New York: I.B. Tauris. ISBN 978-1-84511-645-3.
- Shapur Shahbazi, A. (2005). "SASANIAN DYNASTY". Encyclopaedia Iranica, Online Edition.
- Frye, Richard Nelson (1984). The History of Ancient Iran. C.H.Beck. pp. 1–411. ISBN 9783406093975. "The history of ancient iran."
- Gignoux, Philippe (1994). "DĒNAG". Encyclopaedia Iranica, Vol. VII, Fasc. 3. p. 282.

Preceded by Bahram II	Governor of Sakastan; 274–283	Succeeded by Bahram III
