= Vahman-Ardashir =

Vahman-Ardashir or Bahman-Ardashir, also known as Forat Meshan (also spelled as Mayshan, Maysan, Meshun and Maishan), was an ancient town and sub-district in the Sasanian province of Meshan, which is situated in present-day southern Iraq.

== History ==
According to the two Persian historians Hamza Isfahani and Ibn al-Faqih, Vahman-Ardashir was constructed (or re-built) by the first king of the Sasanian Empire, Ardashir I (r. 224–242), while some other sources such as al-Tabari, gives the legendary Iranian king Kay Bahman credit for the foundation of the town. However, mention of this town first appears in 544, when the Nestorian bishop of Vahman-Ardashir is appointed as the metropolitan of Meshan. According to Ibn Khordadbeh, Vahman-Ardashir, along with Meshan (a sub-district named after the province), Dastimeshan, and Abar-Kavadh, formed the four sub-districts of a district named Shad Bahman (also spelled Vahman), which also known as "the Tigris district". An estuary named Bahmanshir, is known to be derived from the name of Vahman-Ardashir.

In 635, during the Muslim conquest of Persia, Vahman-Ardashir was seized by the Arab military officer Utbah ibn Ghazwan. The town would later be involved in revolts by the Zanj in 689–690, 695, and during the height of the power of the Zanj, known as the Zanj Rebellion, which lasted from 869 to 883. During the 13th-century, Vahman-Ardashir was destroyed.

== Sources ==
- Morony, M. (1988). "BAHMAN-ARDAŠĪR". Encyclopaedia Iranica, Vol. III, Fasc. 5. p. 494.
- Houtsma, Martijn Theodoor (1993). "The Encyclopedia of Islam, Volume 5". The Encyclopaedia of Islam, Vol. V. Brill. pp. 1–578. ISBN 90-04-09791-0.
- de Planhol, X. (1988). "BAHMANŠĪR". Encyclopaedia Iranica, Vol. III, Fasc. 5. pp. 500–501.
