= Wahnam =

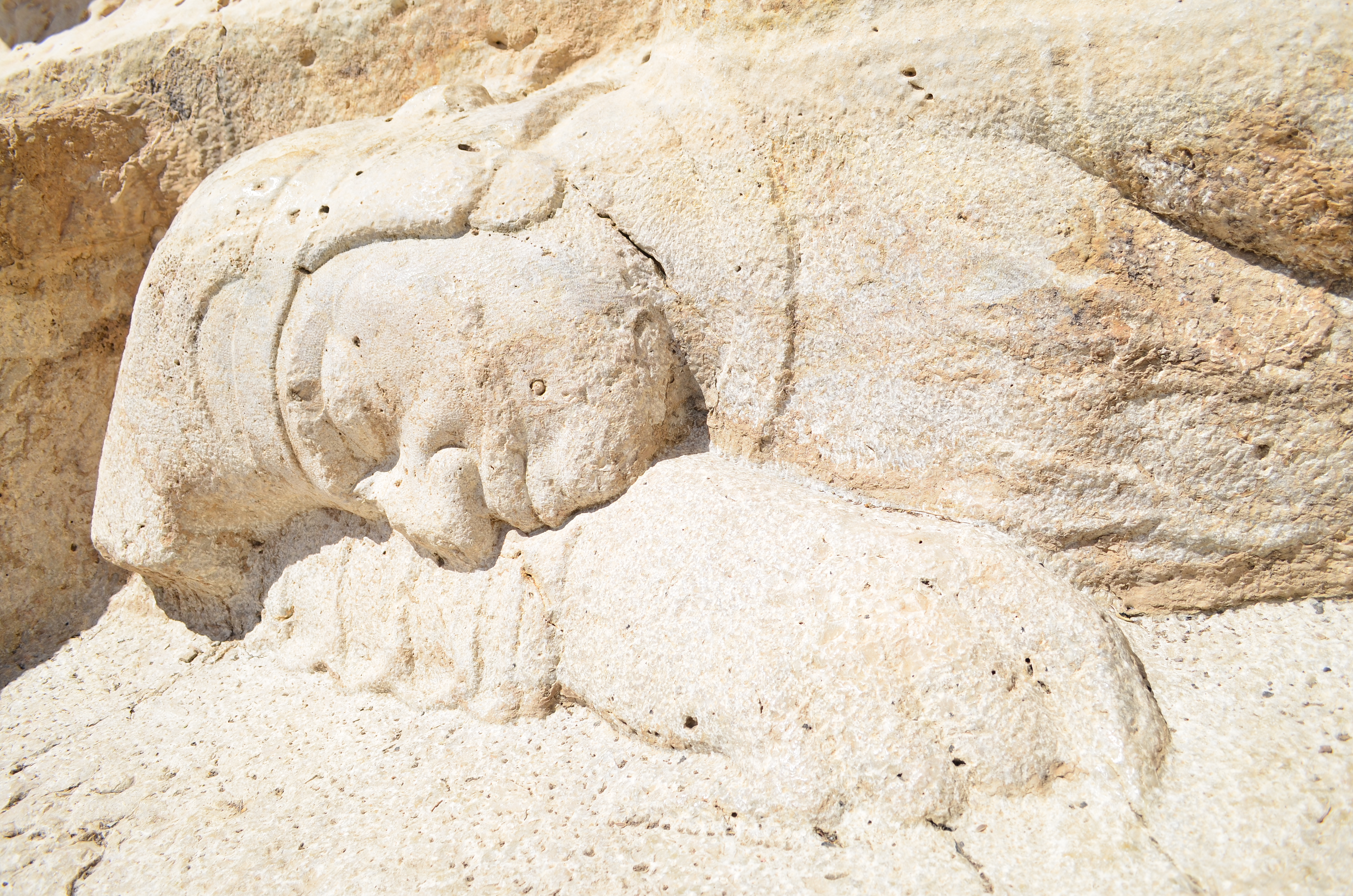
Relief of a fallen enemy under the king's horse, probably Wahnam

Wahnam (also spelled Vahunam) was an Iranian aristocrat who played a key role in accession of Bahram III to the throne of the Sasanian Empire in 293. His efforts eventually proved fruitless, as a few months later he and Bahram III were forced to surrender to the esteemed Sasanian prince Narseh, who ascended throne and had Wahnam executed.

== Biography ==
Following the death of Bahram II in 293, his son Bahram III was unwillingly proclaimed shah in Pars by a group of nobles led by Wahnam and supported by Adurfarrobay, governor of Meshan. However, Bahram III was considered a weak ruler by the other nobles, who decided to pledge allegiance to Narseh, the last remaining son of Shapur I (r. 240–270), and someone who was perceived as being a stronger leader and one who would be able to bring glory to Iran. Four months into Bahram's reign, Narseh was summoned to Mesopotamia at the request of many members of the Iranian nobility. He met them in the passage of Paikuli in the province of Garmekan, where he was firmly approved and likely also declared shah for the first time.

The reasons behind the nobles favour of Narseh might have been due to his jurisdiction as governor, his image as an advocate of the Zoroastrian religion and as an insurer for harmony and prosperity of the empire. His ancestry from the early Sasanian family probably also played a role. In order to avoid bloodshed, Narseh proposed to make peace with both Bahram III and Wahnam. Both seem to have agreed, as no accounts of battles have been made. The reason behind Bahram and Wahnam's quick agreement to peace may have been due to desertion amongst many of Bahram's men. Bahram abdicated as shah and was probably spared, whilst Wahnam was executed when Narseh entered the Sasanian capital of Ctesiphon.

== Sources ==
- Shahbazi, A. Shapur (2005). "SASANIAN DYNASTY". Encyclopaedia Iranica, Online Edition.
- Weber, Ursula (2016). "Narseh". Encyclopaedia Iranica.
- Daryaee, Touraj (2009). Sasanian Persia: The Rise and Fall of an Empire. I.B.Tauris. pp. 1–240. ISBN 978-0857716668.
- Klíma, O. (1988). "Bahrām III". Encyclopaedia Iranica, Vol. III, Fasc. 5. pp. 514–522.
- Kia, Mehrdad (2016). The Persian Empire: A Historical Encyclopedia [2 volumes]: A Historical Encyclopedia. ABC-CLIO. ISBN 978-1610693912.
