= Abar-Kavad =

Coordinates: 31°16′49″N 47°29′34″E

Abar-Kavad (also spelled Abar-Kawad; meaning "Superior is Kavad"), known in Arabic sources as Abarqubadh and Abazqubadh, was a sub-district in the Sasanian province of Meshan.

During the Muslim conquest of Persia, it was defended by a certain Faylakan. In 635 (or 637) Abar-Kavad was seized by the Arab military officer Utbah ibn Ghazwan.

== Sources ==
- Morony, M. (1988). "BAHMAN-ARDAŠĪR". Encyclopaedia Iranica, Vol. III, Fasc. 5. p. 494.
- Houtsma, Martijn Theodoor (1993). "The Encyclopedia of Islam, Volume 5". The Encyclopaedia of Islam, Vol. V. Brill. pp. 1–578. ISBN 90-04-09791-0.
- de Planhol, X. (1988). "BAHMANŠĪR". Encyclopaedia Iranica, Vol. III, Fasc. 5. pp. 500–501.
- Daryaee, Touraj (2009). "Abarqubādh". In Fleet, Kate; Krämer, Gudrun; Matringe, Denis; Nawas, John; Rowson, Everett (eds.). Encyclopaedia of Islam (3rd ed.). Brill Online. ISSN 1873-9830.
