= Faylakan =

Faylakan (also spelled Filkan/Filakan) was a Persian nobleman who served as the governor of the Sasanian province of Meshan. In 637, he was defeated and killed during the Arab invasion of Iran.

== Sources ==
- Daryaee, Touraj (1971). "Abarqubādh". In Lewis, B.; Ménage, V. L.; Pellat, Ch. & Schacht, J. (eds.). The Encyclopaedia of Islam, Second Edition. Volume III: H–Iram. Leiden: E. J. Brill. OCLC 495469525.
- Zakeri, Mohsen (1995). Sāsānid Soldiers in Early Muslim Society: The Origins of ʿAyyārān and Futuwwa. Wiesbaden: Otto Harrassowitz. ISBN 978-3-447-03652-8.
