= Shapur Meshanshah =

Sasanian prince and Governor of Mesha (died 260)

Shapur Meshanshah (Middle Persian: 𐭱𐭧𐭯𐭥𐭧𐭥𐭩 𐭱𐭠𐭤𐭬𐭩𐭱𐭠𐭭), was a 3rd-century Sasanian prince. He was the second son of the Sassanian shah Shapur I, and was married to a certain queen named Denag, who bore him several children: Hormizd, Hormizdag, Odabakht, Bahram, Shapur, Peroz, and Shapurdukhtak. At an unknown date, Shapur was appointed governor of Meshan by his father. Sometime later, he gave his wife the honorific title of Dastgerd-Shapur. He died in 260, and was probably succeeded by his wife as the governor of Meshan.

== Sources ==
- Frye, Richard Nelson (1984). The History of Ancient Iran. C.H.Beck. pp. 1–411. ISBN 9783406093975.
- Shahbazi, A. Shapur (1988). "Bahrām II". Encyclopaedia Iranica, Vol. III, Fasc. 5. pp. 514–522.
- Gignoux, Philippe (1994). "Dēnag". Encyclopaedia Iranica, Vol. VII, Fasc. 3. p. 282.

Preceded by Unknown	Governor of Meshan ???–260	Succeeded by Denag
