= Paikuli inscription =

Ancient bilingual inscription in Iraqi Kurdistan

Paikuli Tower
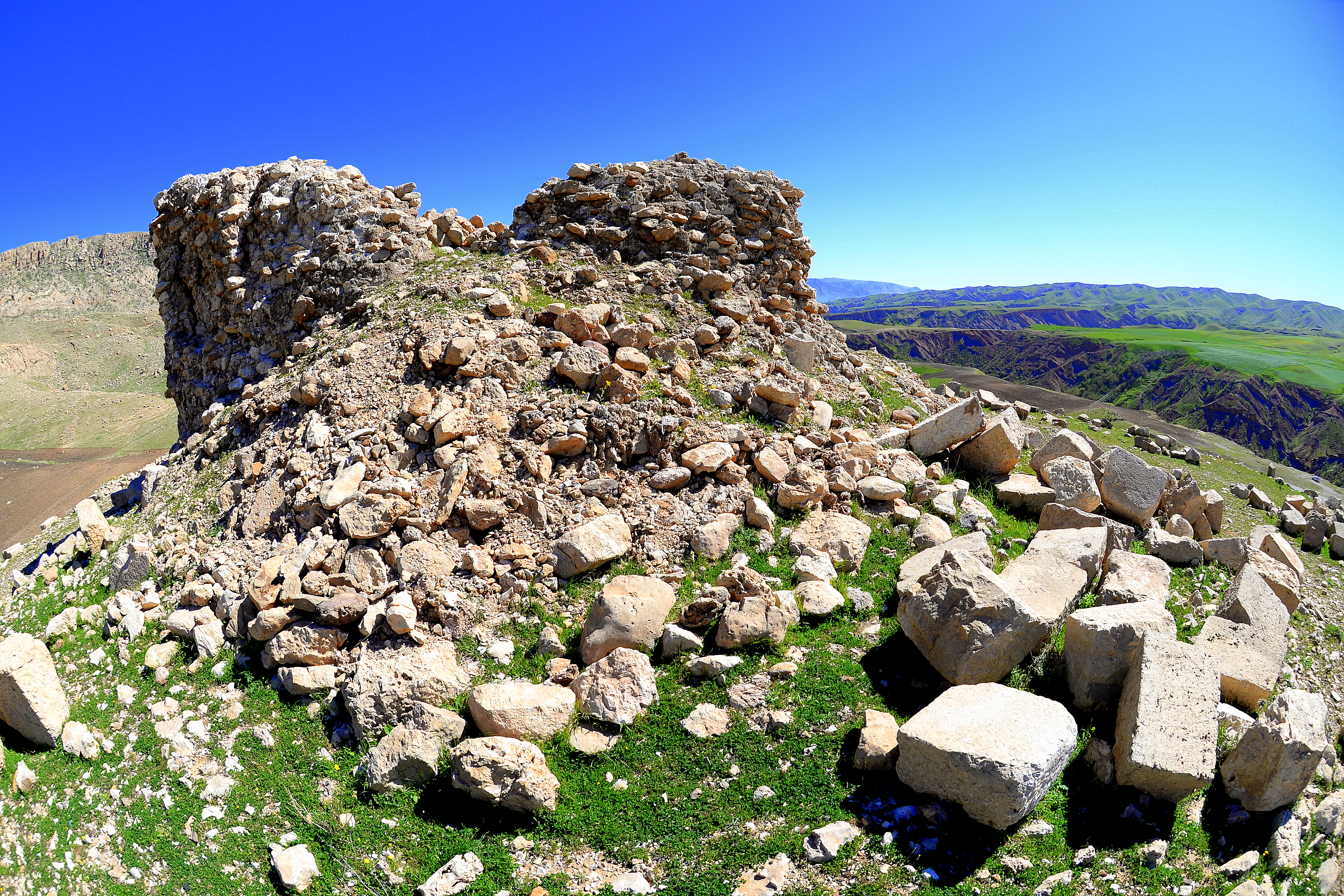
- Paikuli Tower
- Interactive map of Paikuli Tower
- Location: Sulaymaniyah Governorate, Iraq
- Coordinates: 35°5′53.91″N 45°35′25.95″E
- Designer: Narseh
- Type: Tower
- Material: Stone
- Beginning date: 3rd century AD

The Paikuli inscription (Kurdish: پەیکوڵی, romanized: Peykulî, Persian: پایکولی, in Arabic: بيكولي) is a bilingual text corpus in Parthian and Middle Persian, inscribed on the stone blocks of the Paikuli Tower's walls during the reign of the Sasanian ruler Narseh (r. 293–303). The tower is located in the southern part of Iraqi Kurdistan, near the modern-day village of Barkal in the Sulaymaniyah Governorate, Iraq. These inscribed stone blocks are now housed in the Sulaymaniyah Museum, with the field only containing the stones used in the tower's construction.

The inscription was erected as a monument to victory and explains how and why the Sasanian emperor Narseh overthrew his grandnephew Bahram III (r. 293) from power. In 293 Narseh marched from Armenia in open revolt against his grandnephew with a host of supporters and allies, whose names are recorded on the Paikuli inscription.

== Location and study ==
The monument of Paikuli, called a but-khāna 'idol-house' by locals, is located on the Iraqi side of the Iran–Iraq border, south of Sulaymaniyah in Iraqi Kurdistan and north of Qasr-e Shirin in Iran. In ancient times, the road from Ctesiphon to Azerbaijan passed through this area. The monument was visited by several travelers in the 19th century; at that time, it consisted of a ruined square tower with stone blocks, some of which bore inscriptions, scattered all around it. The stone blocks originally covered the tower on all sides. Henry Rawlinson made drawings of 32 inscribed blocks in 1844, on the basis of which Edward Thomas published the text with extensive commentary in 1868. Other Iranologists, such as Martin Haug, studied the inscriptions. In 1924, Ernst Herzfeld published a volume with photographs and a study of the monument and the inscriptions, which he read and translated mostly correctly. In 1978–1983, H. Humbach and Prods Oktor Skjærvø published a reconstruction and study of the text of the inscription. Since 2006, an Italian team led by Sapienza University of Rome has been studying the monument, surveying the area and studying the materials from the monument now held at the Sulaymaniyah Museum. As a result of these surveys, 19 new inscribed blocks (11 Middle Persian and 8 Parthian) were identified; they were published by Carlo Cereti and Gianfilippo Terribili in 2014. Several massive busts of Narseh have also been found at the site.

== Background and content ==
In 293, the Sasanian prince Narseh, son of Shapur I (r. 240–270), marched from Armenia (of which he was the Sasanian viceroy or "King of the Armenians") in open revolt against his grandnephew Bahram III (r. 293) with a host of supporters and allies. After his victory, Narseh had the bilingual (Middle Persian and Parthian) inscription erected on the spot where he had met with his noble supporters, who had come to the border of the Sasanian province of Asoristan to pledge allegiance to him. It is a monument to his victory and explains how and why he removed his grandnephew from power. The two versions of the text are nearly identical and fall into two main parts: a narration of the events of the succession crisis, and a long list of Narseh's supporters.

According to the inscription, Narseh's supporters invited him to come to Iran (Eranshahr) and take the throne after a certain "Wahnam, son of Tatrus" crowned Bahram III—son of the previous ruler Bahram II (r. 274–293)—in secret and without the acclamation of the aristocracy. As other sources indicate, this was against the established norms of succession. In the inscription, Wahnam is called an "assistant of Ahriman" (the evil spirit in Zoroastrianism), and it is suggested that Narseh was desired as a ruler because of his experience as viceroy of Armenia; his ability to preserve peace in the Sasanian realm; his pious reputation; and his "origin from the primordial branch of the royal Sasanian family". At the end of the inscription, it is declared that "Caesar and the Romans were in gratitude(?) and peace and friendship" with Narseh, which F. C. Andreas interpreted as referring to a victory over the Roman caesar Galerius, concluding that the inscription must have been made before Narseh's defeat at the hands of Galerius in 297.

Narseh mentions both the chief Zoroastrian deity Ohrmazd (Ahura Mazda) and the goddess Anahid (Anahita), suggesting that he had a special interest in her cult, which was important under his grandfather Ardashir I (originally, the Sasanian dynasts were caretakers of the temple of Anahid in Istakhr, but Bahram II granted authority over the temple to the high priest Kartir). According to Cereti and Terribili, the monument itself was titled Pērōz-Anāhīd-Narseh, which they gloss as "Narseh victorious by the grace of Anahid". Narseh also mentions his title "King of the Armenians" several times in the inscription, even though by that time he already had the grander title of King of Kings (shahanshah). In light of this fact and the mentions of Anahid (whose cult was prominent in Armenia), Carlo Cereti raises the question: "Did Narseh knowingly choose to emphasize the role of this deity on the one hand to highlight continuity with his grandfather, his father and his brother, and on the other to please his Armenian supporters, as well as other traditionalists?"

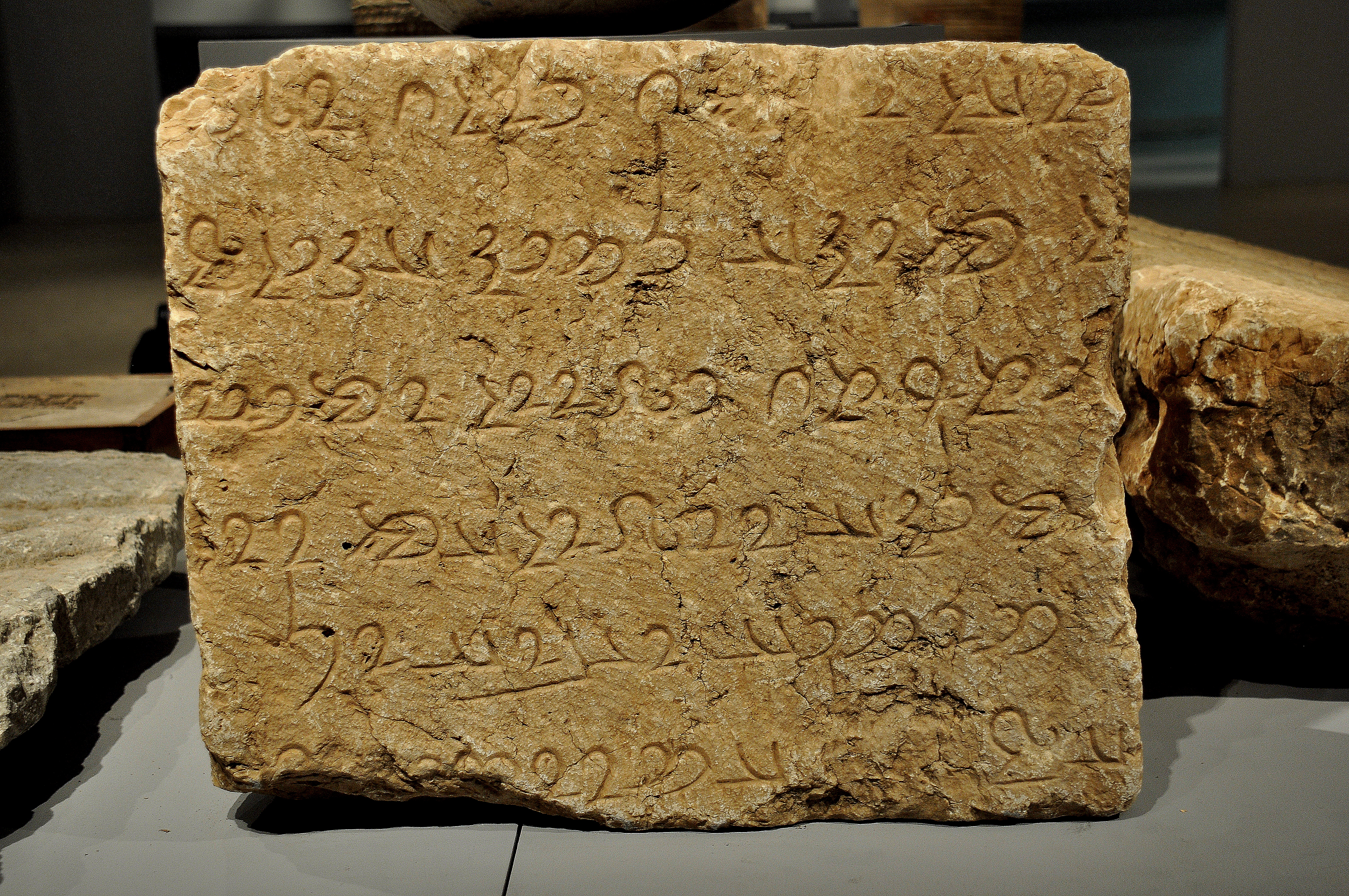
Stone block, D3, with Inscriptional Pahlavi (middle Persian) wrtitings

== As a historical source ==
Shigeo Mori argues that the Paikuli inscription follows the traditional Middle Eastern narrative structure of a king achieving dominance with divine assistance, and that it "seems doubtful whether the narration Narseh told can be accepted as a historical fact." This viewpoint has been criticized by Touraj Daryaee, who states that the fact that the events are narrated according to an epic formula does not mean the inscription is unusable as a historical source.

== Gallery ==
The Sulaymaniyah Museum in Iraqi Kurdistan opened a new gallery on 10 June 2019, dedicated to the Paikuli Tower, its inscription, and King Narseh.

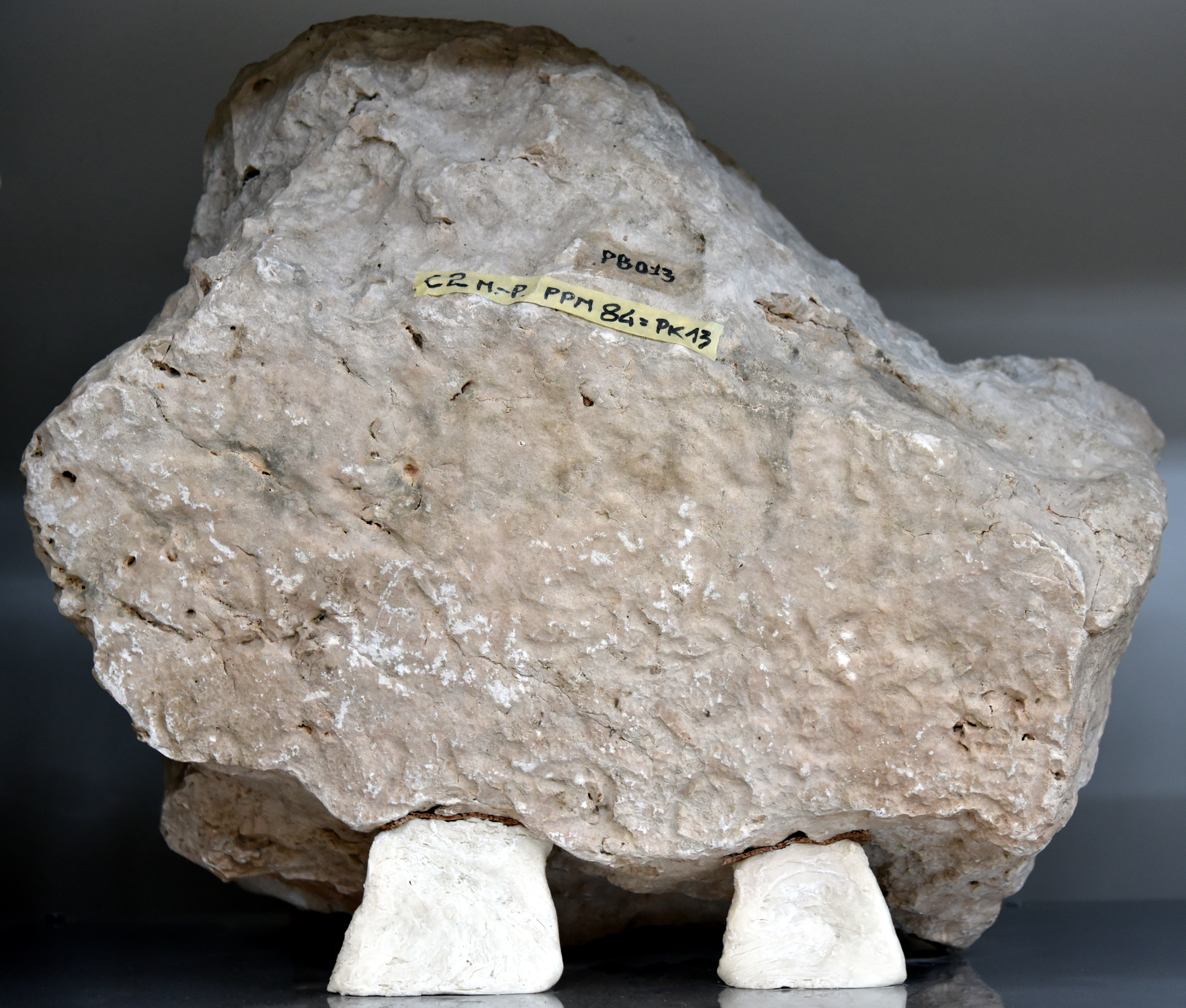
Recently discovered C2 inscribed stone block, Middle Persian script, from the Sasanian Paikuli Tower, Sulaymaniyah Museum

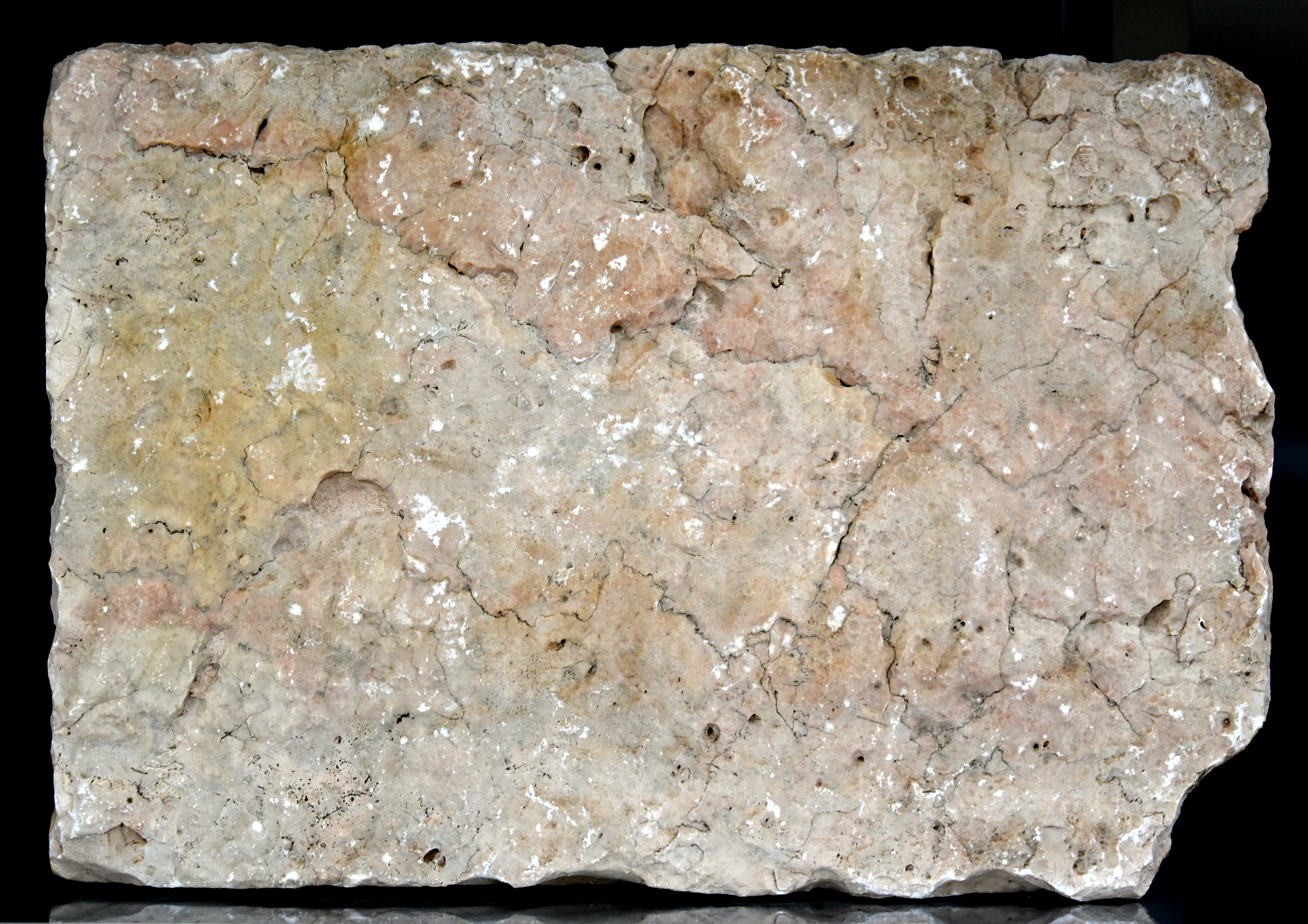
Recently discovered c12 inscribed stone block, Parthian script, from the Sasanian Paikuli Tower, Sulaymaniyah Museum

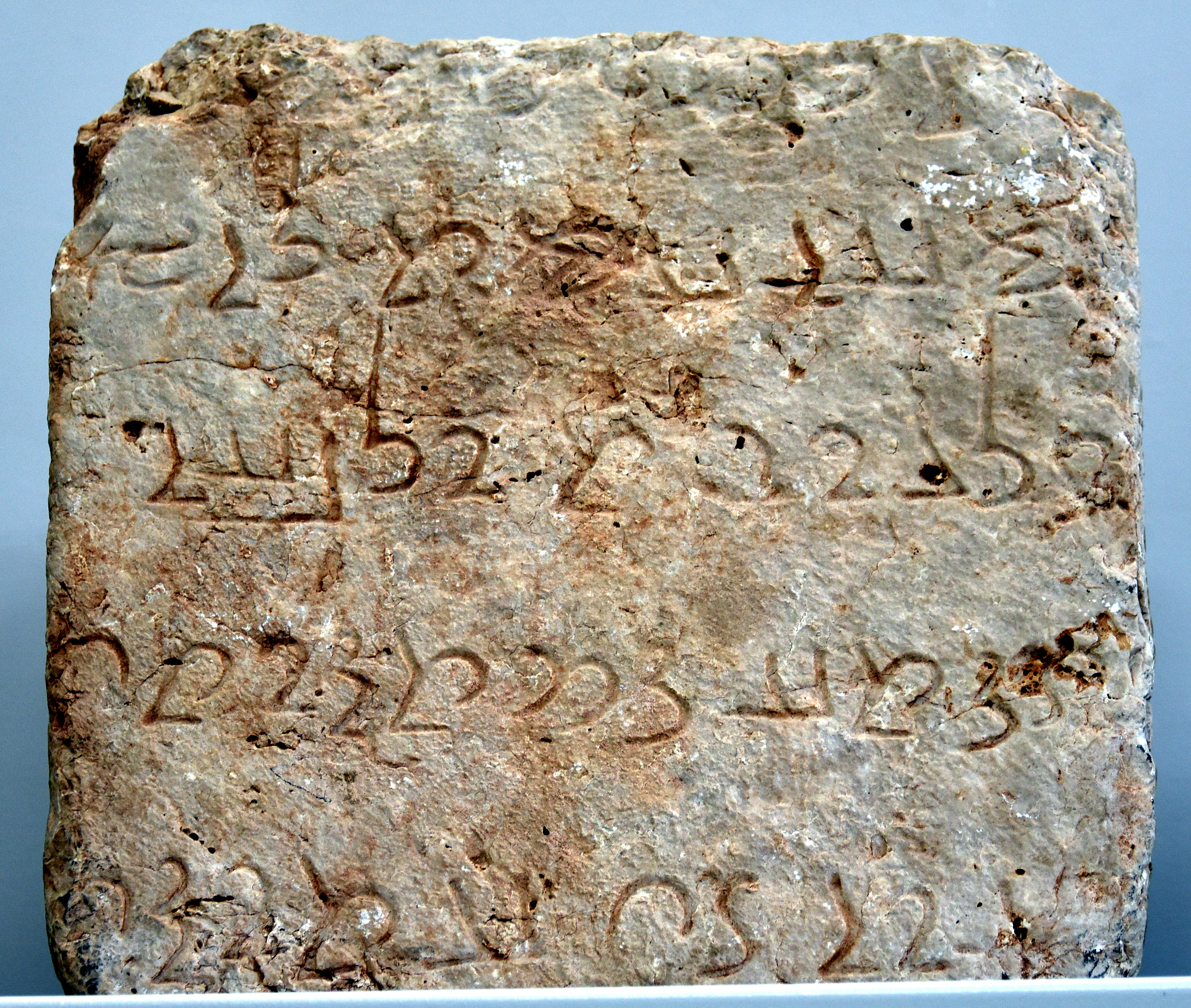
A2 inscribed stone block, Middle Persian script, from the Sasanian Paikuli Tower, Sulaymaniyah Museum

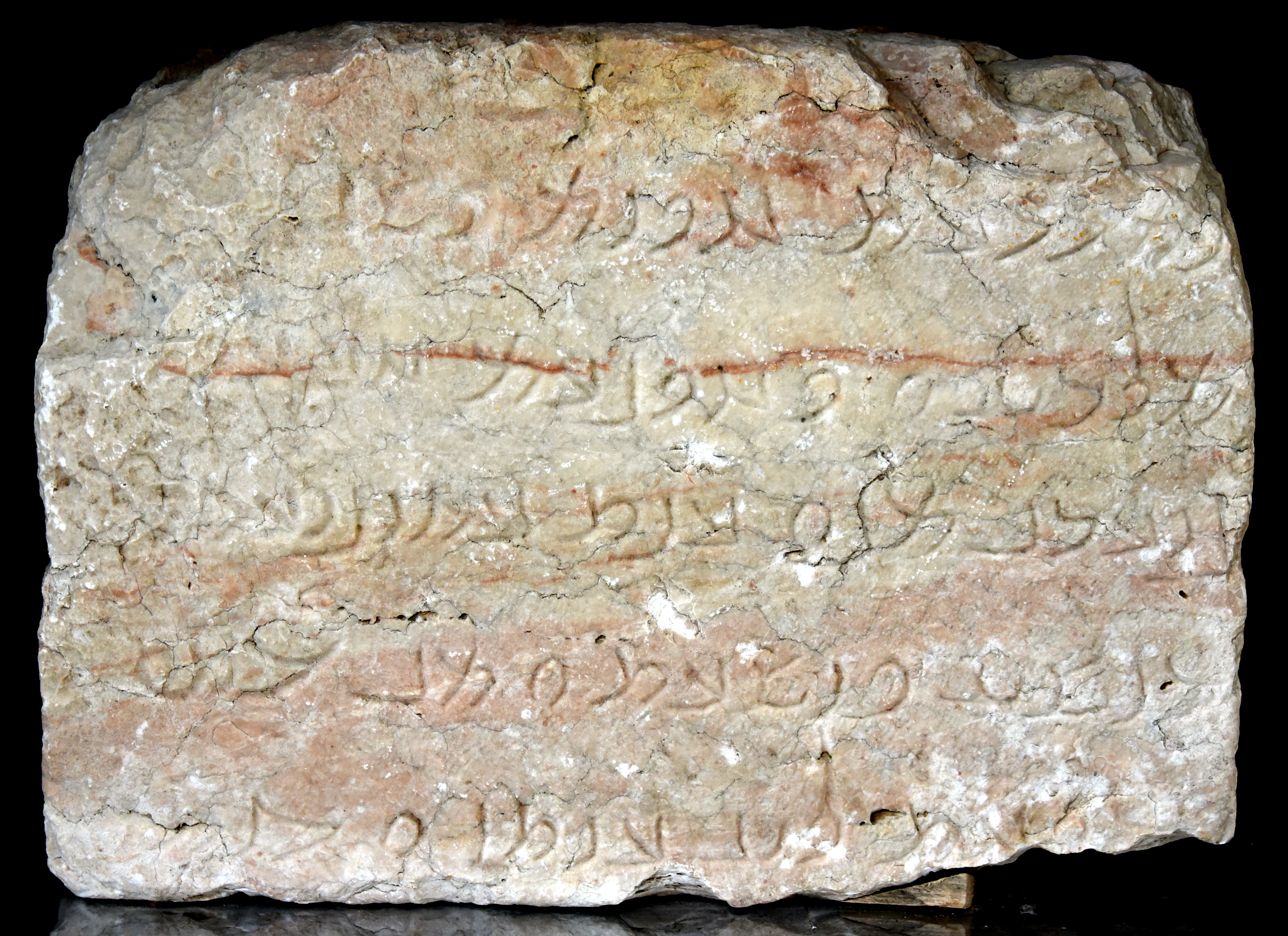
d3 inscribed stone block, Parthian script, from the Sasanian Paikuli Tower, Sulaymaniyah Museum

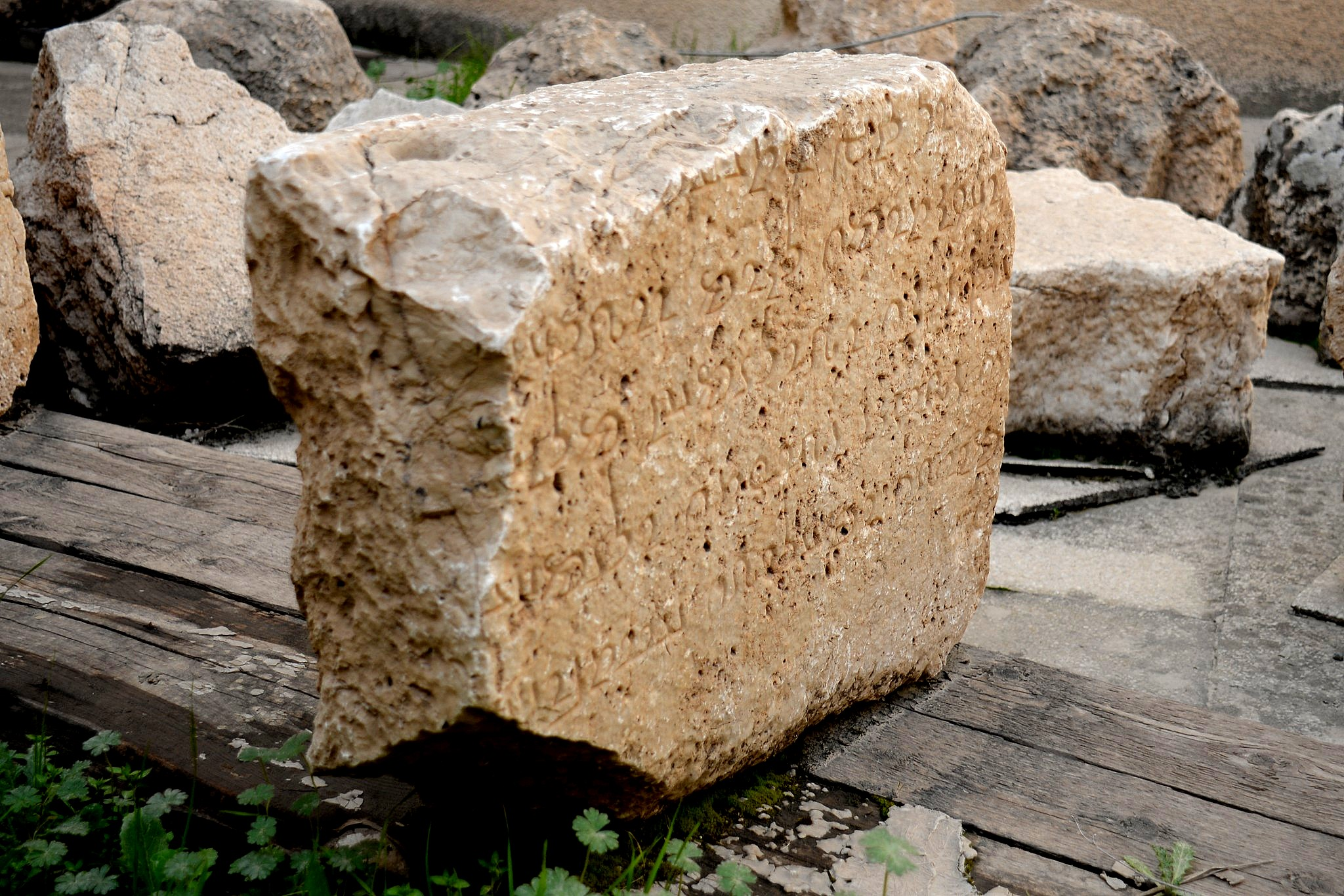
One of the inscribed stone blocks from the Paikuli Tower of Narseh. Late 3rd century AD. Sulaymaniyah Museum

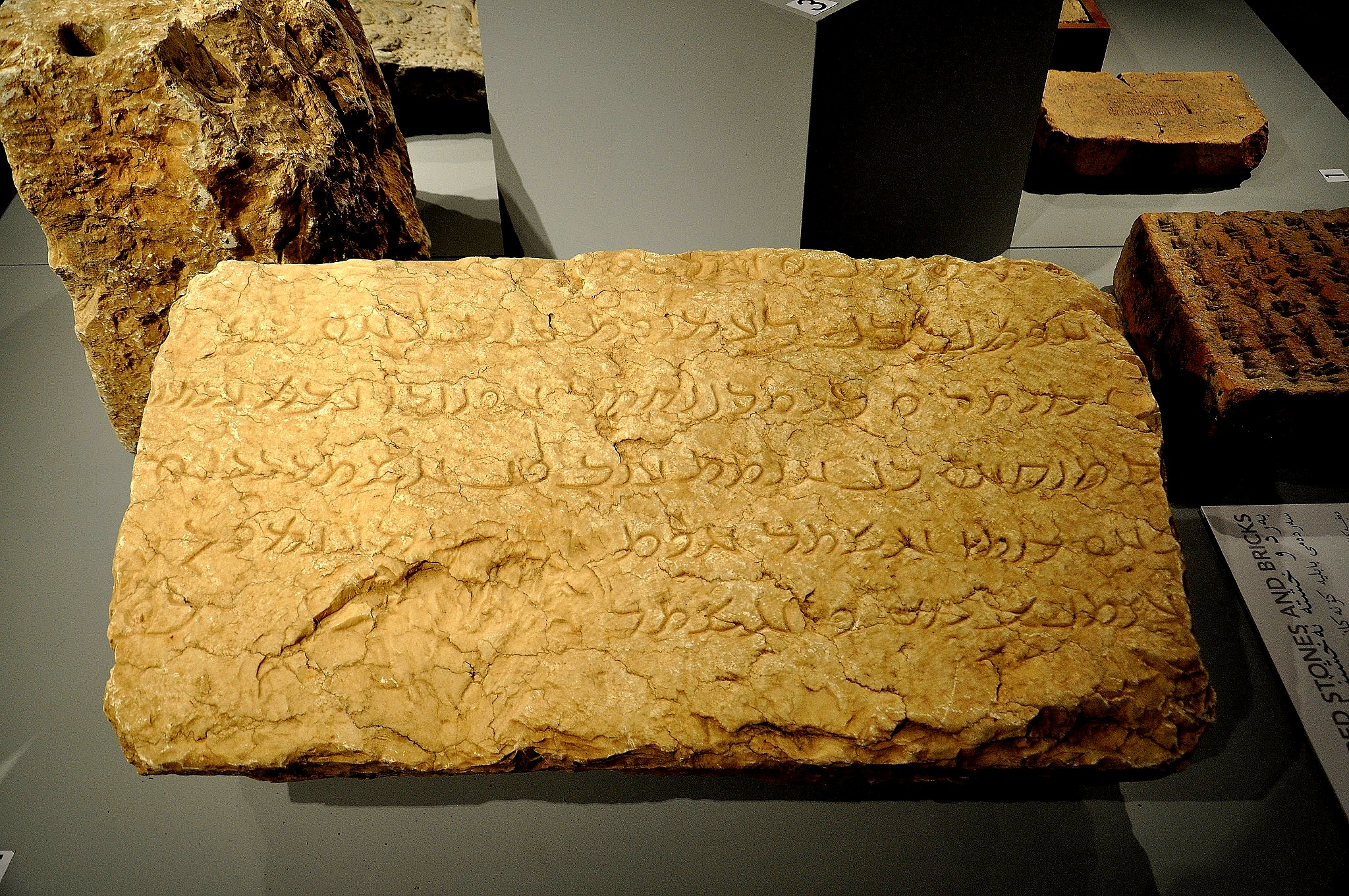
f7 block from the Paikuli Tower inscribed with Parthian language. Sasanian, reign of Narseh, late 3rd century AD. From Sulaymaniyah, Iraq. Sulaymaniyah Museum

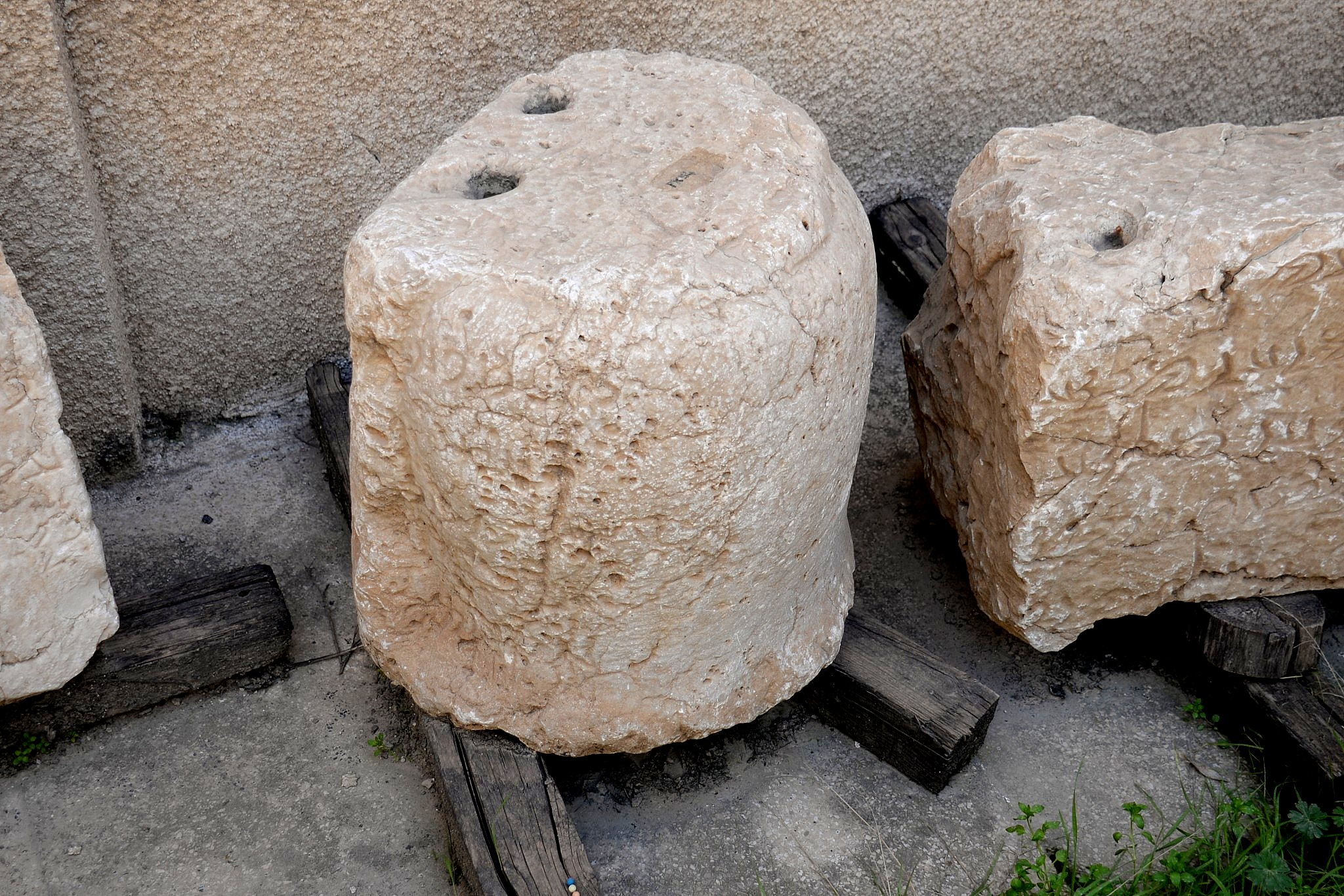
Newly discovered f1, Parthian inscription, block from the Paikuli Tower of Narseh, Sulaymaniayh Museum

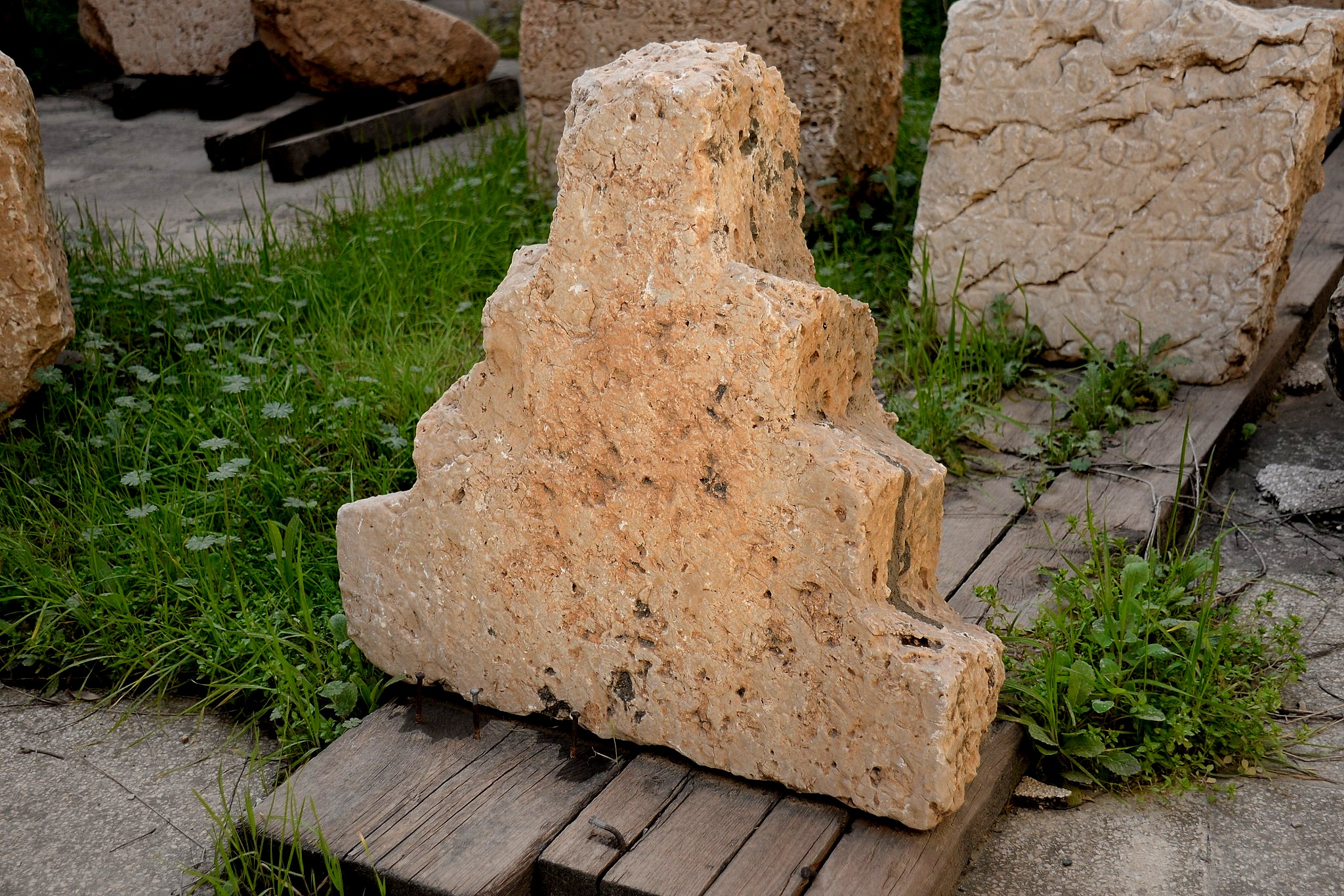
One of the non-inscribed rounded stone blocks from the Paikuli Tower of Narseh. Sulaymaniyah Museum

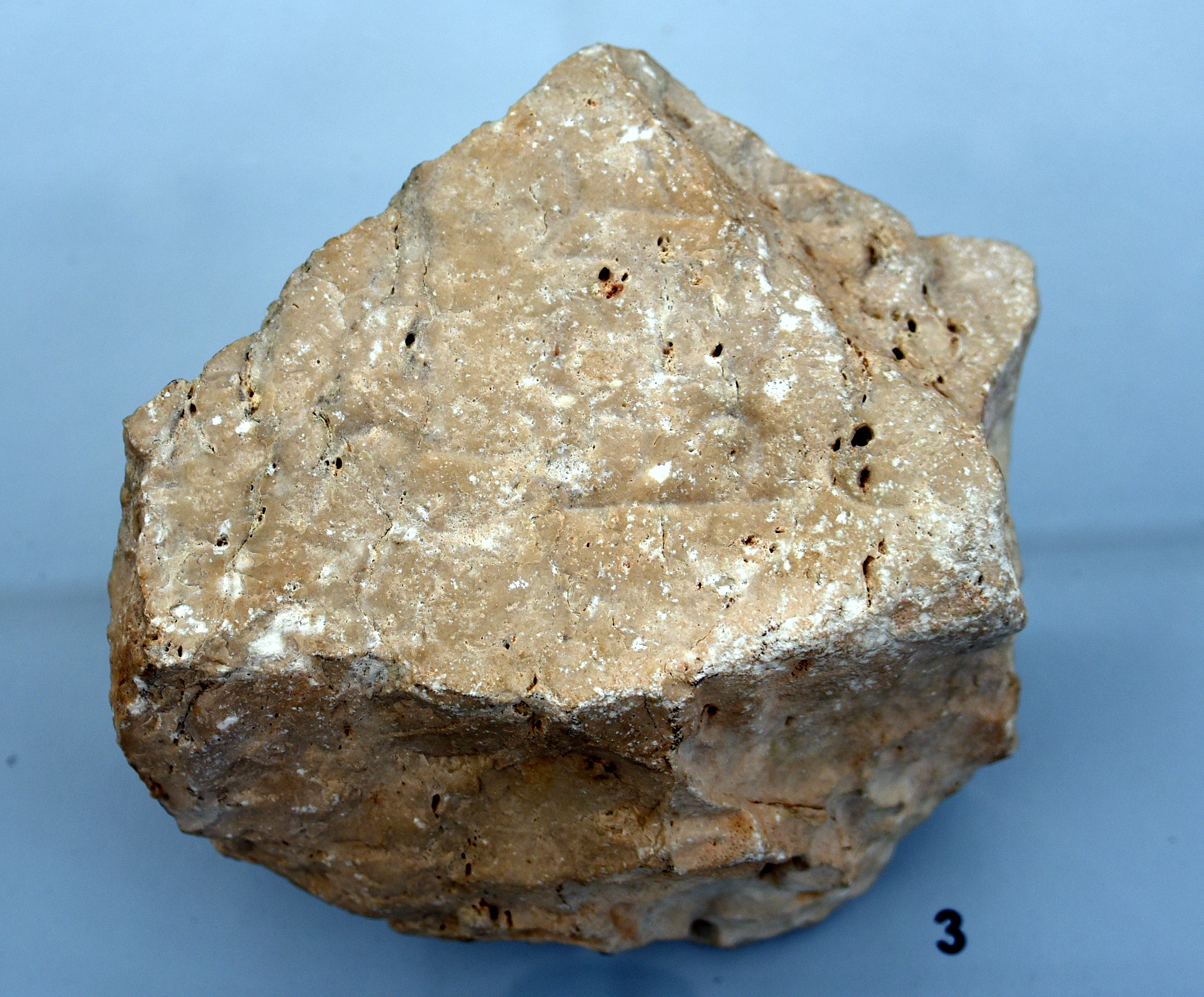
Newly discovered fragment of stone block G6, Middle Persian script, Sasanian Paikuli Tower, Sulaymaniyah Museum

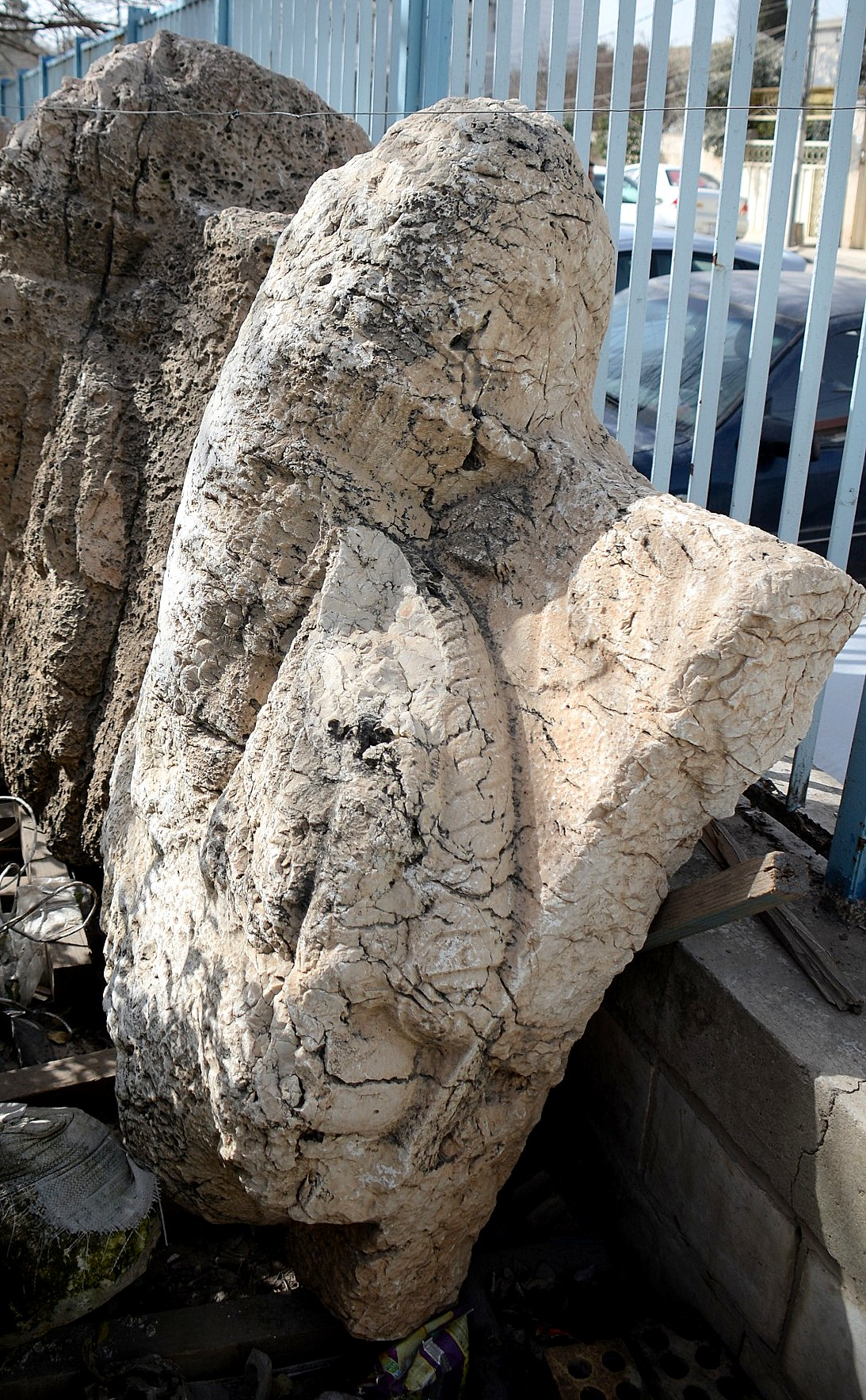
One of the busts of the Sasanian king Narseh. Late 3rd century AD. From the Paikuli Tower, Sulaymaniyah, Iraq. Sulaymaniyah Museum

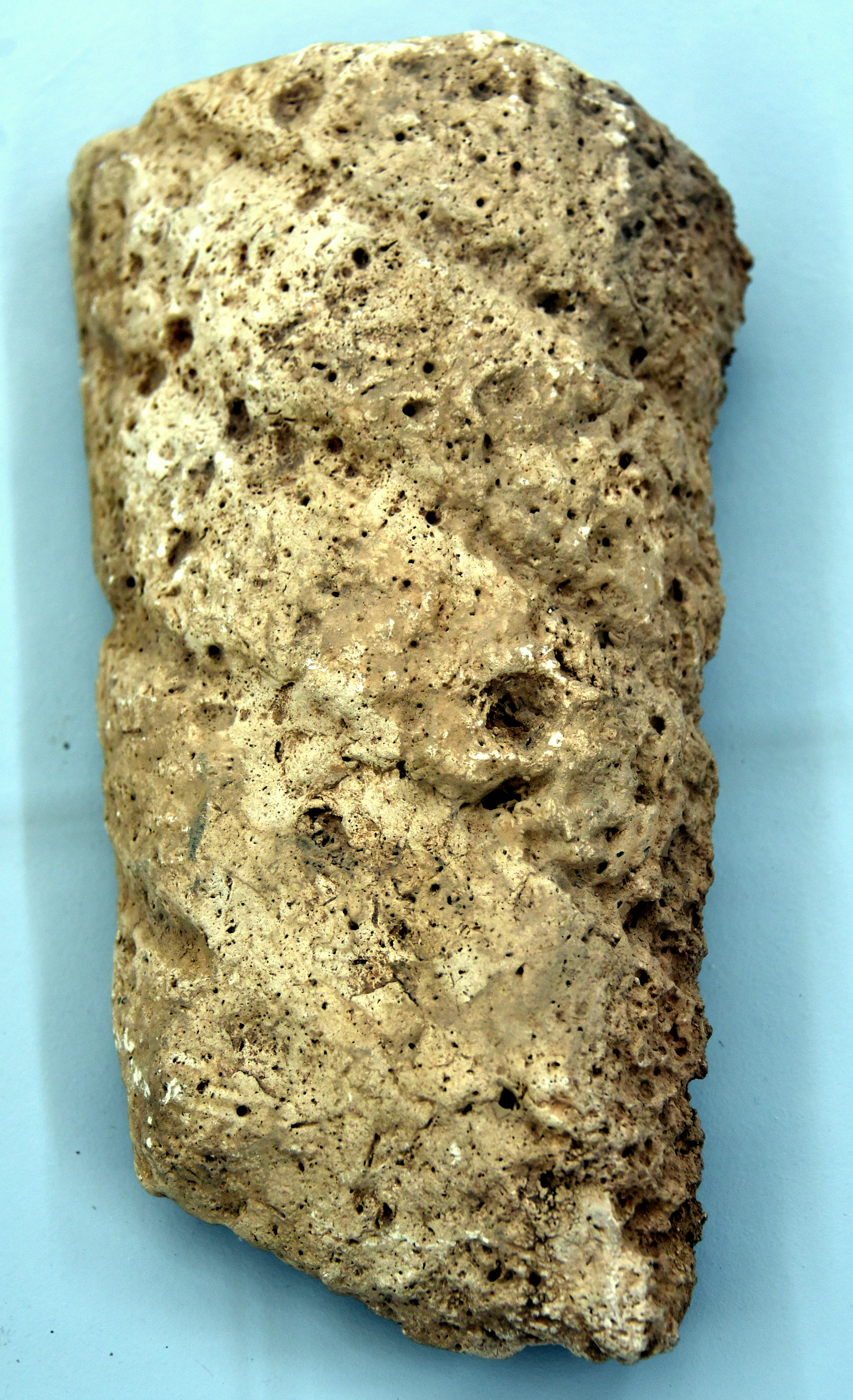
Recently discovered fragment of a braid of hair of Narseh's bust, from the Sasanian Paikuli Tower, Sulaymaniyah Museum

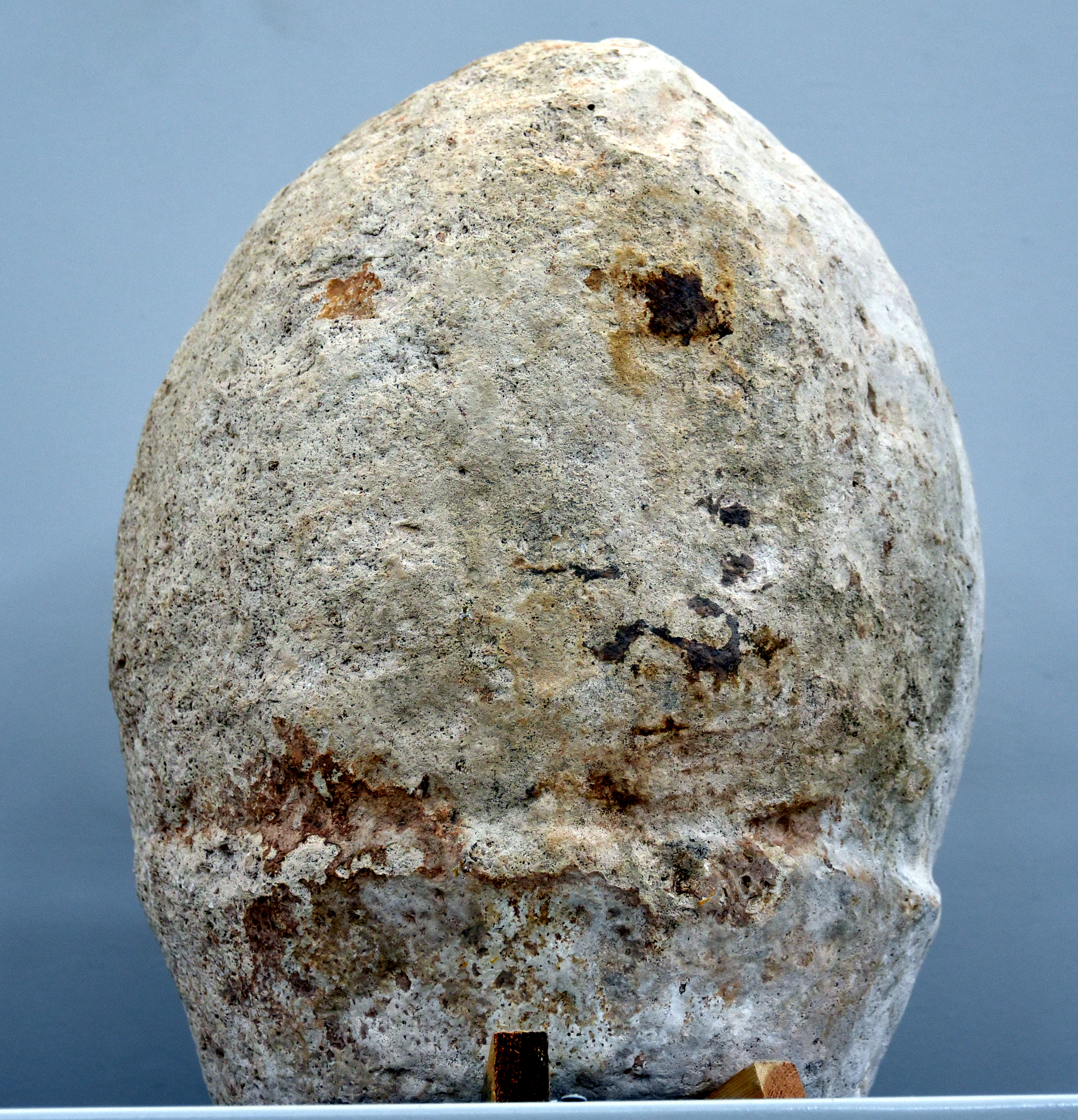
Part of Narseh headdress from the Sasanian Paikuli Tower, Iraq

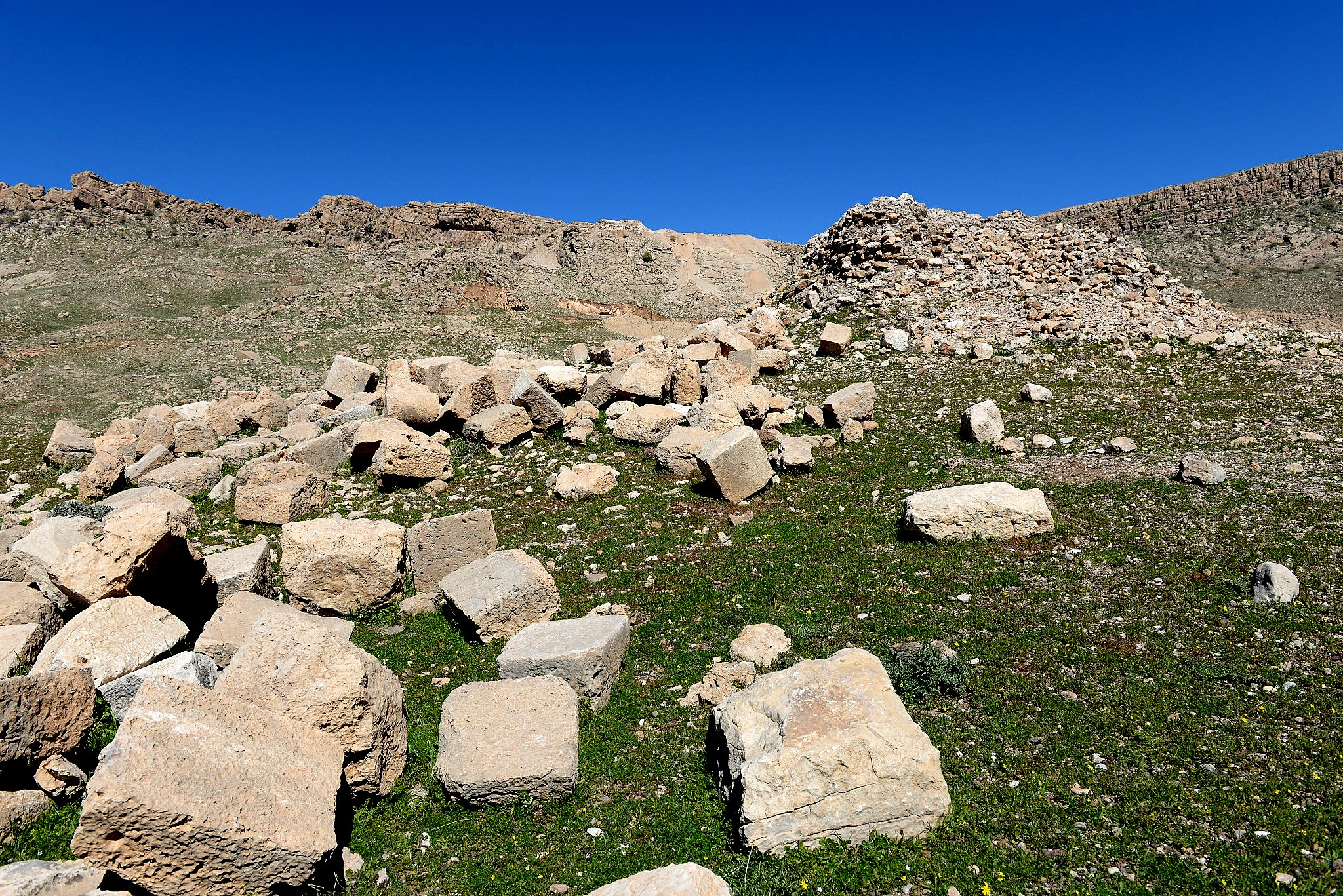
Non-inscribed stone blocks scattered around the Paikuli Tower of Narseh. Sulaymaniyah Governorate, Sulaymaniyah Museum

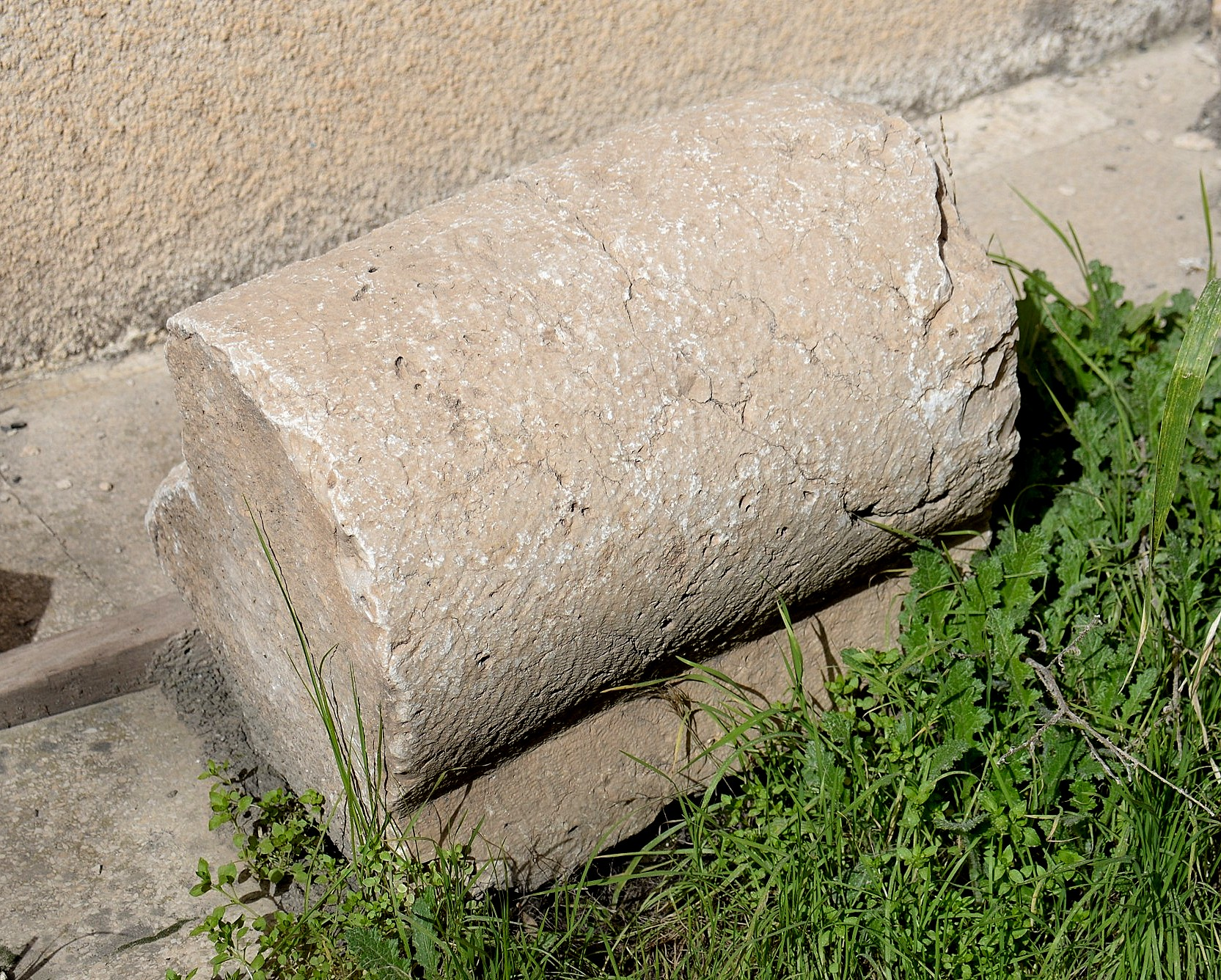
One of the non-inscribed rounded stone blocks from the Paikuli Tower of the Sasanian king Narseh. Sulaymaniyah Museum

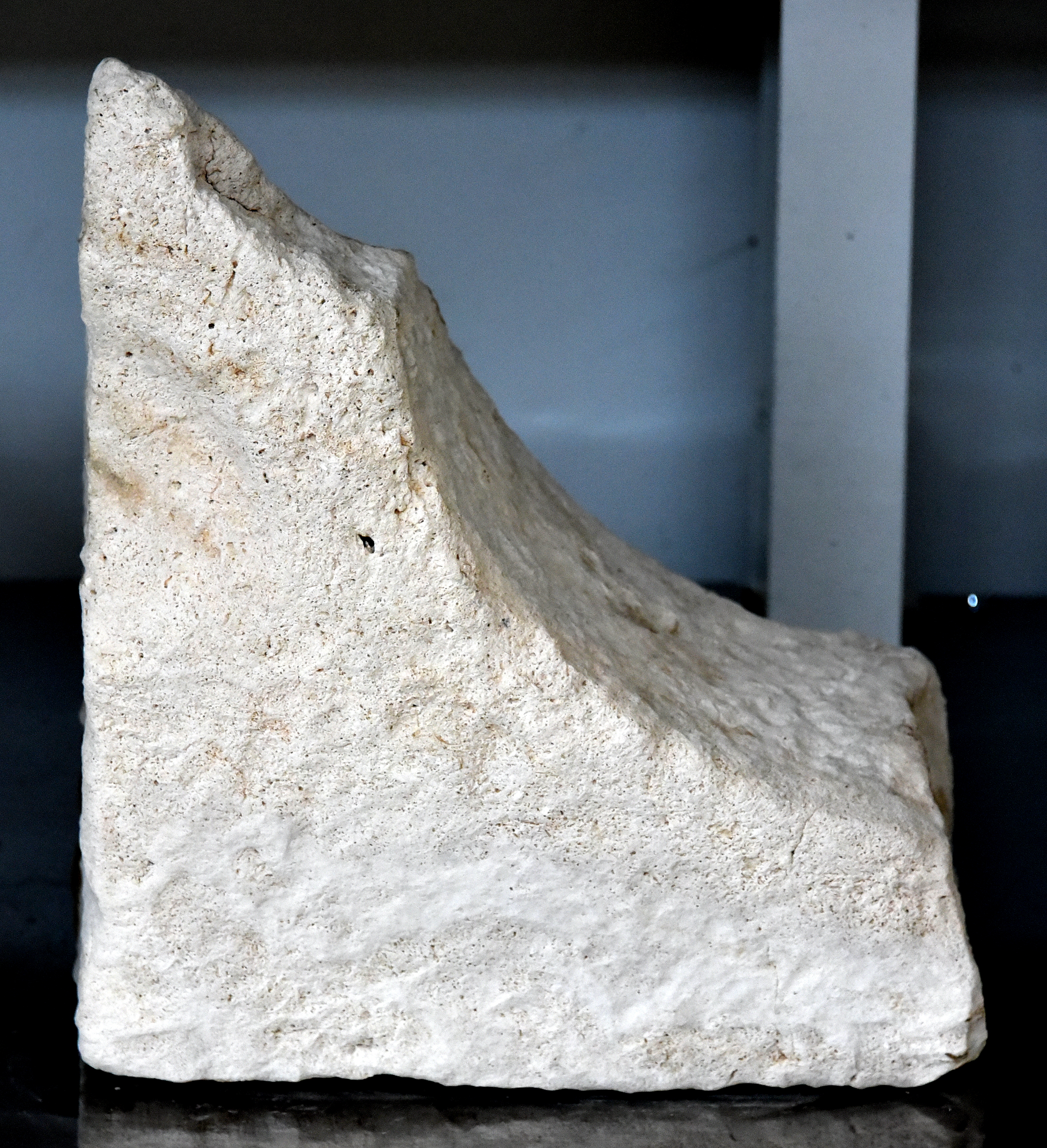
Non-inscribed building stone of the Sasanian Paikuli Tower of Narseh, Sulaymaniyah Museum

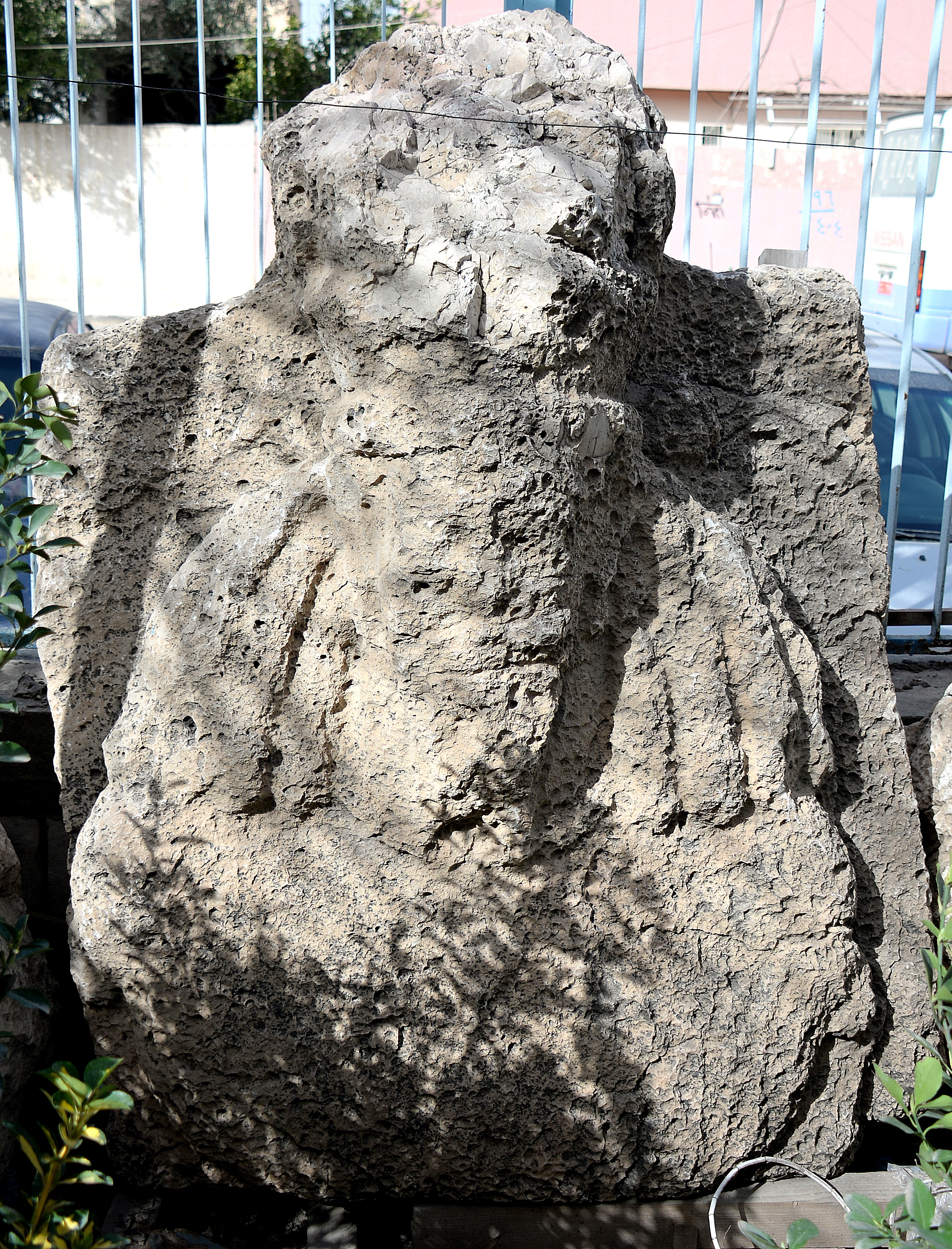
Bust of the Sasanian king Narseh, Sulaymaniyah Directorate of Antiquities
