= Bahram III =

Shahanshah of the Sasanian Empire in 293 CE

Bahram III 𐭥𐭫𐭧𐭫𐭠𐭭
- King of Kings of Iranians and non-Iranians
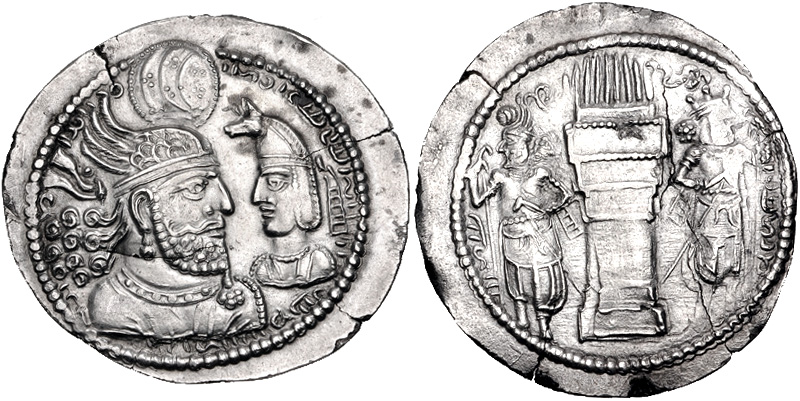
- Drachma of Bahram III as a prince with his father Bahram II, minted at Balkh

Shahanshah of the Sasanian Empire
- Reign: 293
- Predecessor: Bahram II
- Successor: Narseh

Governor of Sakastan
- Reign: 283–293
- Predecessor: Hormizd of Sakastan
- Successor: Unknown
- House: House of Sasan
- Father: Bahram II
- Mother: Shapurdukhtak
- Religion: Zoroastrianism

Bahram III (also spelled Wahram III or Warahran III; Middle Persian: 𐭥𐭫𐭧𐭫𐭠𐭭, New Persian: بهرام سوم), was the sixth king of kings (shah) of the Sasanian Empire. He was son and successor of Bahram II. Prior to becoming king he was the viceroy of Sakastan, which had been re-conquered by his father sometime in the 280s.

Bahram III ascended to the throne after his father's death in 293. Many nobles considered him too weak to rule, instead pledging allegiance to his grand-uncle Narseh. After reigning for a period of only four months, Bahram III was either captured or more likely killed during a campaign by Narseh, who took his place as king.

== Name ==
His theophoric name "Bahram" is the New Persian form of the Middle Persian Warahrān (also spelled Wahrām), which is derived from the Old Iranian Vṛθragna. The Avestan equivalent was Verethragna, the name of the old Iranian god of victory, whilst the Parthian version was *Warθagn. The name is transliterated in Greek as Baranes, whilst the Armenian transliteration is Vahagn/Vrām. The name is attested in Georgian as Baram and Latin as Vararanes.

== Biography ==
In Sasanian Iran, it was customary for kings after conquering a land or people, to give their sons titles showing domination over them. Bahram III gained his title of "sākān shāh" presumably after his father's victory over the Sakastan (present day Sistan) region. Also following early Sasanian practices of giving appanage of provinces to princes, Bahram III was appointed to Sakastan, a region of strategic importance in defending the eastern extremes of the kingdom.

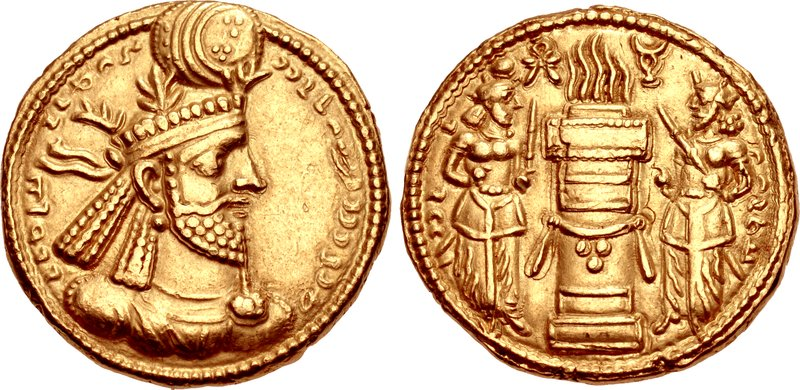
Gold dinar of Narseh.

Following the death of Bahram II in 293, Bahram III was proclaimed king in Pars by a group of nobles led by Wahnam and supported by Adurfarrobay, King of Meshan. He was still a minor at the time of his ascension, and many nobles (outside his core group of supporters) considered him too weak to properly handle the threat posed by the Romans and the possibility of invasion. They decided to challenge his succession to the throne and instead pledged allegiance to Narseh, the last remaining son of Shapur I, perceived as being a stronger leader and better able to bring glory to Iran.

Four months into Bahram's reign, his grand-uncle Narseh was summoned to Mesopotamia at the request of many members of the Iranian nobility. He met them in the passage of Paikuli in the province of Garmekan, where he was firmly approved and likely also declared shah for the first time. The reasons behind the nobles favour of Narseh might have been due to his jurisdiction as governor, his image as an advocate of the Zoroastrian religion and as an insurer for harmony and prosperity of the empire. His ancestry from the early Sasanian family probably also played a role.

In order to avoid bloodshed, Narseh proposed to make peace with both Bahram III and Wahnam. Both seem to have agreed, as no accounts of battles have been made. The reason behind Bahram and Wahnam's quick agreement to peace may have been due to desertion amongst many of Bahram's men. Bahram abdicated as shah and was probably spared, whilst Wahnam was executed when Narseh entered the Sasanian capital of Ctesiphon. Narseh then summoned the aristocrats to take part in the royal referendum, a ritual which had been used since the first Sasanian shah, Ardashir I (r. 224–242), and which Narseh now made use of in order to gain the approval of the aristocracy as a legitimate ruler instead that of a usurper. Narseh was decisively voted in favour by the majority, and guaranteed "to enter the throne of our father and our forefathers with the help of the Gods, in their name and that of our forefathers."

== Artifacts ==
Many coins that could be attributed to him are small in number and due to uncertainty, many are often attributed to Narseh. Because many of the coins are attributed to him are smoother than usual the details of his crown are faint. It is believed that he is depicted wearing a gold crown with a crenellated lower rim and two large deer horns or at least replicas of them attached on each side. The Sasani sphere sits between the horns on the front of the crown.

A low relief at the Bishapur archeological site depicts a figure being trampled by a horse. It is assumed that this scene is a representation of either the death of Bahram III or more likely his ally Wahnam.

== Sources ==
- Bosworth, Clifford (1999). The Sāsānids, the Byzantines, the Lakhmids, and Yemen. Albany: SUNY Press. ISBN 0-7914-4355-8.
- Yarshater, Ehsan (1968). The Cambridge History of Iran. Cambridge: Cambridge University Press. ISBN 0-511-46774-5.
- Ayatollahi, Habibollah (2003). The Book of Iran: The History of Iranian Art. City: Center for International-Cultural Studies. ISBN 964-94491-4-0.
- Baker, Patricia L. (2005). Iran, 2nd: the Bradt Travel Guide. City: Bradt Travel Guides. ISBN 1-84162-123-4.
- Henning, Walter Bruno (1974). Acta Iranica. Téhéran: Bibliothèque Pahlavi. ISBN 90-04-03902-3.
- Neusner, Jacob (1997). A History of the Jews in Babylonia: from Shapur I to Shapur II. Boston: Brill Academic Publishers. ISBN 90-04-02144-2.
- Klíma, O. (1988). "Bahrām III". Encyclopaedia Iranica, Vol. III, Fasc. 5. pp. 514–522.
- Weber, Ursula (2016). "Narseh". Encyclopaedia Iranica.
- Kia, Mehrdad (2016). The Persian Empire: A Historical Encyclopedia [2 volumes]: A Historical Encyclopedia. ABC-CLIO. ISBN 978-1610693912.
- Martindale, John R.; Jones, A. H. M.; Morris, John, eds. (1971). The Prosopography of the Later Roman Empire: Volume I, AD 260–395. Cambridge: Cambridge University Press. ISBN 0-521-07233-6.
- Rapp, Stephen H. (2014). The Sasanian World through Georgian Eyes: Caucasia and the Iranian Commonwealth in Late Antique Georgian Literature. Ashgate Publishing, Ltd. ISBN 978-1472425522.
- Multiple authors (1988). "Bahrām". Encyclopaedia Iranica, Vol. III, Fasc. 5. pp. 514–522.
- Wiesehöfer, Josef (2018). "Bahram I". In Nicholson, Oliver (ed.). The Oxford Dictionary of Late Antiquity. Oxford: Oxford University Press. ISBN 978-0-19-866277-8.

Bahram III Sasanian dynasty
Preceded by Bahram II	King of Kings of Iran and non-Iran; 293	Succeeded by Narseh
