= Narseh =

Shahanshah of the Sasanian Empire from 293 to 303

Narseh 𐭭𐭥𐭮𐭧𐭩
- King of Kings of Iranians and non-Iranians
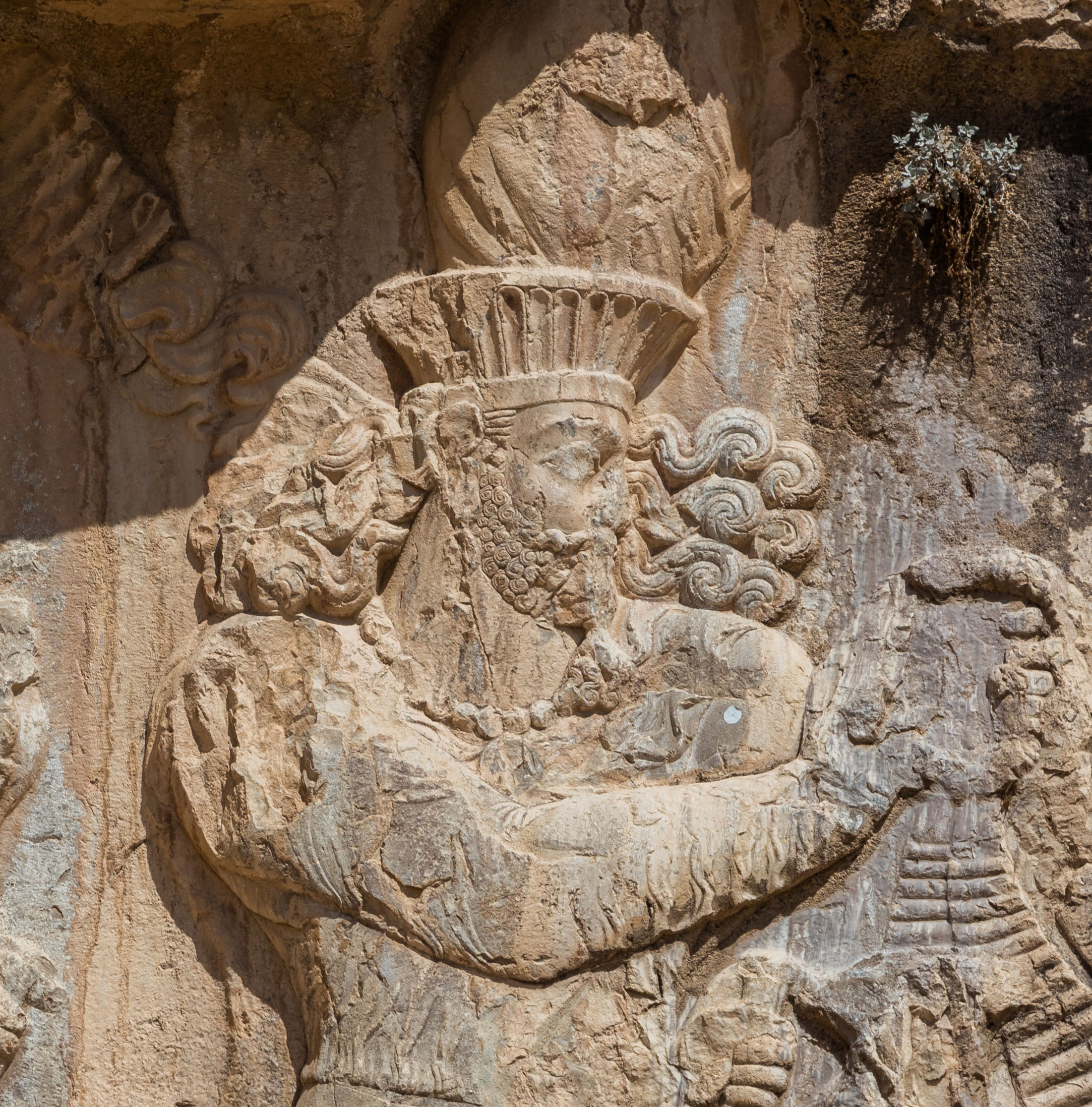
- Rock relief of Narseh in Naqsh-e Rostam

King of Armenia
- Reign: 271 – 293
- Predecessor: Hormizd I

Shahanshah of the Sasanian Empire
- Reign: 293 – 303
- Predecessor: Bahram III
- Successor: Hormizd II
- Born: Between 228–233
- Died: 303 (aged 70–75)
- Spouse: Shapurdukhtak
- Issue: Hormizd II; Hormizddukhtak
- House: House of Sasan
- Father: Shapur I
- Religion: Zoroastrianism

Narseh (also spelled Narses or Narseus; Middle Persian: 𐭭𐭥𐭮𐭧𐭩) was the seventh King of Kings of Sasanian Iran from 293 to 303. The youngest son of Shapur I (r. 240–270), Narseh served as the governor of Sakastan, Hind and Turan under his father. Shapur I was eventually succeeded by his son Hormizd I (r. 270–271), who died after a reign of one year. Shapur I's eldest son Bahram I, who had never been considered as a candidate for succession to the throne by his father, ascended the throne with the aid of the powerful Zoroastrian priest Kartir. He then made a settlement with Narseh to give up his entitlement to the throne in return for the governorship of the important frontier province of Armenia, which was a persistent cause for war between the Roman and Sasanian Empires. Narseh held the title of "Great King of Armenia" (Wuzurg Šāh Arminān), which was used by the heir to the throne in the early Sasanian times. Nevertheless, Narseh most likely still viewed Bahram I as a usurper.

The succession of Bahram I's son, Bahram II (r. 274–293) seemingly occurred without any issues. After Bahram II's death in 293, his son Bahram III was unwillingly crowned by a nobleman named Wahnam. The rest of the nobility did not support Bahram III's kingship, and asked Narseh to rule instead. Ultimately, Bahram III abdicated as shah, while Wahnam was executed. Narseh was the first Sasanian ruler to not ascend the throne as a crown prince. The circumstances of his rise to power are detailed in the Paikuli inscription, which he made as his own Res Gestae Divi Augusti and to legitimize his rule.

Three years after Narseh's accession, war erupted between the Sasanians and Romans once again. In 296 or 297, Narseh's forces inflicted a defeat on the forces of Galerius at the Battle of Carrhae. The following year, however, Narseh suffered a major defeat at Satala; his wives, children, and many Iranian nobles were taken as prisoners of war. Due to this ignominious defeat, Narseh was forced to accept a peace treaty prescribed by the Romans, ceding them several areas at the Sasanian-Roman border.

Narseh appears to have returned to the policy of religious tolerance of his father.

== Name ==
The name of Narseh stems from the Old Iranian theophoric name of *naryasa(n)ha-, meaning "men's praise". Narseh's name is listed as nrshy in Middle Persian and nryshw in Parthian on the Paikuli inscription and Naqsh-e Rostam. The Greek version of his name is also listed in the inscriptions, as Narsaiēs or Narsaios. However, other Greek sources generally spell his name as Narsēs. The name of Narseh is known in other languages as; Latin: Narseus; Syriac ܢܪܣܝ Nrsy; Arabic: نرسي Narsi; Armenian Nerseh; Coptic Narsaph, as well as Narseos.

== Early life and governorship ==
Narseh seems to have been the youngest son of Shapur I, being born between 228 and 233 during the reign of his grandfather Ardashir I (r. 224–242). Narseh is quoted in an inscription by his father Shapur I as the governor of the eastern Sasanian provinces of Hind, Sakastan and Turan. During his term as governor, he reportedly played an important role in the affairs of the eastern portion of the empire. Shapur I died in 270, and was succeeded by Hormizd I, whose rule only lasted one year due to death. Narseh's older brother Bahram I, who was never considered a candidate for succession of the throne by their father, probably due to having a mother of lowly origin, ascended the throne with the aid of the powerful Zoroastrian priest Kartir.

He then made a settlement with Narseh to give up his entitlement to the throne in return for the governorship of the important frontier province of Armenia, which was constantly the source of war between the Roman and Sasanian Empires. Narseh held the title of Wuzurg Šāh Arminān ("Great King of Armenia"), which was used by the heir to the throne. (Note: In the Paikuli inscription, Narseh uses the title Armenān Šāh 'King of the Armenians', whereas in Shapur I's inscription on the Ka'ba-ye Zartosht Hormizd I is described as the Wuzurg Armenān Šāh 'Great King of the Armenians'; this may simply be because of the context of the Paikuli inscription, in which Narseh is already King of Kings and is probably referring to his former title of King of the Armenians.) Nevertheless, Narseh still most likely viewed Bahram I as a usurper. Bahram I's reign however, lasted shortly, ending on September 274 with his death. His son Bahram II succeeded him as shah, seemingly without any issues; he may have been aided by Kartir to ascend the throne over Narseh. This most likely frustrated Narseh, who had now been neglected from succession several times.

== Rise ==
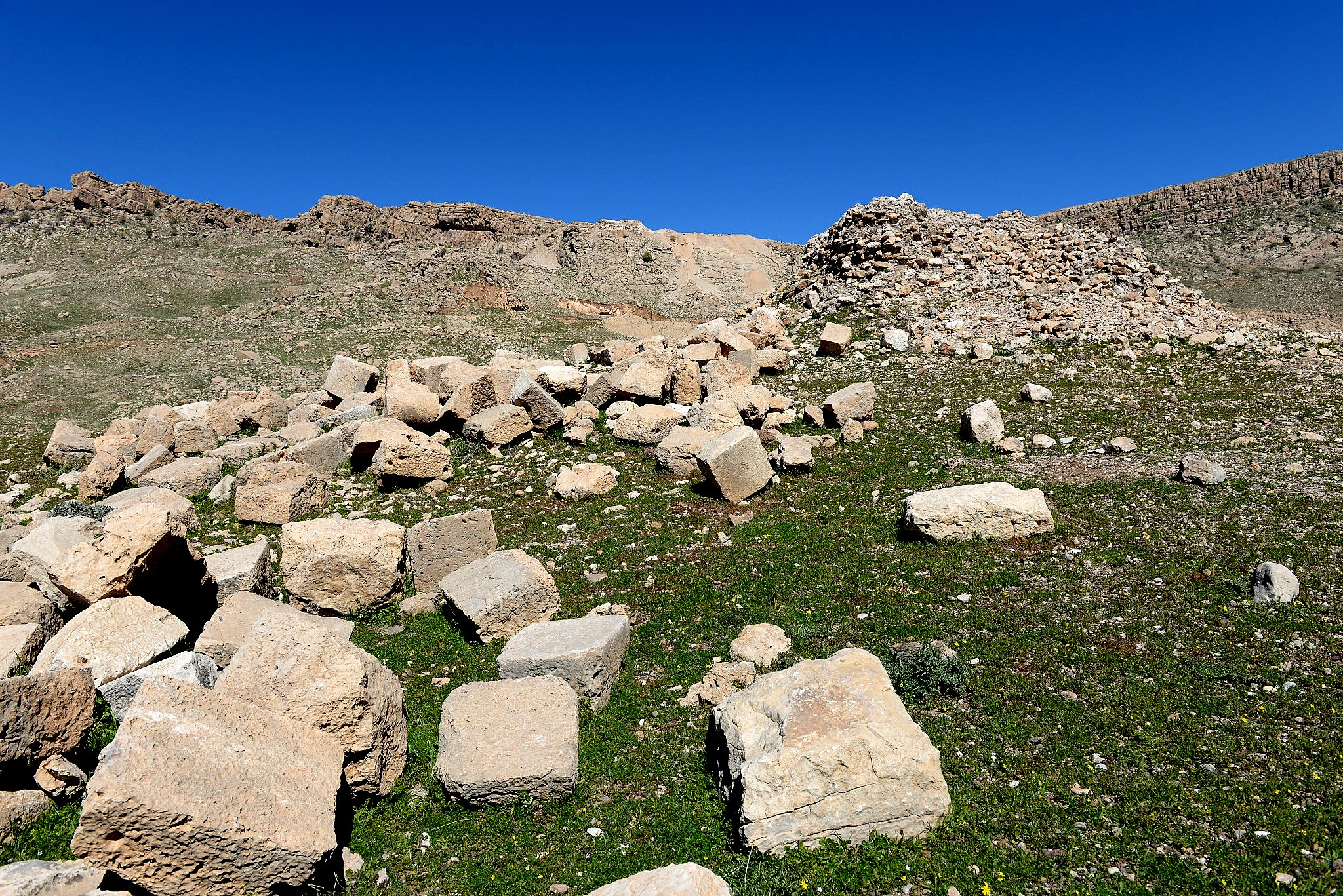
Ruins of the Paikuli tower in present-day Iraqi Kurdistan.

Following the death of Bahram II in 293, his son Bahram III was unwillingly proclaimed shah in Pars by a group of nobles led by Wahnam and supported by Adurfarrobay, governor of Meshan. However, Bahram III was considered a weak ruler by the other nobles, who decided to pledge allegiance to Narseh, the last remaining son of Shapur, and someone who was perceived as being a stronger leader and one who would be able to bring glory to Iran. Four months into Bahram III's reign, Narseh was summoned to Mesopotamia at the request of many members of the Iranian nobility. He met them in the passage of Paikuli in the province of Garmekan, where he was firmly approved and likely also declared shah for the first time. The reasons behind the nobles favour of Narseh might have been due to his jurisdiction as governor, his image as an advocate of the Zoroastrian religion in which he held the religion to the highest standard in Sasanian society, and as an insurer for harmony and prosperity of the empire. His ancestry from the early Sasanian family probably also played a role.

In order to avoid bloodshed, Narseh proposed to make peace with both Bahram III and Wahnam. Both seem to have agreed, as no accounts of battles have been made. The reason behind Bahram III and Wahnam's quick agreement to peace may have been due to desertion amongst many of Bahram III's men. Bahram III abdicated as shah and was probably spared, whilst Wahnam was executed when Narseh entered the Sasanian capital of Ctesiphon. Narseh then summoned the aristocrats to take part in the royal referendum, a ritual which had been used since the first Sasanian shah, Ardashir I (r. 224–242), and which Narseh now made use of in order to gain the approval of the aristocracy as a legitimate ruler instead that of a usurper. Narseh was decisively voted in favour by the majority, and guaranteed "to enter the throne of our father and our forefathers with the help of the Gods, in their name and that of our forefathers." Amongst those nobles who supported Narseh was the leading priest Kartir, which is attested in the Paikuli inscription.

== Reign ==
=== War with the Romans ===
==== Background ====
Map showing the Roman-Sasanian borders.

When Narseh ascended the throne, the eastern portion of Mesopotamia (since 244) and all of Armenia (since 252) were under Iranian rule. The notion that the western part of Armenia had been given to the Arsacid prince Tiridates III has been questioned. (Note: The confusion on this question arises from the mention of a King "Tirdad" in Nerseh's Paikuli inscription. This "Tirdad" is often identified with Tiridates III, who ruled in Armenia after the end of Sasanian rule there and converted to Christianity. Historian Cyril Toumanoff argues that "Tirdad" refers to that Tiridates' uncle, also named Tiridates, who according to Toumanoff's reconstruction ruled over a western, Roman-controlled portion of Armenia after murdering his brother Khosrov II (father of Tiridates the Great, who is Tiridates IV, not III, by Toumanoff's count). Carlo Cereti, following Erich Kettenhofen, writes that there is insufficient evidence to positively identify the "Tirdad" of the Paikuli inscription with any known figure.) According to historian Ursula Weber, "It is quite certain" that the whole of Armenia continued to be a part of the Sasanian Empire in the 3rd century, until it was later ceded to the Romans in 298/9 after the Peace of Nisibis. The proposition of Narseh presumably following Shapur I's expansionistic approach does not match with his testimony in the Paikuli inscription; "And Caesar and the Romans were in gratitude (?) and peace and friendship with us." Contrary to the testimony, however, the two empires soon clashed with each other−in 296. From a Roman viewpoint, the mutual relations with Iran had been heavily strained due to the aggressive and expansionistic approach of Ardashir I and Shapur I. However, the conclusive causes for the Roman offensive was possibly due to their territorial losses and the disadvantageous change in the sphere of authority and influence in the Mesopotamian-Armenian lands in the 240s and 250s.

==== The war ====
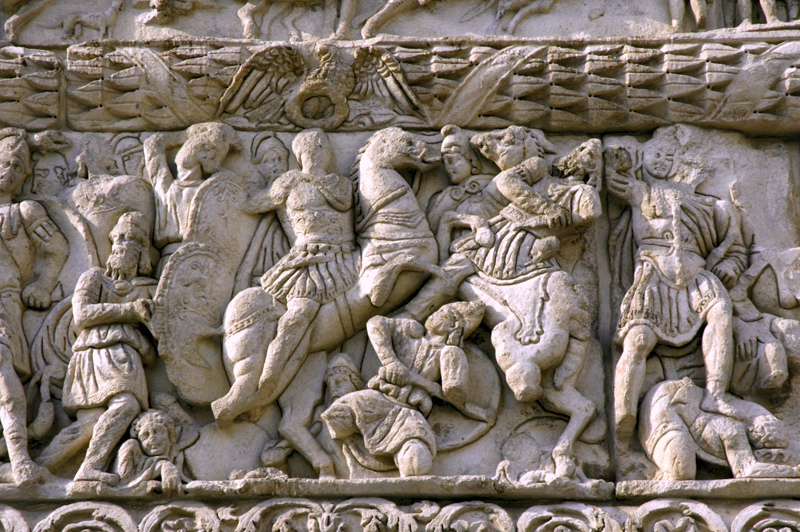
Detail of Galerius attacking Narseh on the Arch of Galerius at Thessaloniki, Greece.

Galerius, Caesar under Emperor Diocletian, invaded Mesopotamia, which Narseh had occupied hoping to check his advance. Three battles were fought subsequently, the first two of which were indecisive. In the third fought at Callinicum, Galerius suffered a complete defeat and was forced to retreat. Galerius crossed the Euphrates into Syria to join his father-in-law Diocletian at Antioch. On his arrival at Antioch, Galerius was rebuked by Diocletian who disgraced him for his shameful defeat at the hands of Narseh. Vowing to take revenge, Galerius made preparations throughout the winter of 297 and invaded Armenia with 25,000 men.

Supported by the Armenians, Galerius surprised Narseh in his camp at the Battle of Satala and inflicted a crushing defeat on the latter, forcing him to flee in haste. His wife, prisoners, his sisters and a number of his children were captured apart from his prodigious military chest. Eastern Mesopotamia was recovered by the Romans and Tiridates was reinstated as the monarch of Armenia.

==== Peace negotiations ====
Anxious to make peace with the Romans, Narseh dispatched his envoy Aphraban to Galerius with the following message:

The whole human race knows that the Roman and Persian kingdoms resemble two great luminaries, and that, like a man's two eyes, they ought mutually to adorn and illustrate each other, and not in the extremity of their wrath to seek rather each other's destruction. So to act is not to act manfully, but is indicative rather of levity and weakness; for it is to suppose that our inferiors can never be of any service to us, and that therefore we had better get rid of them. Narseh, moreover, ought not to be accounted a weaker prince than other Persian kings; thou hast indeed conquered him, but then thou surpassest all other monarchs; and thus Narseh has of course been worsted by thee, though he is no whit inferior in merit to the best of his ancestors. The orders which my master has given me are to entrust all the rights of Persia to the clemency of Rome; and I therefore do not even bring with me any conditions of peace, since it is for the emperor to determine everything. I have only to pray, on my master's behalf, for the restoration of his wives and male children; if he receives them at your hands, he will be forever beholden to you, and will be better pleased than if he recovered them by force of arms. Even now my master cannot sufficiently thank you for the kind treatment which he hears you have vouchsafed them, in that you have offered them no insult, but have behaved towards them as though on the point of giving them back to their kith and kin. He sees herein that you bear in mind the changes of fortune and the instability of all human affairs.

But Galerius dismissed Aphraban without giving any definite answer, at the same time accusing the Iranians of ill-treating Valerian. In the meantime, he consulted Diocletian at Nisibis, and he persuaded Galerius to offer terms of peace to the Iranians. Accordingly, terms of peace were agreed upon, and were ratified by a treaty concluded by Narseh with the Romans.

According to this treaty,

- Five provinces beyond the Tigris were to be ceded to the Romans. One writer gives these provinces as Ingilene, Sophene, Arzanene, Corduene, and Zabdicene; by another as Arzanene, Moxoene, Zabdicene, Rehimene, and Corduene.
- The semi-independent kingdom of Armenia was to be extended up to the fortress of Zintha, in Media.
- Iran was expected to relinquish all her rights over Iberia.
- Formal dealings between Iran and Rome would henceforth be conducted at Nisibis.

Narseh did not survive for long after the conclusion of this humiliating treaty. He died in 303 and was succeeded by his son, Hormizd II.

== Religious policy ==
Narseh appears to have returned to the policy of religious tolerance of his father. The Chronicle of Seert, a later source written by a Christian of the Church of the East, depicts him as tolerant of Christianity. He also put an end to the persecution of Manichaeans, though probably not immediately upon taking the throne. At the same time, he made his religious views clear in the Paikuli inscription. As Ursula Weber writes, "It must have been Narseh's intent to demonstrate the close connection between the legitimization of his rule and the rule of his Sasanian forefathers and the favor of the Zoroastrian gods both to his followers and to future generations". As with other Sasanian kings, Narseh was believed by his followers to possess the xwarrah, the divine glory of kings, which meant that he was selected and protected by the gods. He emphasized the primacy of Ahura Mazda (Ohrmazd) among the gods, whereas his father Shapur I referred to "the gods" in general. The goddess Anahita (Anahid) also features prominently in the Paikuli inscription. According to Cereti and Terribili, the Paikuli monument itself was titled Pērōz-Anāhīd-Narseh, glossed as "Narseh victorious by the grace of Anahid". Narseh might have had a special interest in her cult. Originally, the Sasanian dynasts had been caretakers of the temple of Anahita in Istakhr, but under Bahram II authority over the temple was granted to the high priest Kartir. The depiction of Anahita in Narseh's rock relief at Naqsh-e Rostam (although this identification is disputed; see below) has been taken as evidence of a "religio-political shake-up" in the empire. Historian Touraj Daryaee suggests that Narseh may have taken back control of the temple of Anahita and focused his worship on her at the expense of Kartir's influence, although he does not rule out that the cult of Anahita never lapsed in the first place. Kartir's period of influence was temporary, and in Narseh's inscription he is called simply "Kirdēr the Mowbed of Ohrmazd", as opposed to the more elaborate titles he held under Narseh's predecessors.

== Coinage ==
The title of Narseh on his coins was the typical Mazdēsn bay Narsē šāhān šāh Ērān ud Anērān kēčihr az yazdān ("the Mazda-worshiping, divine Narseh, King of Kings of Iran(ians) and non-Iran(ians), whose image/brilliance is from the gods"). The iconography of Narseh's coins can be categorized into three phases. The first and second phases portray him wearing a palmette crown, albeit with two different hairstyles. In the third phase, he is wearing a lamellar crown along with a different hairstyle.

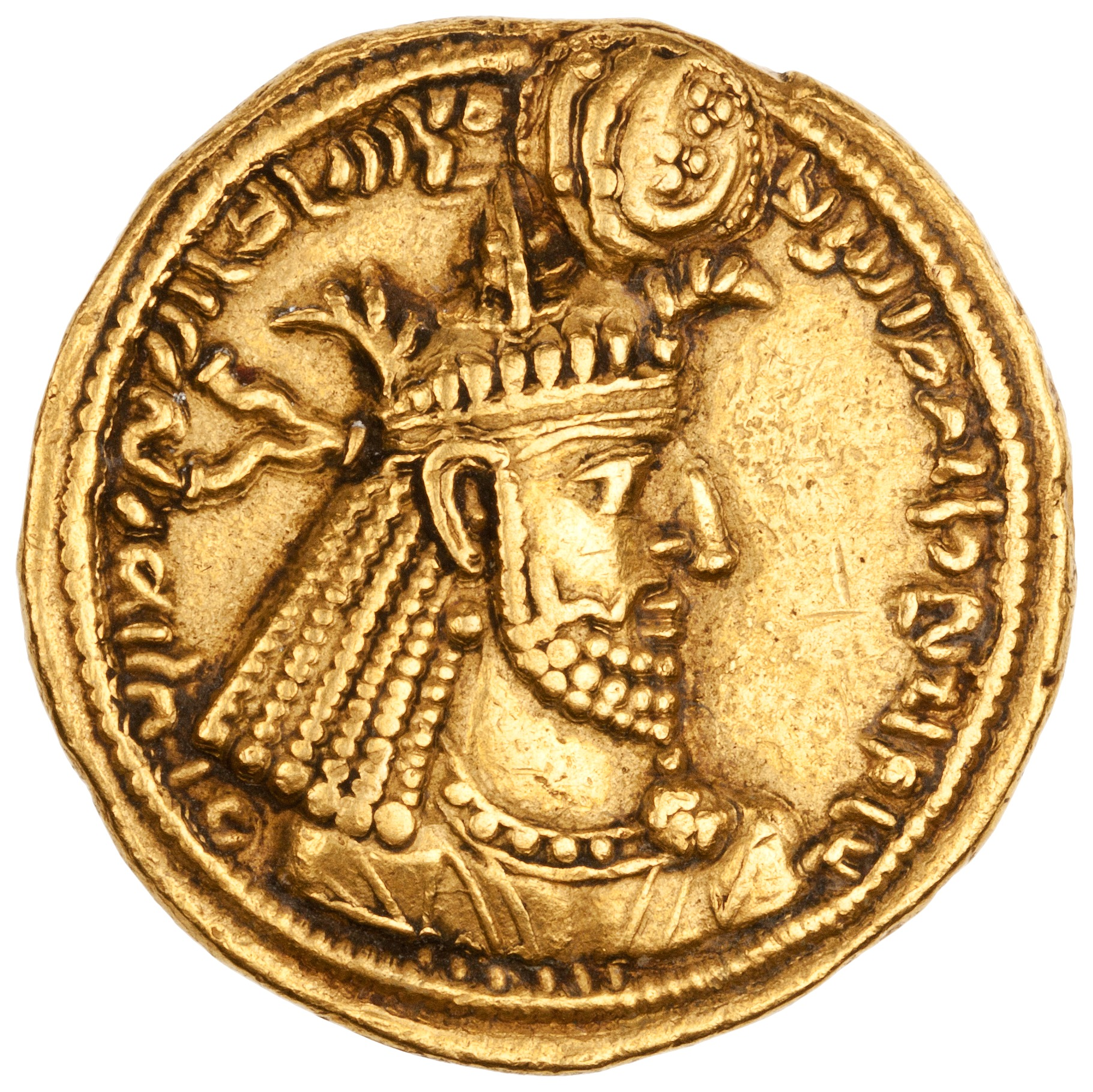
Gold dinar of Narseh, phase 1.

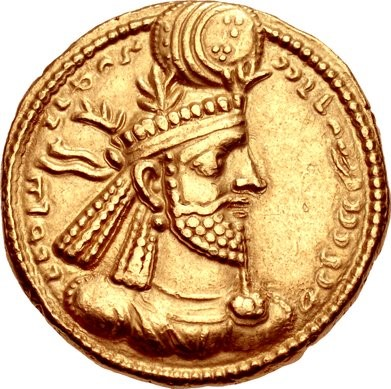
Gold dinar of Narseh, phase 2.

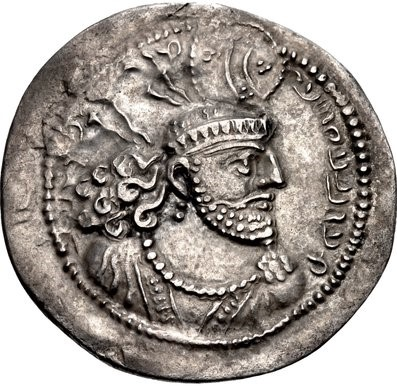
Drachma of Narseh, phase 3.

== The Paikuli inscription ==
The Paikuli inscription in present-day Iraqi Kurdistan is the only source that describes the reign of Bahram III and the rise of Narseh to the throne. Unlike Shapur I's inscription at the Ka'ba-ye Zartosht, the Paikuli inscription omits the use of Greek, but still uses Parthian and Middle Persian. This, however, marks the last time that Parthian is used in Sasanian royal records. The inscription, along with Shapur I's inscription, demonstrates that the organization of the early Sasanian Empire did not contrast much to its predecessor, the Parthian Empire. Like the Parthian monarch, the Sasanian monarch used the title of Shahanshah ("King of Kings"), ruling as the overlord of other lesser kings, such as the king of Adiabene.

== Rock relief ==
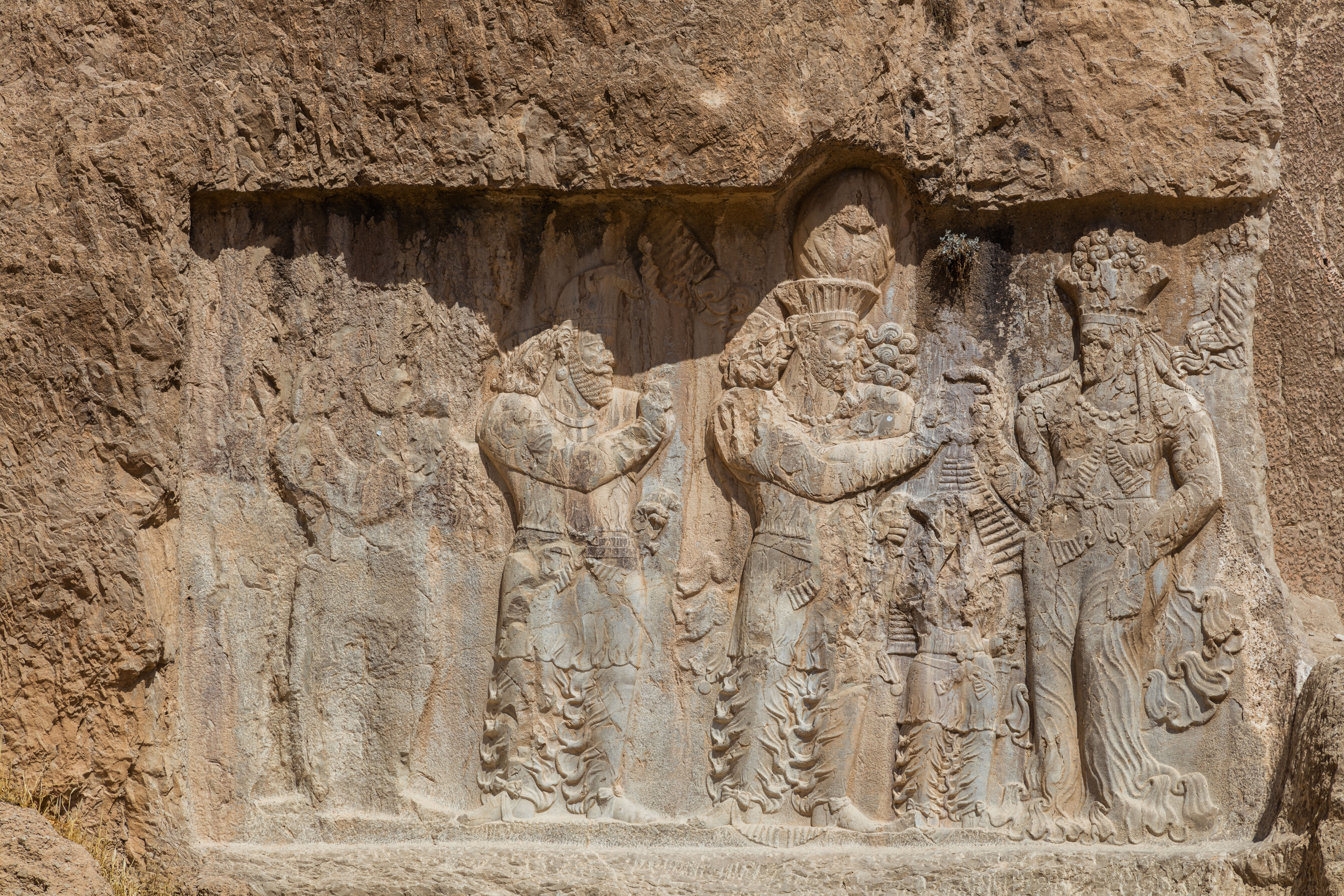
The Naqsh-e Rostam relief of Narseh, receiving the ring of kingship from a female figure, either the goddess Anahita or his queen Shapurdukhtak. The figure standing behind Narseh is most likely his son and heir, Hormizd.

While ruling as king of Iran, Narseh had a rock relief carved at Naqsh-e Rostam, between the burial site of the Achaemenid kings Darius the Great (r. 522 – 486 BC) and Xerxes I (r. 486 – 465 BC). The relief depicts an investiture scene, with Narseh, wearing a lamellar crown, surrounded by his family. Narseh is receiving the ring of kingship from a female figure that is frequently assumed to be the goddess Anahita. However, some scholars have suggested that this might be his queen, Shapurdukhtak. The figure standing behind Narseh is most likely the crown prince Hormizd, due to his cap being the form of that of an animal protome, which was typically worn by Sasanian heirs.

== Titles ==
Throughout his lifetime, Narseh is known to have had several titles, attested in contemporary chronicles, four inscriptions (ŠKZ, NVŠ, NPi, ŠṬBn-I) and his coins.

- As governor of Hind, Sakastan and Turan; ēr mazdēsn Narseh, šāh Hind, Sagestān ud Turestān tā drayā damb ("the Iranian, Mazda-worshipping Narseh, king of Hind(estan), Sagestan and Turan up to the seacoast").
- As governor of Armenia: šāh Armenān ("King of Armenia").
- During his rule as king of Iran, he assumed the titles of his predecessors: ptkly ZNH mzdysn bgy nlsḥy MLKʾn MLKʾ ʾyrʾn W ʾnyrʾn MNW ctry MN yzdʾn, "This (is) the image of the Mazda-worshipping god Narseh, king of kings of Eran and Aneran, whose seed (is) from the gods" in the inscription of his brother, Bahram I, which he had altered.
- The title of Narseh ī Abzūdxwarrah ("Narseh, whose xwarrah blossoms"), which Narseh had most likely received by his supporters at the gathering at Paikuli.

== Sources ==
- Brosius, Maria (1 January 2000). "Women i. In Pre-Islamic Persia". In Yarshater, Ehsan (ed.). Encyclopædia Iranica (Online ed.). Encyclopædia Iranica Foundation.
- Canepa, Matthew P. (2018). The Iranian Expanse: Transforming Royal Identity through Architecture, Landscape, and the Built Environment, 550 BCE–642 CE. University of California Press. pp. 1–512. ISBN 9780520964365.
- Cereti, Carlo G. (2021). "Narseh, Armenia, and the Paikuli Inscription". Electrum. 28: 69–87. doi:10.4467/20800909EL.21.007.13365. hdl:11573/1560101. S2CID 243513056.
- Cereti, Carlo G.; Terribili, Gianfilippo (2014). "The Middle Persian and Parthian Inscriptions on the Paikuli Tower". Iranica Antiqua. XLIX: 347–382. doi:10.2143/IA.49.0.3009246. ISSN 1783-1482.
- Daryaee, Touraj (2014). Sasanian Persia: The Rise and Fall of an Empire. I.B.Tauris. pp. 1–240. ISBN 978-0857716668.
- Daryaee, Touraj; Rezakhani, Khodadad (2016). From Oxus to Euphrates: The World of Late Antique Iran. H&S Media. pp. 1–126. ISBN 9781780835778.
- Shahbazi, A. Shapur (1988). "Bahrām II". In Yarshater, Ehsan (ed.). Encyclopædia Iranica. Vol. III/5: Bahai Faith III–Baḵtīārī tribe II (Online ed.). Encyclopædia Iranica Foundation. pp. 514–522.
- Shahbazi, A. Shapur (20 July 2005). "Sasanian dynasty". In Yarshater, Ehsan (ed.). Encyclopædia Iranica (Online ed.). Encyclopædia Iranica Foundation.
- Klíma, O. (1988). "Bahrām III". In Yarshater, Ehsan (ed.). Encyclopædia Iranica. Vol. III/5: Bahai Faith III–Baḵtīārī tribe II (Online ed.). Encyclopædia Iranica Foundation. pp. 514–522.
- Kia, Mehrdad (2016). The Persian Empire: A Historical Encyclopedia [2 volumes]: A Historical Encyclopedia. ABC-CLIO. ISBN 978-1610693912.
- Marciak, Michał (2017). Sophene, Gordyene, and Adiabene: Three Regna Minora of Northern Mesopotamia Between East and West. BRILL. ISBN 9789004350724.
- Schindel, Nikolaus (2013). "Sasanian Coinage". In Potts, Daniel T. (ed.). The Oxford Handbook of Ancient Iran. Oxford University Press. ISBN 978-0199733309.
- Shahbazi, A. Shapur (2004). "Hormozd II". In Yarshater, Ehsan (ed.). Encyclopædia Iranica. Vol. XII/5: Homosexuality III–Human migration II (Online ed.). Encyclopædia Iranica Foundation. pp. 464–465.
- Shayegan, M. Rahim (2013). "Sasanian Political Ideology". In Potts, Daniel T. (ed.). The Oxford Handbook of Ancient Iran. Oxford University Press. ISBN 978-0199733309.
- Skjærvø, Prods Oktor (2011). "Kartir". In Yarshater, Ehsan (ed.). Encyclopædia Iranica. Vol. XV/6: Karim Khan Zand–Kašḡari, Saʿd-al-Din (Online ed.). Encyclopædia Iranica Foundation. pp. 608–628.
- Toumanoff, Cyril (1969). "The Third-Century Armenian Arsacids: A Chronological and Genealogical Commentary". Revue des études arméniennes. 6: 233–281.
- Weber, Ursula (2012). "Narseh, König der Könige von Ērān und Anērān". Iranica Antiqua. 47: 153–302. doi:10.2143/IA.47.0.2141965.
- Weber, Ursula (2016). "Narseh". In Yarshater, Ehsan (ed.). Encyclopædia Iranica (Online ed.). Encyclopædia Iranica Foundation. Archived from the original on 29 May 2019.
- Dmitriev, Vladimir (2020). "'Aryan Worshiping Ohrmazd': Towards the Political Biography of Shahanshah Narseh". Vestnik Drevnei Istorii. 80 (2): 434–461. doi:10.31857/S032103910008630-6. S2CID 240767593.

Narseh Sasanian dynasty Died: 303
Preceded by Bahram III	King of Kings of Iran and non-Iran; 293–303	Succeeded by Hormizd II
