= Meshan =

Province of the Sasanian Empire

- Province of the Sassanian Empire
- 224–637
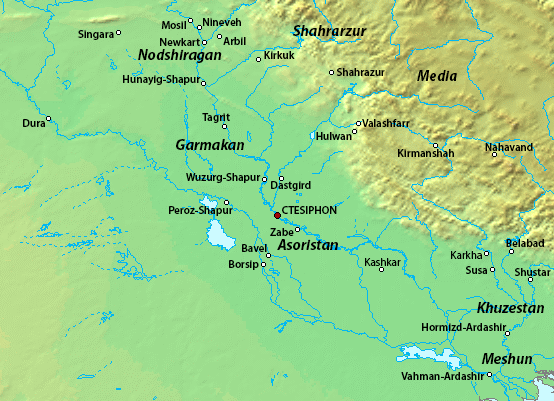
- Map of Meshan and its surrounding provinces
- Capital: Karkh Meshan (224–410); Vahman-Ardashir (410–637)
- Historical era: Late Antiquity
  - Sasanian conquest: 224
  - Rashidun conquest: 637
Preceded by	Succeeded by
Characene	Rashidun Caliphate
- Today part of: Iraq; Kuwait

Meshan (Middle Persian: 𐭬𐭩𐭱𐭠𐭭) was a province of the Sasanian Empire. It consisted of the Parthian vassal kingdom of Characene and reached north along the Shatt al-Arab river and then the lower Tigris to Madhar and possibly further. Its inhabitants were primarily Babylonians and Arabs, with minorities of Iranians and even some Indians and Malays (the Malays may have been slaves brought from the Indian sub-continent). The province was very fertile, the best place for barley according to Strabo, and contained many date palms. It was also an important trading province along the Persian Gulf.

== History ==
In, the first ruler of the Sasanian dynasty, Ardashir I (r. 224–242) after having conquered his native province, Pars, invaded Meshan, killing its ruler, Bandu. Ardashir had a city named Karkh Meshan rebuilt, and had it renamed as Astarabad-Ardashir. According to a fragmentary Manichean account found in Turfan, Mihr-šāh, a brother of the Sasnian king Shapur I (r. 240–270), ruled as the vassal-king of Meshan. According to this Manichean account, Mihr-šāh was visited and converted by Mani himself – some scholars, however, doubt the accuracy of this source. Ardashir also built (or rebuilt) a town named Vahman-Ardashir, also known as Forat Meshan. A son of Shapur I, Shapur Mishanshah, is confirmed to have ruled Meshan from an unknown date until his death in 260, and was probably succeeded by his wife Denag.

According to the inscription of king Narseh (r. 293–302), known as the Paikuli inscription, Meshan was ruled by an Iranian aristocrat named Adurfarrobay, who would later rebel against Narseh and support a claimant to the Sasanian throne, Bahram III.

During the 5th century, Vahman-Ardashir had seemingly succeeded Karkh Meshan as the capital of Meshan, due to its mention as the chief city of Meshan by Syriac sources.

The port of Obolla (Apologos) was located in this province.

== Population ==
Like most of the other western Sasanian provinces such as Asoristan, Meshan was a province with various ethnic groups; The Assyrians, the Mesenian Arabs, and the nomadic Arabs, formed the Semitic population of the province along with Arab Nabataean and Palmyrene merchants. Iranians had also begun to settle in the province, along with the Zutt, who had been deported from India. Other Indian groups such as the Malays may also have been deported to Meshan, either as captives or recruited sailors.

== Sources ==
- Morony, M. (1988). "BAHMAN-ARDAŠĪR". Encyclopaedia Iranica, Vol. III, Fasc. 5. p. 494.
- Houtsma, Martijn Theodoor (1993). "The Encyclopedia of Islam, Volume 5". The Encyclopaedia of Islam, Vol. V. Brill. pp. 1–578. ISBN 90-04-09791-0.
- Bosworth, C. E. (1986). "ʿARAB i. Arabs and Iran in the pre-Islamic period". Encyclopaedia Iranica, Vol. II, Fasc. 2. pp. 201–203.
- Hansman, John (1991). "CHARACENE and CHARAX". Encyclopaedia Iranica, Vol. V, Fasc. 4. pp. 363–365.
- Fisher, William Bayne; Yarshater, Ehsan (1983). The Cambridge History of Iran: The Seleucid, Parthian and Sasanian periods. Cambridge University Press. ISBN 978-0-521-24693-4.
