= Tomb of Naqsh-e Rostam =

Shah Mosque (Persian: آرامگاه نقش رستم) may refer to:

- Tomb of Artaxerxes I, The Tomb is Artaxerxes I.
- Tomb of Darius the Great, The Tomb is Darius the Great.
- Tomb of Darius II, The Tomb is Darius II.
- Tomb of Xerxes I, The Tomb is Xerxes I.
