= Pardeh show =

A pardeh show can be considered a kind of theatre. The word comes originally from the Persian parde, which means curtain, in fact a big and large strong curtain. There is painting of a story or a history of a war or epic on this curtain in a pardeh show. To attract an audience, the actor would mix the pardeh show with theatre. The actor usually represents a pahlavan or hero or strong man. This kind of theatre was used to tell the stories of the Shahname of Ferdousi in Iran and it was also called shahname khani.

== History ==
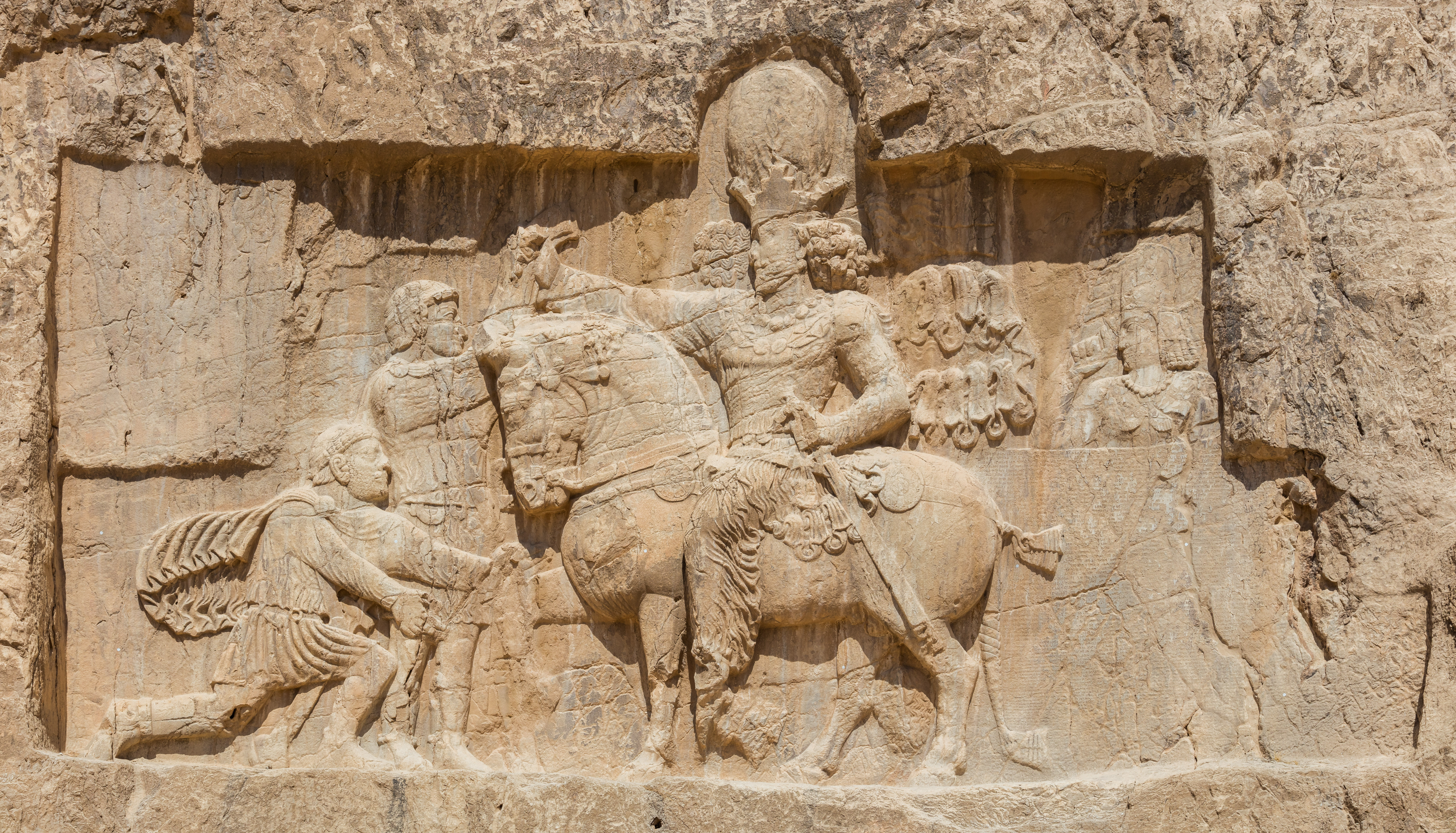
The triumph of Shapur I over the Roman Emperor Valerian, and Philip the Arab.

It dates back to the Persian empire era. The stone table of painting still can be found in Persepolis and Naqsh-e Rustam.

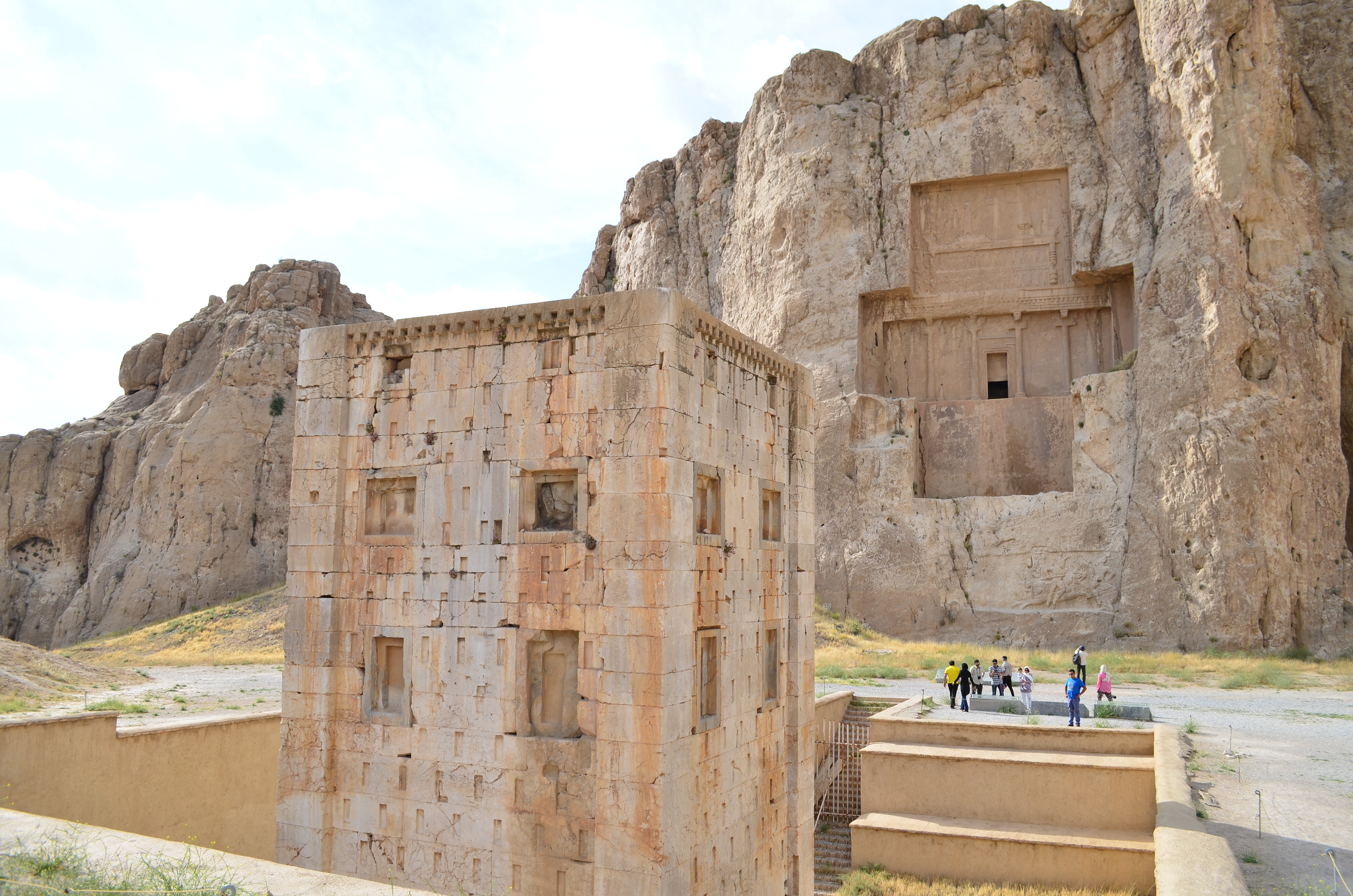
Naqsh-e Rustam

In the Middle Ages, the Persians began to use pardeh shows as a way of telling the stories from the Shahname to people who did not know how to read. They wrote mystery plays, where each part of the Shahname would be a play put on by a different group of people. They also wrote miracle plays which were plays about the lives of the heroes. There were also morality plays which taught the audiences how to live a good life. In the time of Safavid dynasty this kind of theater flourished in all parts of Iran.

=== Ancient ===
The players wore masks. Illustrations on vases show helmet-like masks, covering the entire face and head, with holes for the eyes and a small aperture for the mouth, plus a wig.

Other kinds of plays called neoclassical dramas and neoclassical comedies were also popular in Italy and in France at this time. These plays were written to copy the style of the plays from ancient Greece and Rome.
