= Naqsh-e Rostam =

Ancient necropolis in Fars province, Iran

- نقش رستم (Persian)
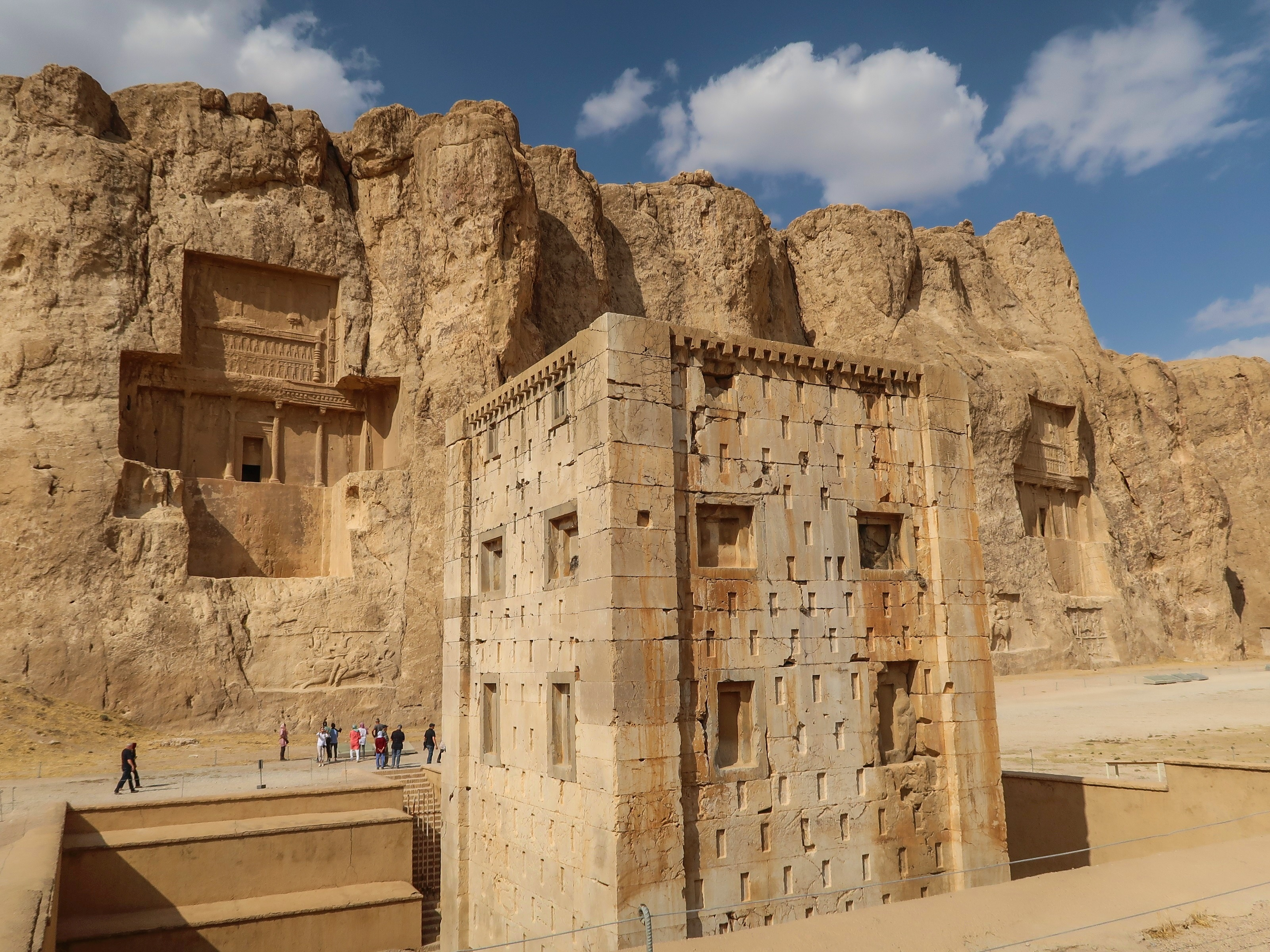
- Ka'ba-ye Zartosht in foreground, with behind the Tomb of Darius II above Sassanid equestrian relief of Bahram II.

- Location within Iran
- 29°59′20″N 52°52′29″E
- Type: Necropolis
- Periods: Achaemenian, Sassanian
- Cultures: Persian
- Location: Marvdasht, Fars province
- Region: Iran

Site notes
- Architectural style: Persian

Iran National Heritage List
- Official name: Naqsh-e Rostam
- Type: Rock tomb necropolis and bas-reliefs
- Designated: 1931
- Reference no.: 21
- Conservation organization: Cultural Heritage, Handicrafts and Tourism Organization of Iran

Naqsh-e Rostam (Persian: نقش رستم, lit. 'Mural of Rostam', Persian: [ˌnæɣʃeɾosˈtæm]) is an ancient archaeological site and necropolis located about 13 km northwest of Persepolis, in Fars province, Iran. A collection of ancient Iranian rock reliefs are cut into the face of the mountain and the mountain contains the final resting place of four Achaemenid kings, notably king Darius the Great and his son, Xerxes. This site is of great significance to the history of Iran and to Iranians, as it contains various archaeological sites carved into the rock wall through time for more than a millennium from the Elamites and Achaemenids to the Sasanians. It lies a few hundred meters from Naqsh-e Rajab, with a further four Sasanian rock reliefs, three celebrating kings and one a high priest.

Naqsh-e Rostam is the necropolis of the Achaemenid dynasty (c. 550–330 BC), with four large tombs cut high into the cliff face. These have mainly architectural decoration, but the facades include large panels over the doorways, each very similar in content, with figures of the king being invested by a god, above a zone with rows of smaller figures bearing tribute, with soldiers and officials. The three classes of figures are sharply differentiated in size. The entrance to each tomb is at the center of each cross, which opens onto a small chamber, where the king lay in a sarcophagus. The tombs were looted extensively following the conquest of Persia by Alexander the Great.

Well below the Achaemenid tombs, near ground level, are rock reliefs with large figures of Sasanian kings, some meeting gods, others in combat. The most famous shows the Sasanian king Shapur I on horseback, with the Roman Emperor Valerian bowing to him in submission, and Philip the Arab (an earlier emperor who paid Shapur tribute) holding Shapur's horse, while the dead Emperor Gordian III, killed in battle, lies beneath it (other identifications have been suggested). This commemorates the Battle of Edessa in AD 260, when Valerian became the only Roman Emperor who was captured as a prisoner of war, a lasting humiliation for the Romans. The placing of these reliefs clearly suggests the Sassanid intention to link themselves with the glories of the earlier Achaemenid Empire.

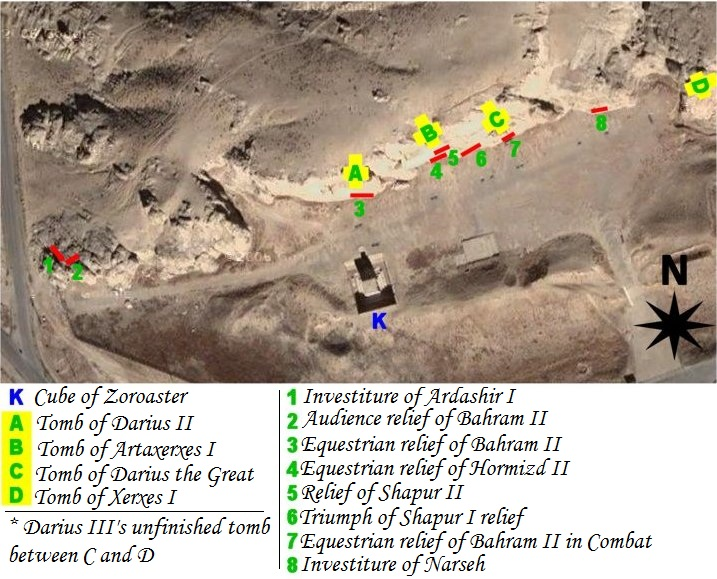
Map of the archaeological site of Naqsh-e Rostam

== Monuments ==
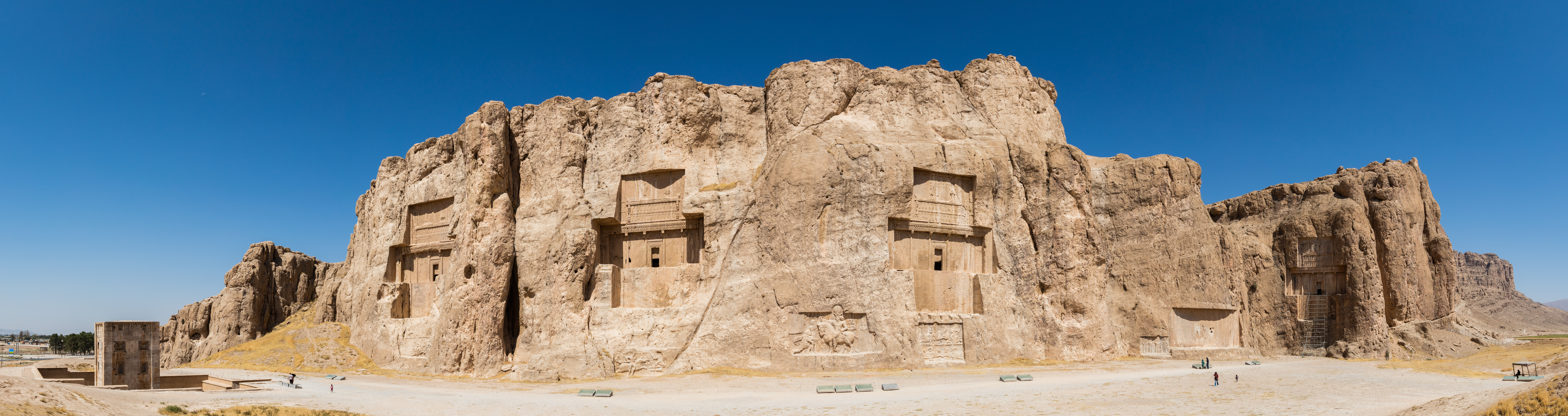
Panorama of Naqsh-e Rostam. Rock carved tombs from left to right: Darius II, Artaxerxes II, Darius the Great, Xerxes I.

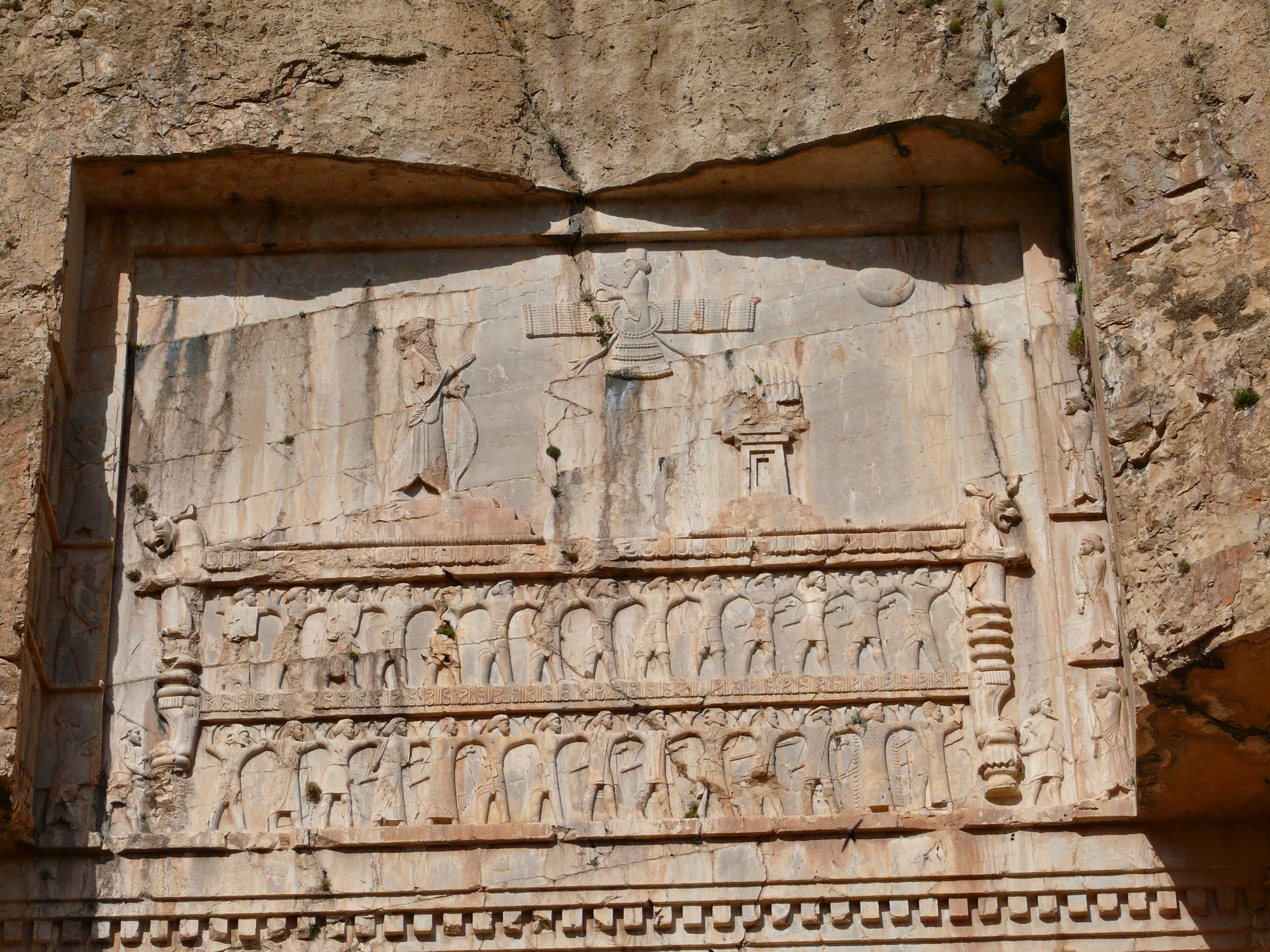
Upper register of the Achaemenid Tomb of Xerxes I

=== Elamite rock reliefs ===
The oldest relief at Naqsh-e Rostam dates back to the Elamite period, although it has been almost completely erased. Originally occupying a space 7 by 2.5 meters in area, the relief was carved over in the Sasanian period to create the 'grandee' or 'audience' relief of Bahram II, leaving only faint traces of the pre-existing Elamite composition. One figure from the pre-existing relief, likely a king of the Neo-Elamite period, was integrated into the newer Sasanian composition, appearing on the far right-hand side of the relief alongside later depictions of Sasanian officials. To the left of the preserved figure, beneath the busts of the Sasanian officials, are two partially-preserved figures sitting on thrones of coiled snakes, and on the far left side of the relief is the preserved head of a female figure wearing a mural crown.

Though it is severely damaged, another relief near the investiture scene of Narseh, which depicts a faint image of a man with unusual headgear, has been tentatively dated to the Elamite period.

=== Achaemenid tombs ===
Four tombs belonging to Achaemenid kings are carved out of the rock face at a considerable height above the ground. The four tombs are identical in terms of design and accompanying relief decoration. In the upper register each tomb includes an elaborate relief depicting the king holding a bow and paying homage to a fire altar and a figure emerging from a winged disk, often identified as the Zoroastrian fravahar. The king and the altar stand on an elevated platform supported by two rows of 15 figures, each identified by a short inscription as representing a different province within the empire, with minor differences in their attire to correspond with the national dress of the corresponding region. Two other figures stand next to the base of the platform, and a further six figures stand in niches carved along the edges of the scene (three on either side). The wider middle register depicts a faux-portico of an Achaemenid palace, with double-protome bull's head capitals. The bottom register is left bare.

==== Tomb of Darius the Great ====
The tomb of Darius is the only tomb to include an extensive inscription on its facade, where it appears to the left of the king, divided into two main parts referred to as DNa and DNb, allowing it to be confidently attributed to Darius, who refers to himself by name within the text of the inscriptions. It is assumed to be the oldest of the four, and presumably served as the model for the three subsequent Achaemenid tombs cut at the site.

==== Other tombs ====
The other three tombs are believed to be those of Xerxes I (c. 486–465 BC), Artaxerxes I (c. 465–424 BC), and Darius II (c. 423–404 BC) respectively. The order of the tombs in Naqsh-e Rostam follows (left to right): Darius II, Artaxerxes I, Darius I, Xerxes I. The matching of the other kings to tombs is somewhat speculative; the relief figures are not intended as individualized portraits.

==== Darius I inscription ====
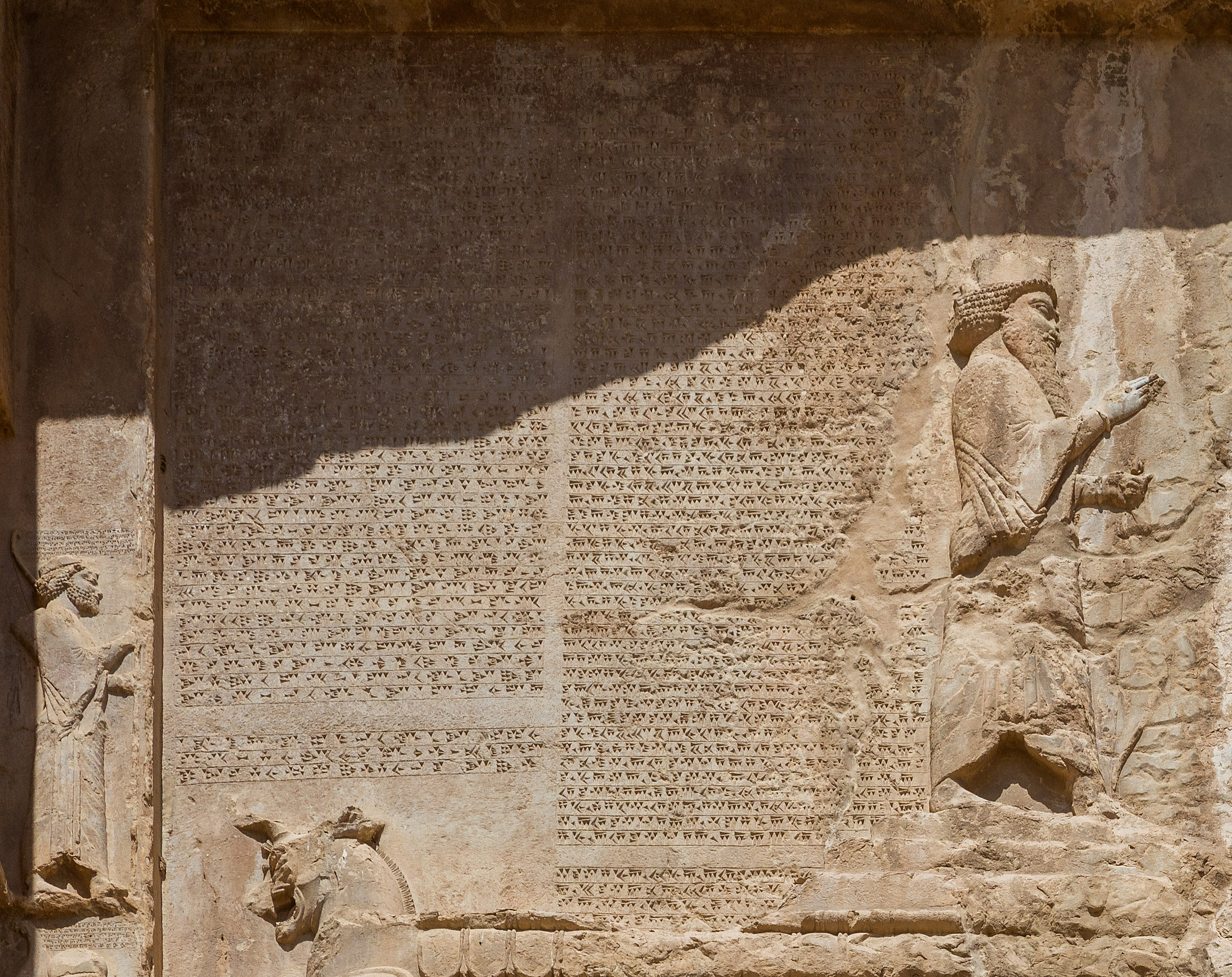
Darius I inscription (the DNa inscription) on the upper left corner of the facade of his tomb.

An inscription by Darius I, from c.490 BCE, generally referred to as the "DNa inscription" in scholarly works, appears in the top left corner of the facade of his tomb. It mentions the conquests of Darius I and his various achievements during his life. Its exact date is not known, but it can be assumed to be from the last decade of his reign. Like several other inscriptions by Darius, the territories controlled by the Achaemenid Empire are specifically listed, which formed the largest empire during antiquity. His empire encompassed Macedon and Thrace in Europe, Egypt in North Africa, Babylon and Assyria in Mesopotamia, the steppes of Eurasia, Bactria in Central Asia, up to Gandhara and the Indus in the Indian Subcontinent which were annexed during the Achaemenid conquest of the Indus Valley.

Darius I inscription
(DNa inscription)

Darius I inscription (DNa inscription)
English translation	Original
A great god is Ahura Mazda, who created this earth, who created yonder sky, who created man, who created happiness for man, who made Darius king, one king of many, one lord of many. I am Darius the great king, king of kings, king of countries containing all kinds of men, king in this great earth far and wide, son of Hystaspes, an Achaemenid, a Persian, son of a Persian, an Aryan, having Aryan lineage. King Darius says: By the favor of Ahuramazda these are the countries which I seized outside of Persia; I ruled over them; they bore tribute to me; they did what was said to them by me; they held my law firmly; Media, Elam, Parthia, Aria, Bactria, Sogdia, Chorasmia, Drangiana, Arachosia, Sattagydia, Gandara [Gadâra], India [Hiduš], the haoma-drinking Scythians, the Scythians with pointed caps, Babylonia, Assyria, Arabia, Egypt, Armenia, Cappadocia, Lydia, the Greeks (Yauna), the Scythians across the sea (Sakâ), Thrace, the petasos-wearing Greeks [Yaunâ], the Libyans, the Nubians, the men of Maka and the Carians. King Darius says: Ahuramazda, when he saw this earth in commotion, thereafter bestowed it upon me, made me king; I am king. By the favor of Ahuramazda I put it down in its place; what I said to them, that they did, as was my desire. If now you shall think that "How many are the countries which King Darius held?" look at the sculptures [of those] who bear the throne, then shall you know, then shall it become known to you: the spear of a Persian man has gone forth far; then shall it become known to you: a Persian man has delivered battle far indeed from Persia. Darius the King says: This which has been done, all that by the will of Ahuramazda I did. Ahuramazda bore me aid, until I did the work. May Ahuramazda protect me from harm, and my royal house, and this land: this I pray of Ahuramazda, this may Ahuramazda give to me! O man, that which is the command of Ahuramazda, let this not seem repugnant to you; do not leave the right path; do not rise in rebellion!	baga vazṛka Ahuramazdā, haya imām būmim adā, haya avam asmānam adā, haya martiyam adā, haya šiyātim martiyahyā, haya Dārayavahum xšāyaθiyam akunauš, aivam parūnām xšāyaθiyam, aivam parūnām framātāram. adam Dārayavahuš, xšāyaθiya vazṛka, xšāyaθiya xšāyaθiyānām, xšāyaθiya dahyūnām vizpazanānām, xšāyaθiya ahyāyā būmiyā vazṛkāyā dūrai api, Vištāspahyā puça, Haxāmanišiya, Pārsa, Pārsahyā puça, Ariya, Ariya-ciça. θāti Dārayavahuš xšāyaθiya: vašnā Ahuramazdāhā imā dahyāva tayā adam agṛbāyam apataram hacā Pārsā; adamšam patiyaxšayai, manā bājim abaraha; tayašam hacāma aθanhya, ava akunava; dātam, taya manā, avadiš adāraya: Mādam, Ūja, Parθava, Haraiva, Bāxtriš, Suguda, Uvārazmiš, Zranka, Harahuvatiš, Θataguš, Gandāra, Hinduš, Sakā haumavargā, Sakā tigraxaudā, Bābiruš, Aθura, Arbāya, Mudrāya, Armina, Katpatuka, Sparda, Yauna, Sakā tayai paradraya, Skudra, Yaunā takabarā, Putāyā, Kūšiyā, Maciyā, Kṛkā. θāti Dārayavahuš xšāyaθiya: Ahuramazdā yaθā avaina imām būmim yaudantim, pasāvadim manā frābara; mām xšāyaθiyam akunauš; adam xšāyaθiya ami; vašnā Ahuramazdāhā adamšim gāθavā niyašādayam; tayašām adam aθanham, ava akunava, yaθā mām kāma āha; yadipati maniyāhai: ciyākaram avā dahyāva, tayā Dārayavahuš xšāyaθiya adāraya, patikara dīdi, tayai gāθūm baranti; adā xšnāsāhi, adatai azdā bavāti: Pārsahyā martiyahyā dūrai ṛštiš parāgmatā; adatai azda bavāti: Pārsa martiya dūrai hacā Pārsā parataram patiyajatā. θāti Dārayavahuš xšāyaθiya: aita, taya kṛtam, ava visam vašna Ahuramazdāhā akunavam; Ahuramazdāmai upastām abara, yātā kṛtam akunavam; mām Ahuramazdā pātu hacā gastā utāmai viθam utā imām dahyāum; aita adam Ahuramazdām jadiyāmi; aitamai Ahuramazdā dadātu. martiyā, hayā Ahuramazdāhā framānā, hautai gastā mā θadaya; paθim tayām rāstām mā avarada; mā stabava.

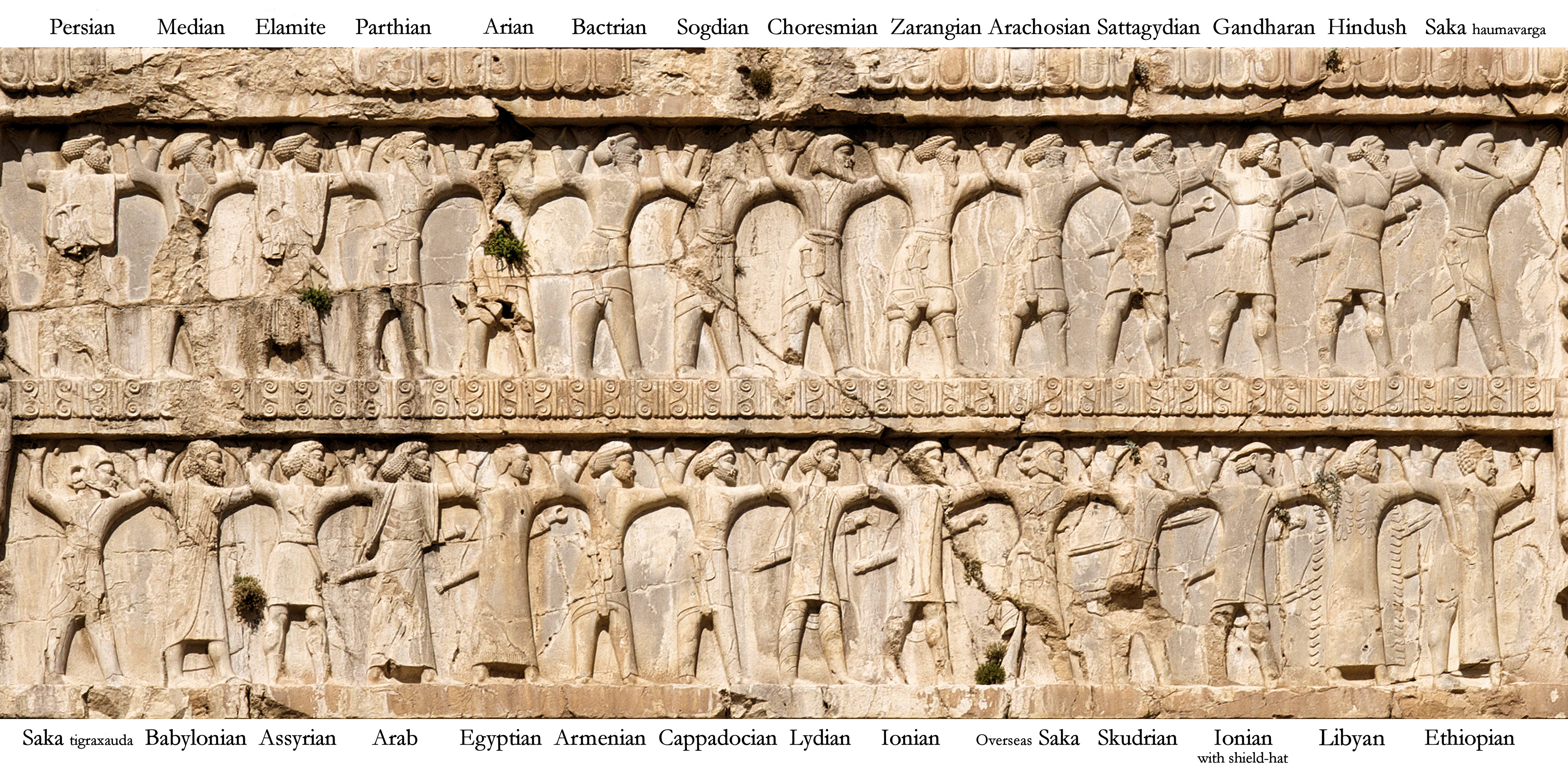
The nationalities mentioned in the DNa inscription are also depicted on the upper registers of all the tombs at Naqsh-e Rostam. One of the best preserved is that of Xerxes I.

DNf inscription.

There are various and contradictory reports about how this inscription was discovered. According to Mrs. Khadija Totunchi, she took a photo of this inscription in 2017. But she did not find a suitable person to translate and read the inscription. Also, according to Ebrahim Rustaei, in 2018, in cooperation with Abdul Majid Arfai, he presented an article about the inscription to the International Conference on History and Culture of Southern Iran (Historical Persia), in which a reading of the inscription was presented. However, this reading is very basic and has many flaws. But finally, the DNf petroglyph, which had been hidden in the shade and under algae and sediments for 2500 years, was officially and scientifically recorded by Mojtaba Doroodi and Soheil Delshad in February 2019.

Babylonian Transliteration: 1- [mx-x-x(-x) LÚ

pa-id-di-iš-ḫu]-ri-iš ˹a˺-˹na˺ m da-a-ri-i̭a-˹muš˺ LUGAL i-GA-ir-ra-bi

Translation (based on the Babylonian version): [Personal Name, Pati]schorian, invokes blessing upon Darius the King.

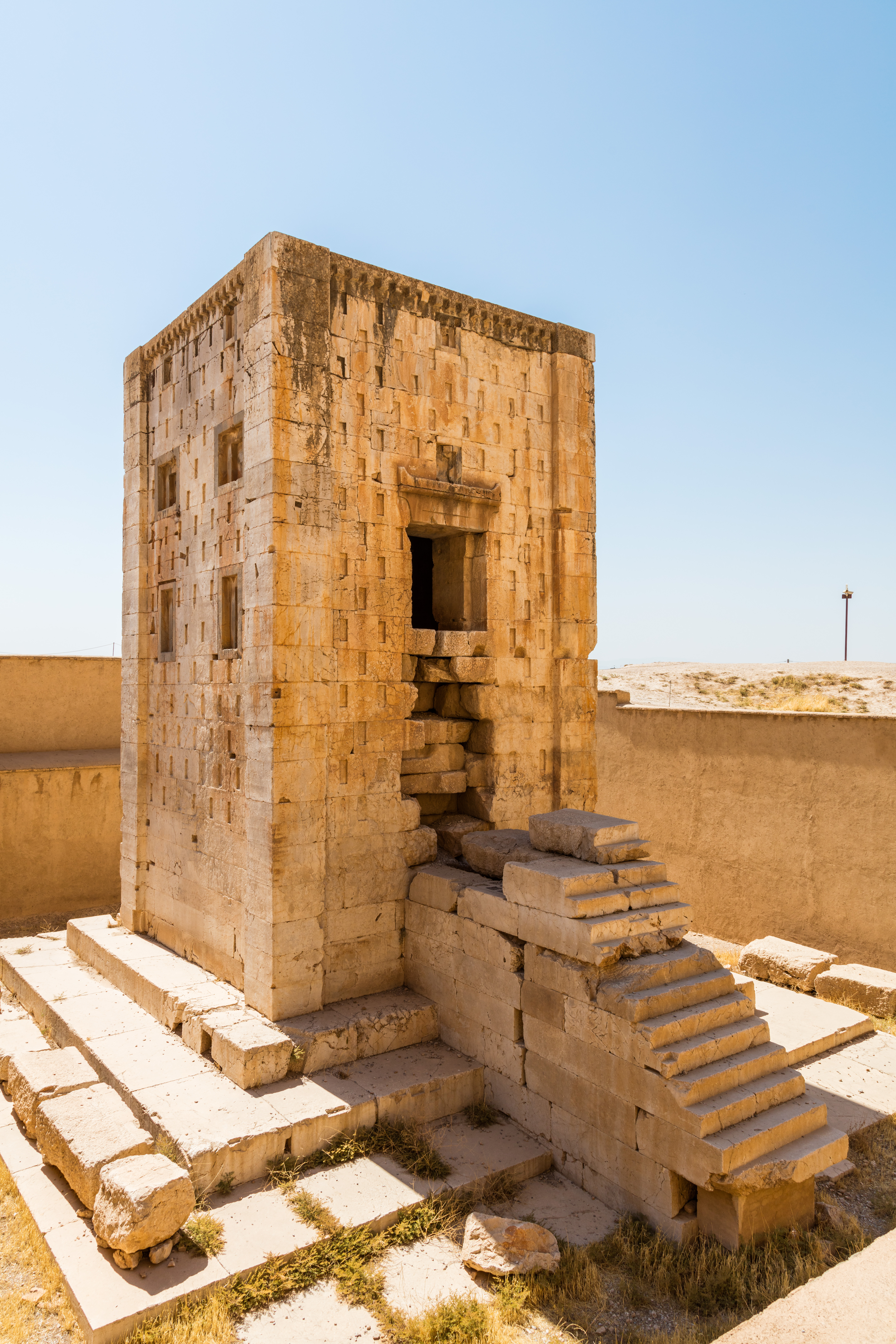
Cube of Zoroaster, a cube-shaped construction in the foreground, against the backdrop of Naqsh-e Rostam

=== Ka'ba-ye Zartosht ===
Ka'ba-ye Zartosht (meaning the "Cube of Zoroaster") is a 5th-century B.C Achaemenid square tower. The structure is a copy of a sister building at Pasargadae, the "Prison of Solomon" (Zendān-e Solaymān).

Several theories exist regarding the purpose of the Ka'ba-ye Zartosht structure.

=== Sasanian reliefs ===
Seven over-life sized rock reliefs at Naqsh-e Rostam depict monarchs of the Sasanian era.

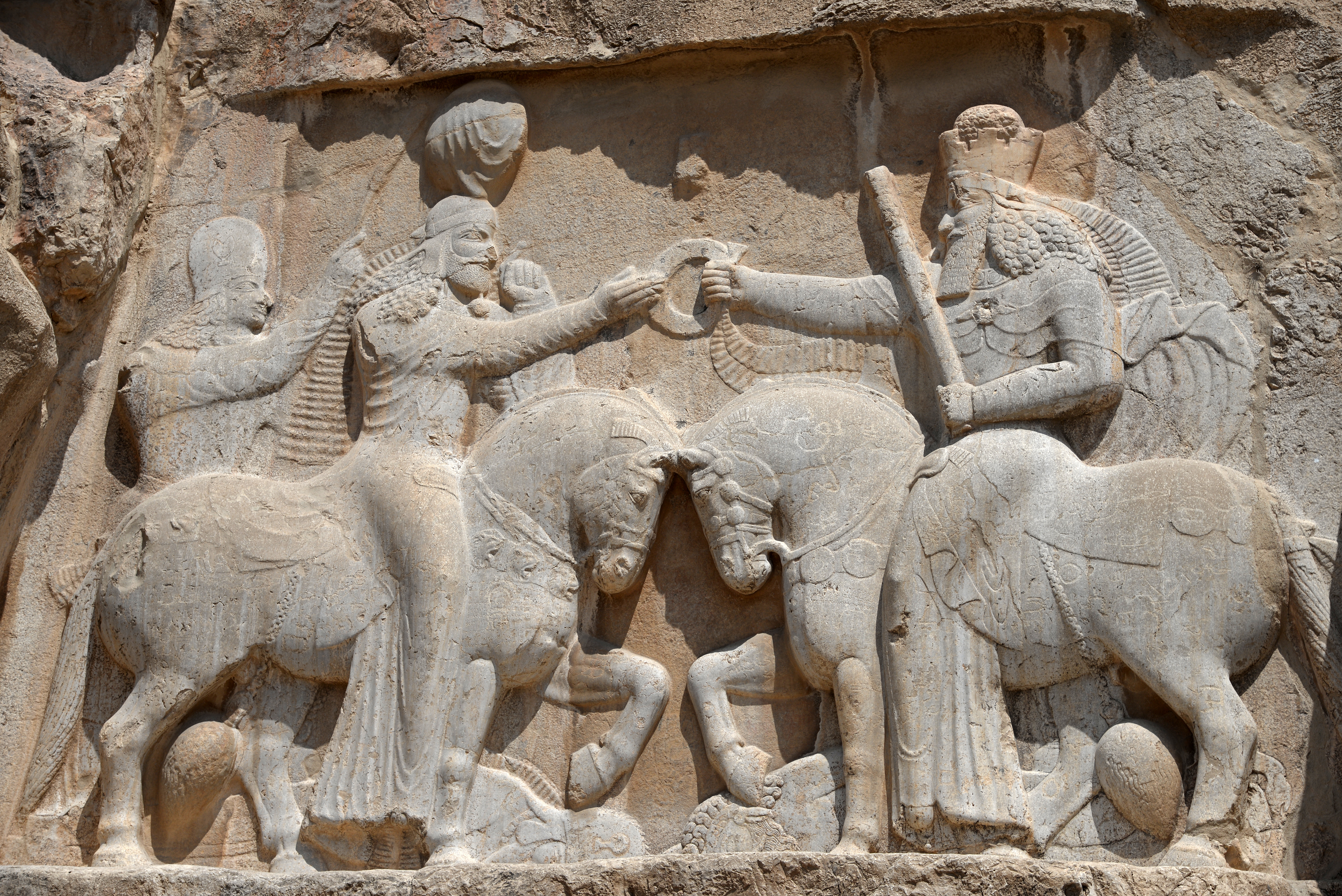
The investiture of Ardashir I

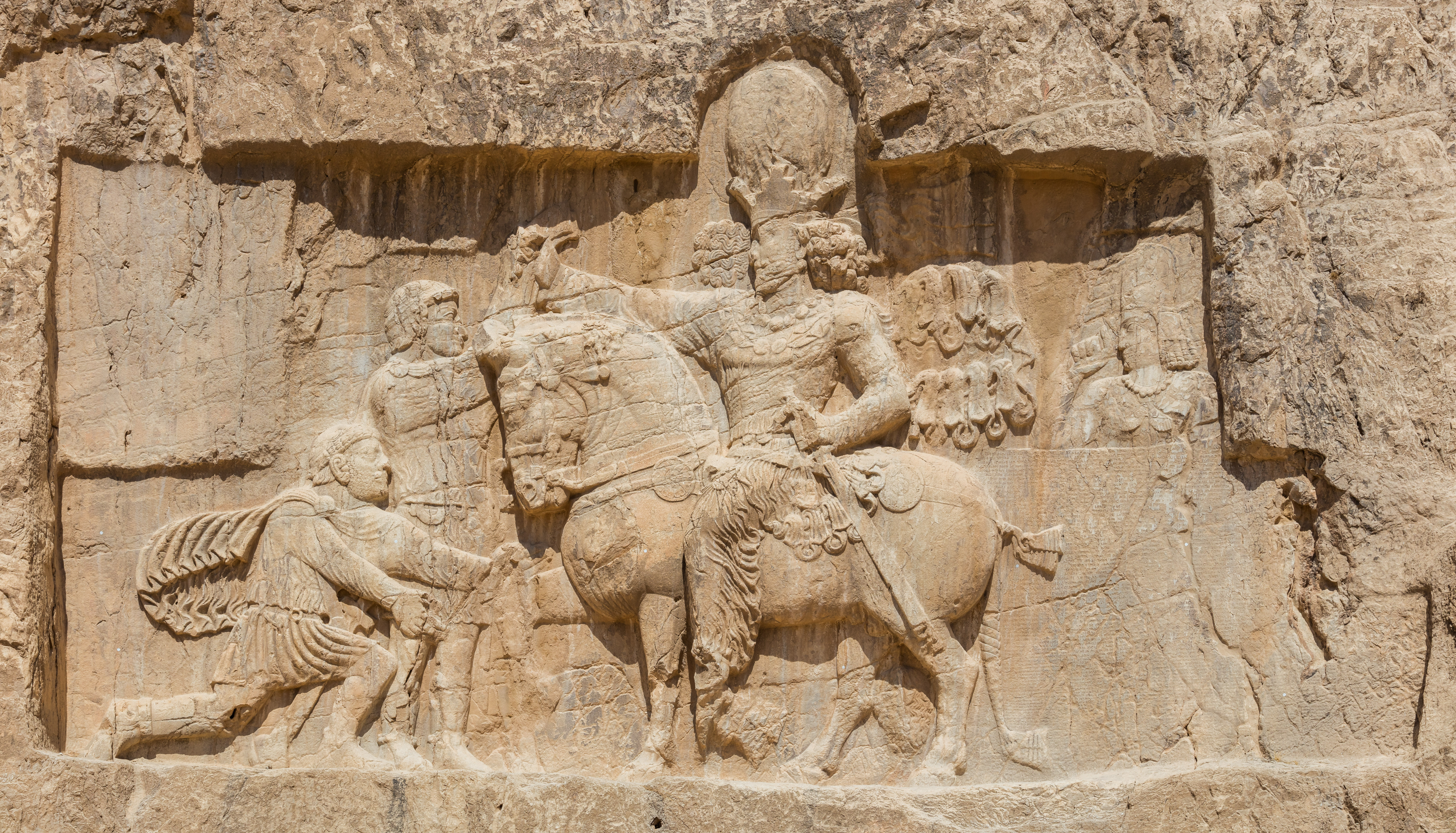
The triumph of Shapur I over the Roman emperors Valerian and Philip the Arab

==== Investiture relief of Ardashir I, c. 226–242 ====
The founder of the Sassanid Empire is seen being handed the ring of kingship by Ohrmazd.

==== Triumph of Shapur I, c. 241–272 ====
The most famous of the Sassanid rock reliefs, and depicts the victory of Shapur I over two Roman emperors, Valerian and Philip the Arab. Behind the king stands Kirtir, the mūbadān mūbad ('high priest'), the most powerful of the Zoroastrian Magi during the history of Iran.

In an inscription, Shapur I claims possession of the territory of the Kushans (Kūšān šahr) as far as "Purushapura" (Peshawar), suggesting he controlled Bactria and areas as far as the Hindu-Kush or even south of it:

I, the Mazda-worshipping lord, Shapur, king of kings of Iran and An-Iran… (I) am the Master of the Domain of Iran (Ērānšahr) and possess the territory of Persis, Parthian… Hindestan, the Domain of the Kushan up to the limits of Paškabur and up to Kash, Sughd, and Chachestan.

— Naqsh-e Rostam inscription of Shapur I

==== "Grandee" relief of Bahram II, c. 276–293 ====
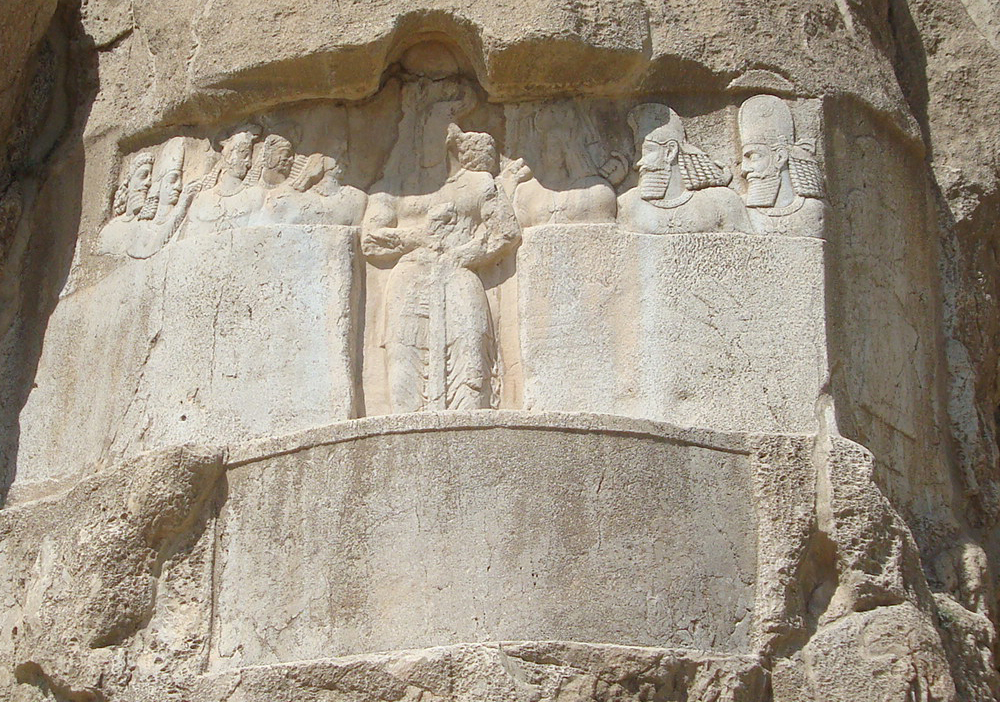
The grandee relief of Bahram II

On each side of the king, who is depicted with an oversized sword, figures face the king.

==== Two equestrian reliefs of Bahram II, c. 276–293 ====
The first equestrian relief, located immediately below the fourth tomb (perhaps that of Darius II), depicts the king battling a mounted Roman enemy. The second equestrian relief, located immediately below the tomb of Darius I, is divided into two registers, an upper and a lower one. In the upper register, the king appears to be forcing a Roman enemy, probably Roman emperor Carus from his horse. In the lower register, the king is again battling a mounted enemy wearing a headgear shaped as an animal's head, thought to be the vanquished Indo-Sassanian ruler Hormizd I Kushanshah.

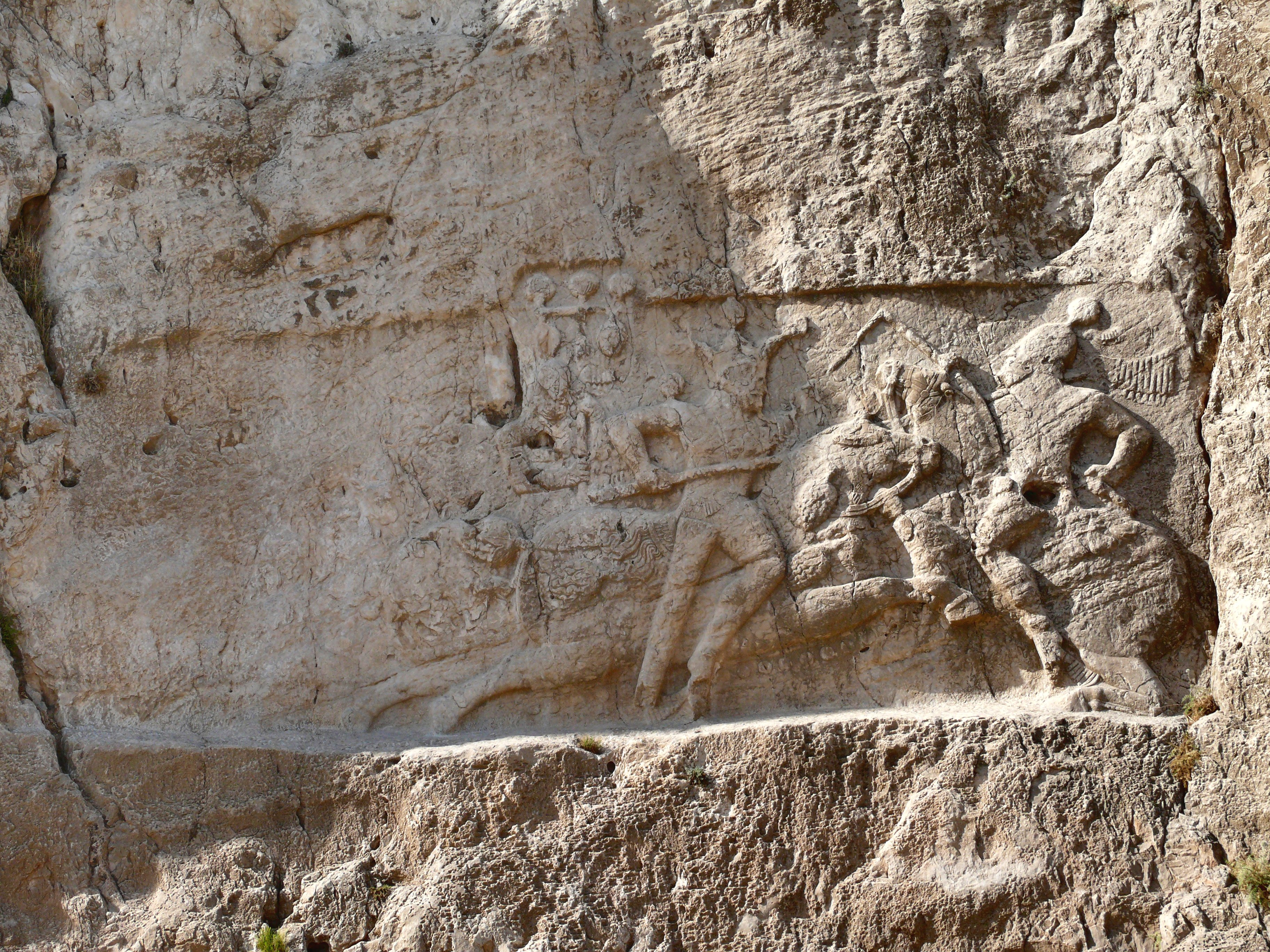
First equestrian relief.

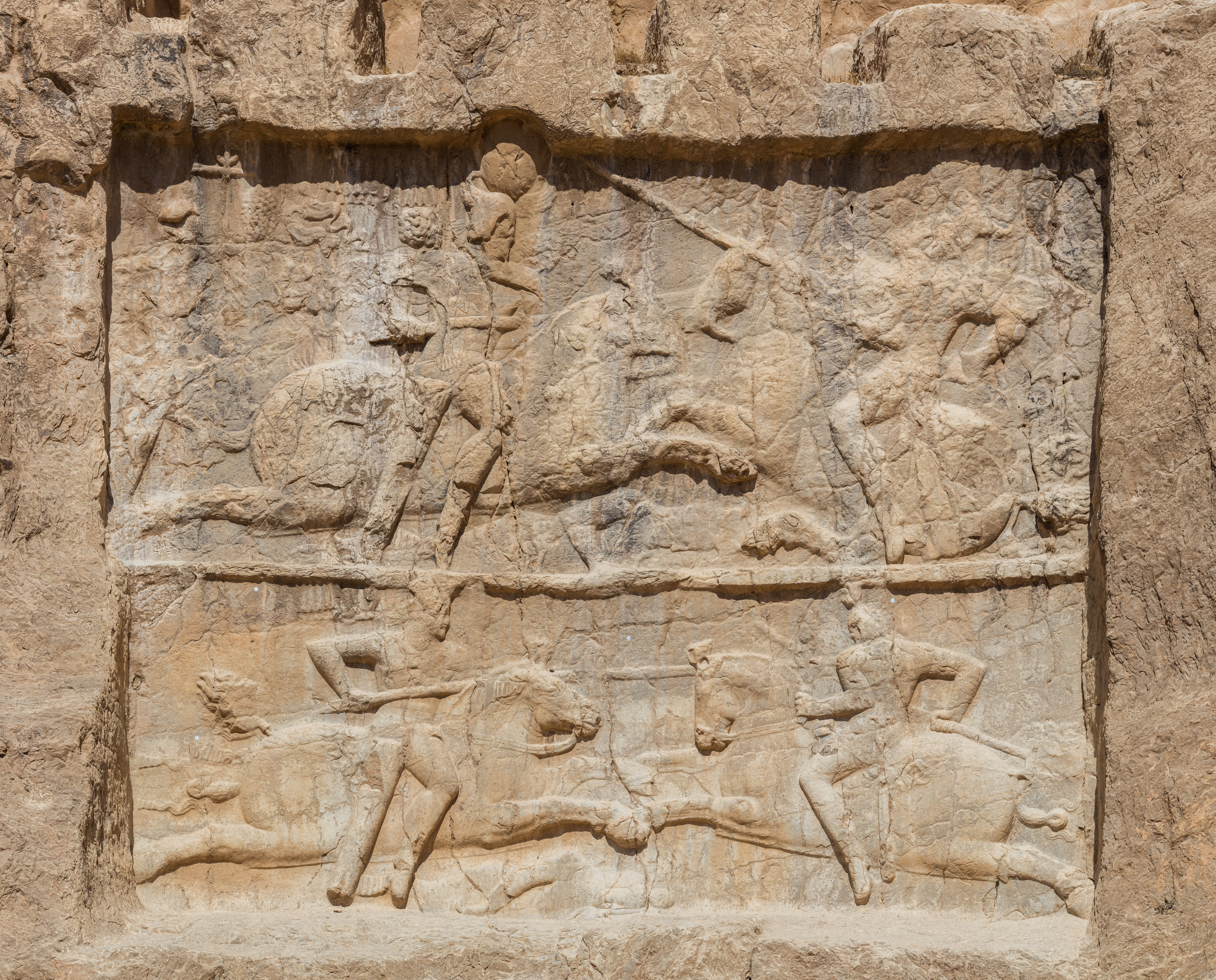
The two-panel equestrian relief.

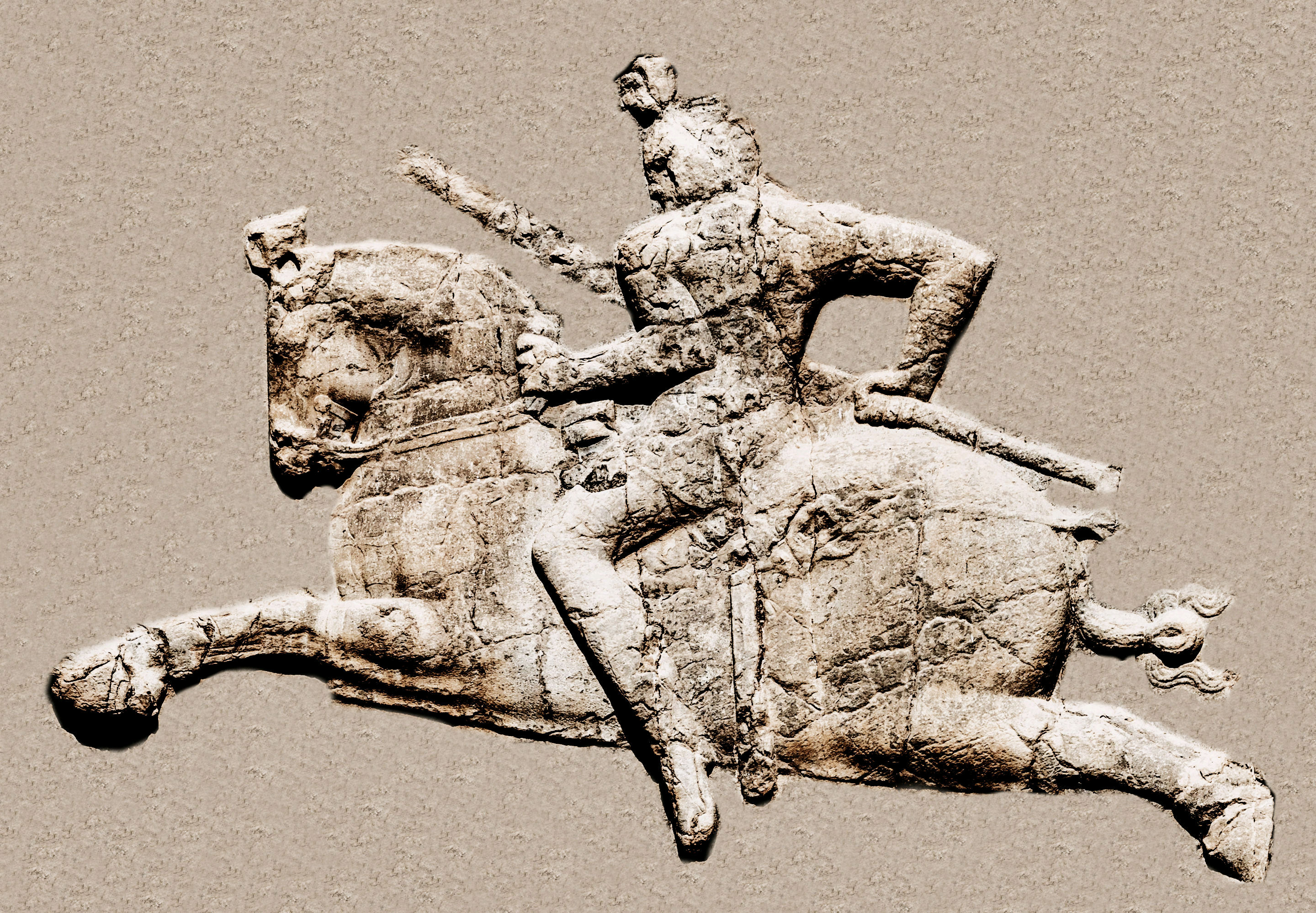
Hormizd I Kushanshah on the lower panel.

==== Investiture of Narseh, c. 293–303 ====
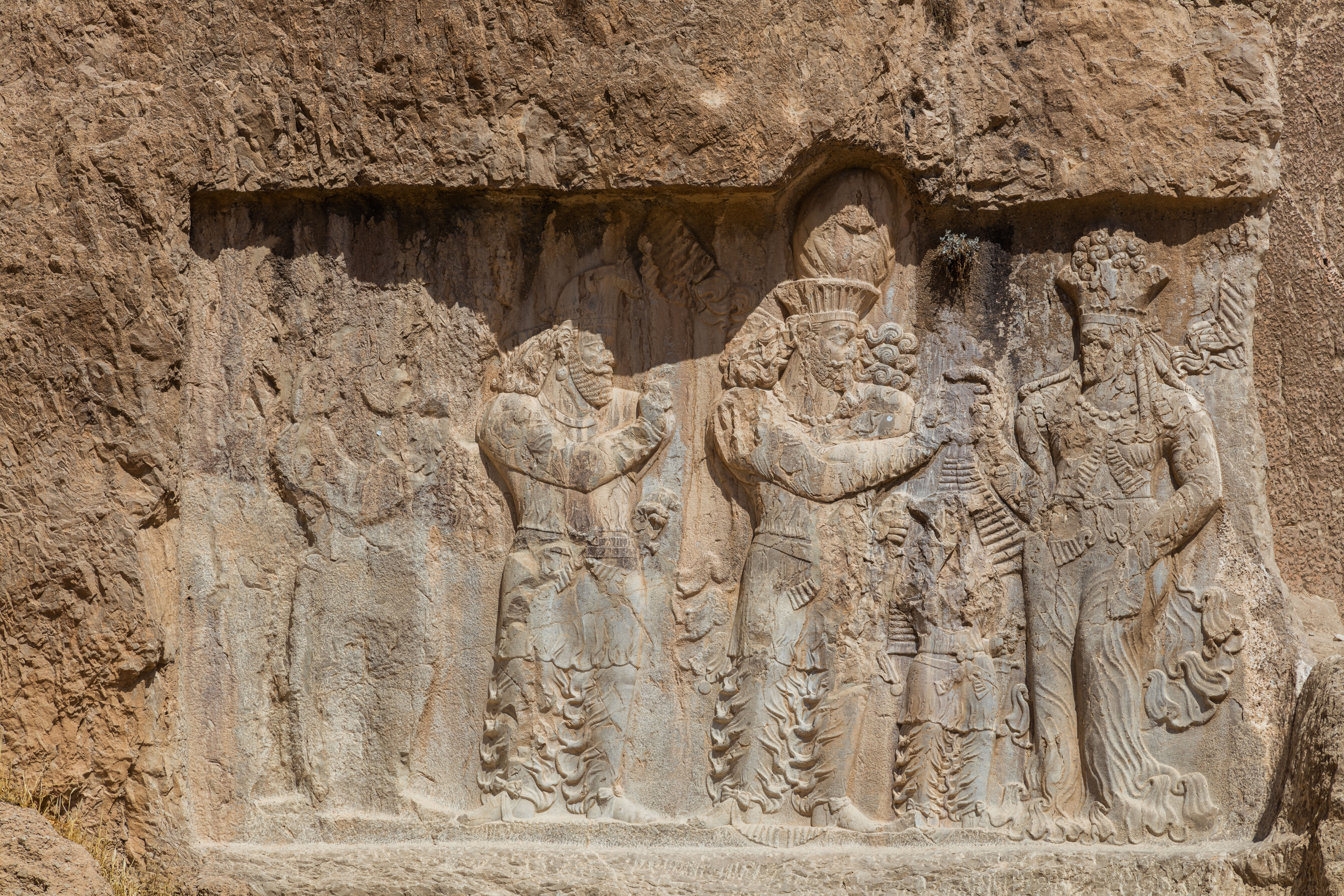
The investiture of Narseh

In this relief, the king is depicted as receiving the ring of kingship from a female figure that is frequently assumed to be the divinity Aredvi Sura Anahita.

==== Equestrian relief of Hormizd II, c 303–309 ====
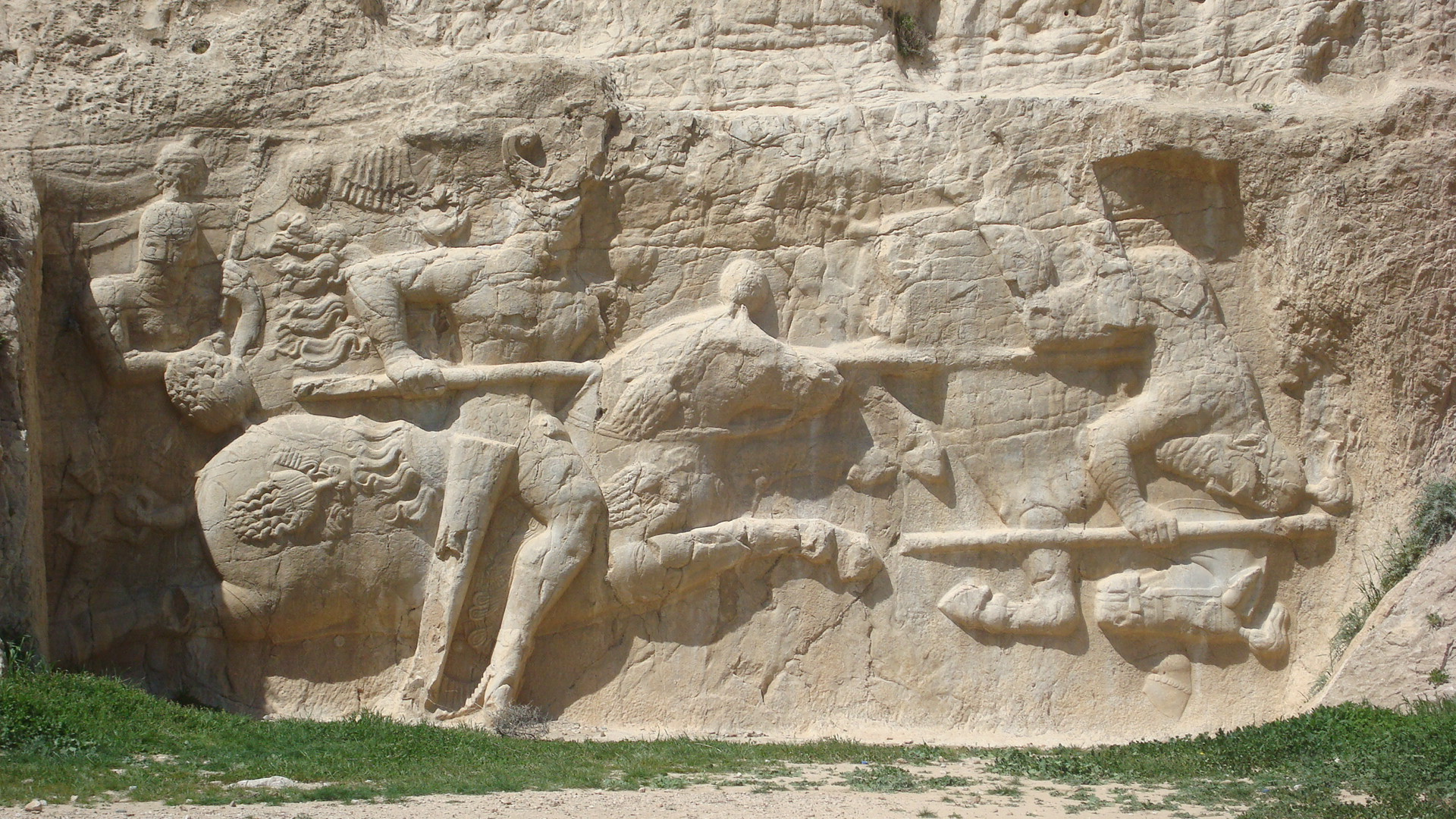
The equestrian relief of Hormizd II

This relief is below tomb 3 (perhaps that of Artaxerxes I) and depicts Hormizd forcing an enemy (perhaps Papak of Armenia) from his horse.

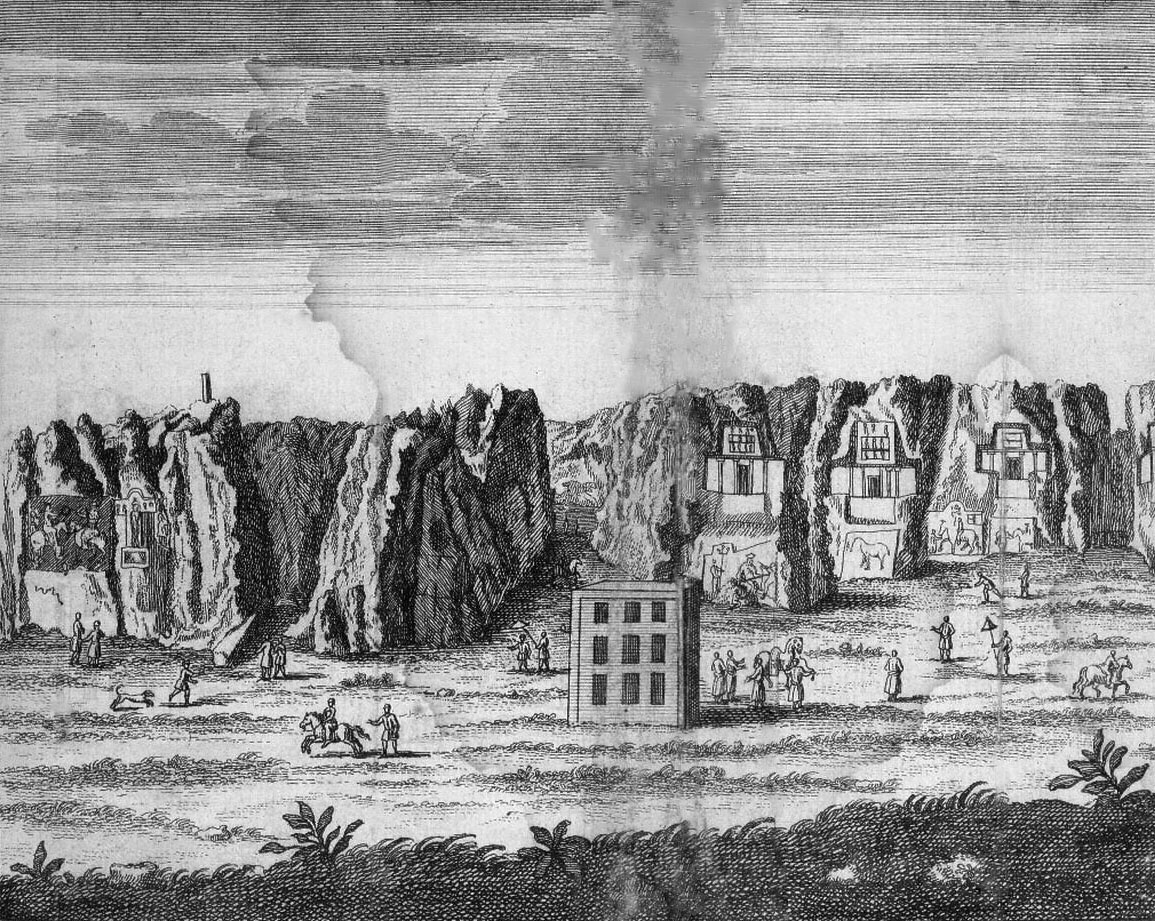
A 17th-century drawing of Naqsh e Rostam, by Jean Chardin

== Archaeology ==
In 1923, the German archaeologist Ernst Herzfeld made casts of the inscriptions on the tomb of Darius the Great. Since 1946, these casts have been held in the archives of the Freer Gallery of Art and the Arthur M. Sackler Gallery, Smithsonian Institution, in Washington, DC.

Naqsh-e Rostam was excavated for several seasons between 1936 and 1939 by a team from the Oriental Institute of the University of Chicago, led by Erich Schmidt.

== See also ==
- Behistun Inscription
- Bishapur
- Essaqwand Rock Tombs
- Istakhr
- Naqsh-e Rajab
- Persepolis
- Qadamgah (ancient site)
- Pasargadae and Tomb of Cyrus the Great
- Taq-e Bostan (rock reliefs of various Sassanid kings)
- List of colossal sculptures in situ
- Kogan Cave
