= Tomb of Artaxerxes I of Persia =

Tomb of Artaxerxes I آرامگاه اردشیر یکم (in Persian)
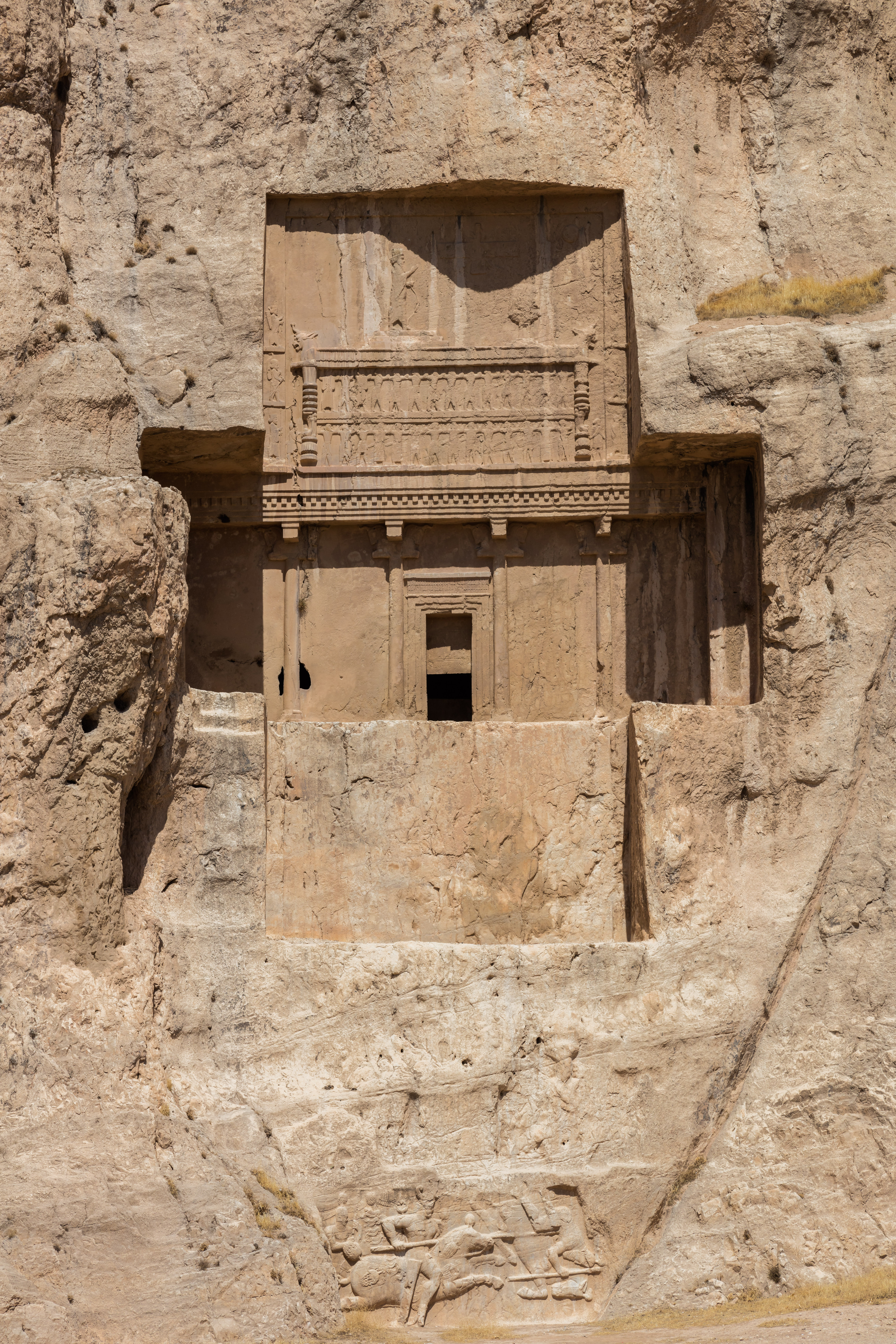
- Tomb of Artaxerxes I

- Location Pasargadae Iran
- Location: Marvdasht, Iran

History
- Built: Achaemenid Empire

Site notes
- Architectural styles: Persian architecture Achaemenid architecture

The Tomb of Artaxerxes (Persian: آرامگاه اردشیر یکم) is a catacomb located in Marvdasht. It is part of the Naqsh-e Rostam necropolis and is the burial place of the Achaemenid ruler Artaxerxes I.

== Gallery ==
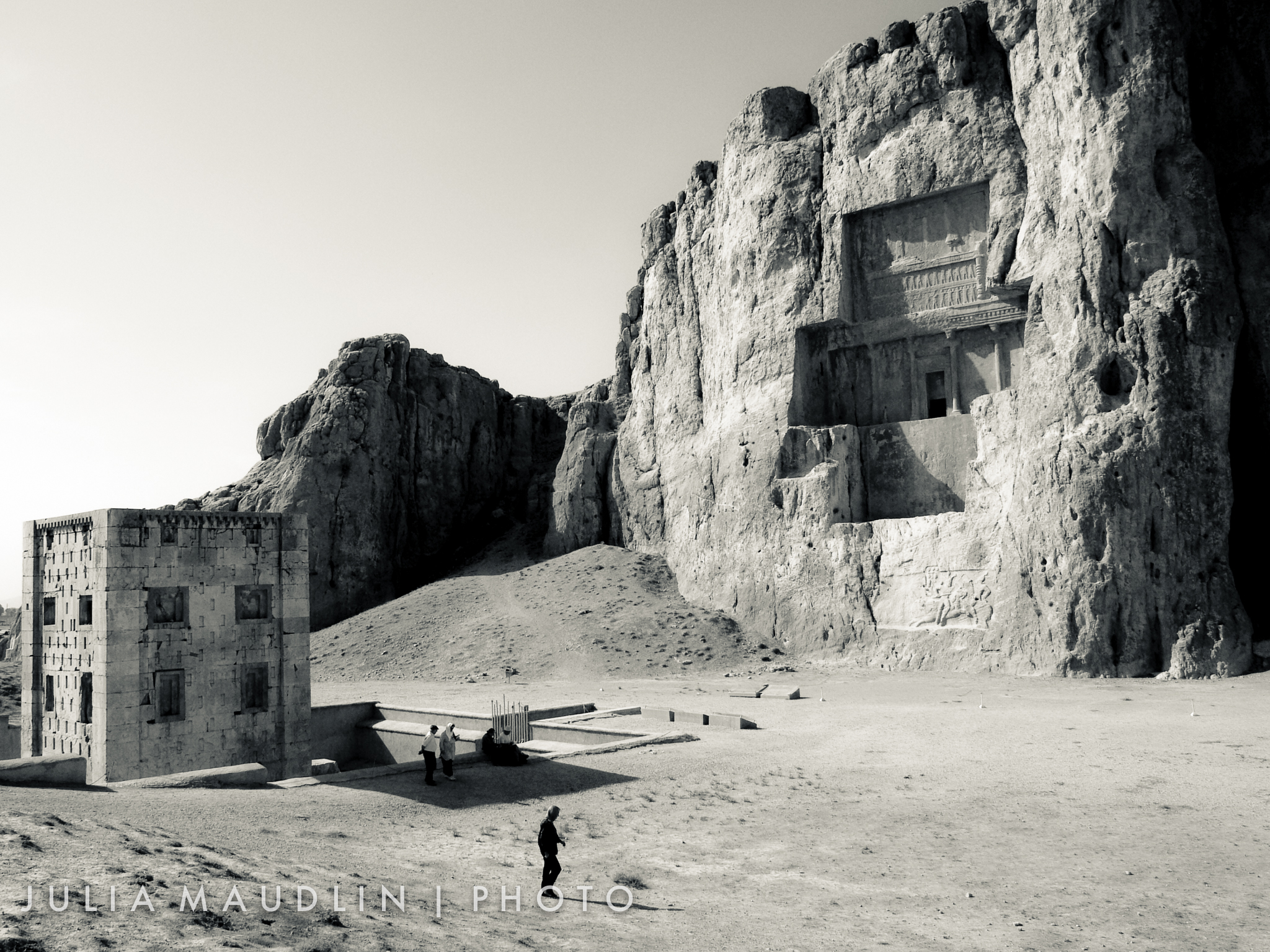

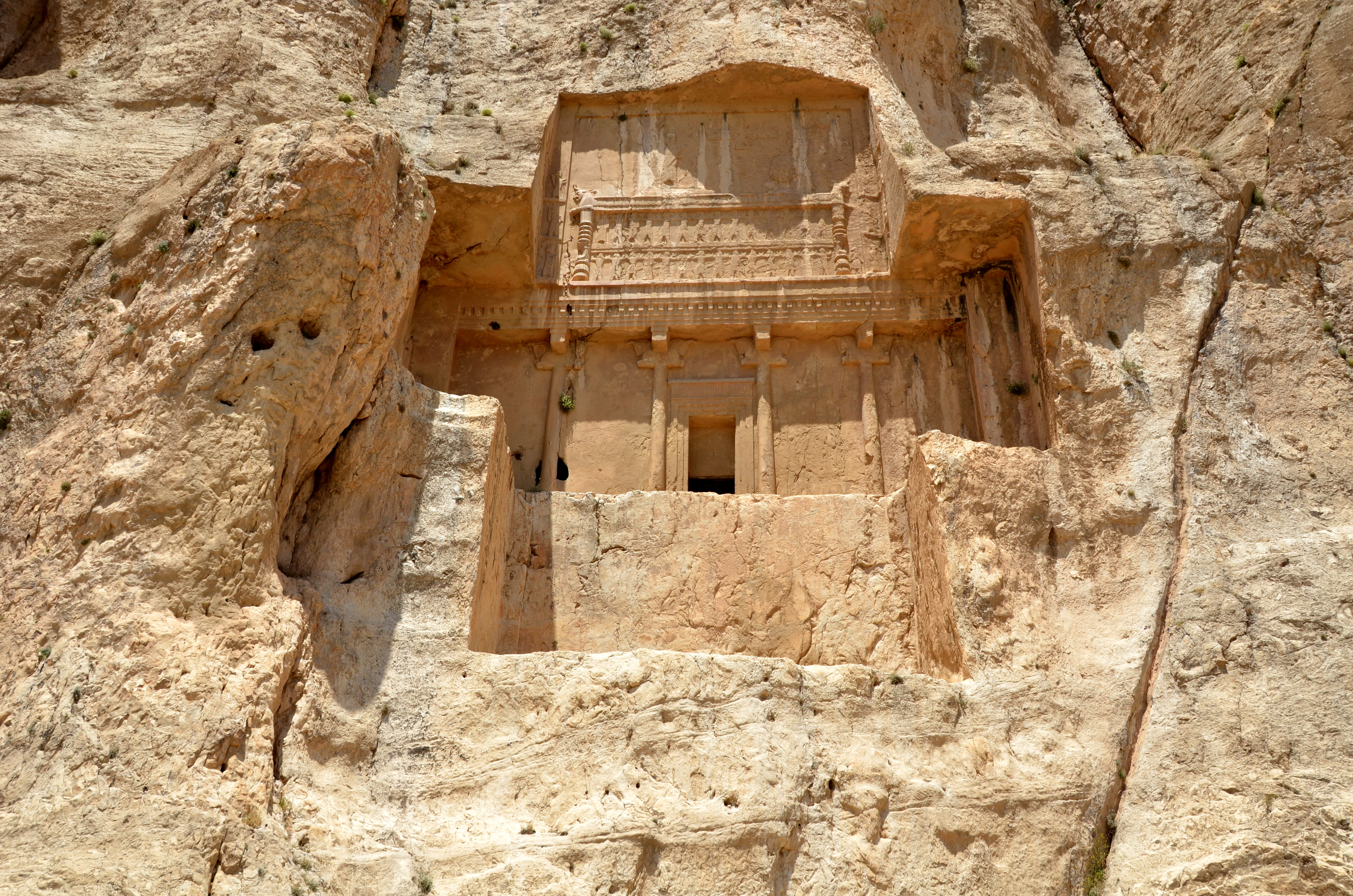

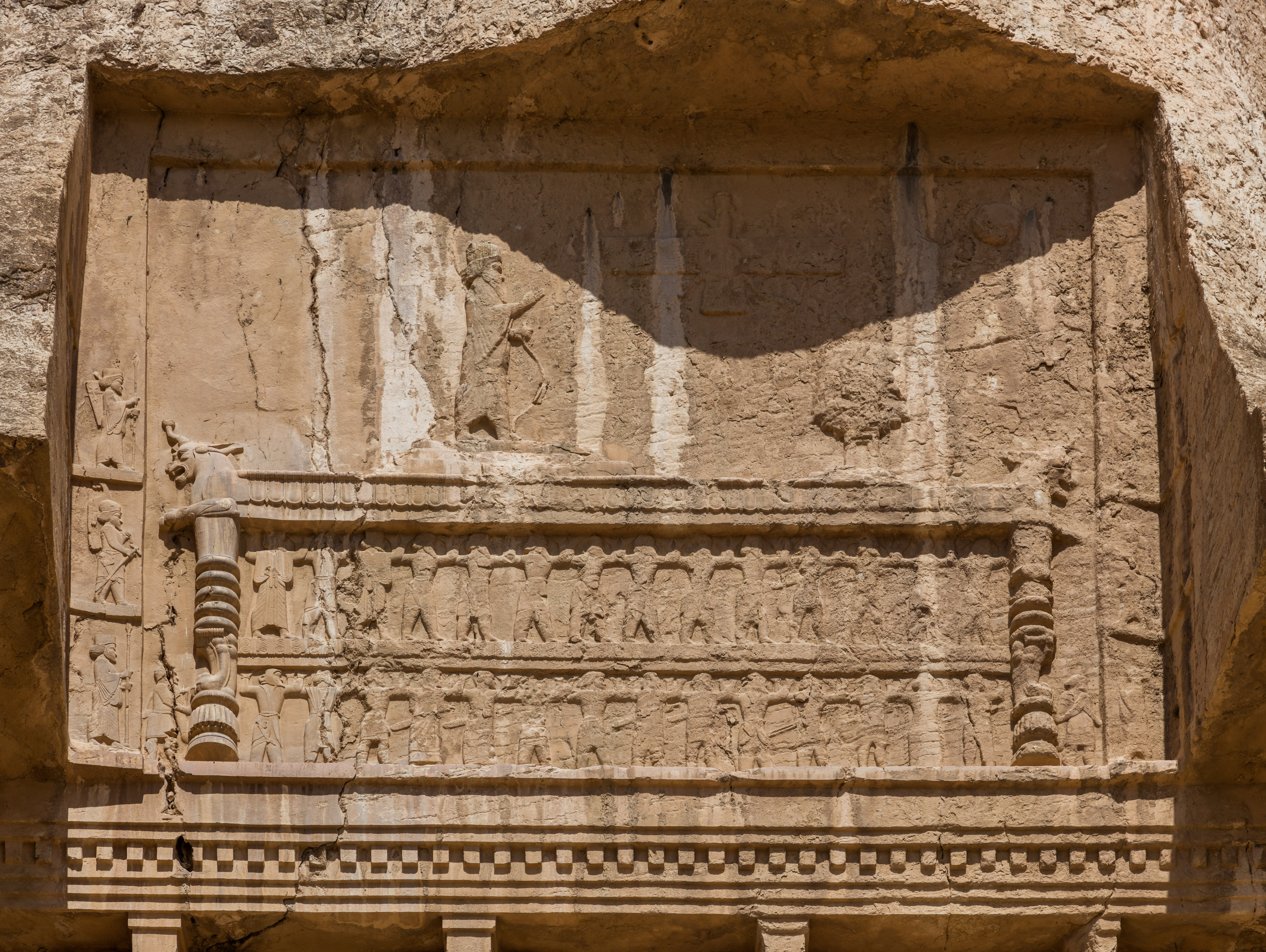

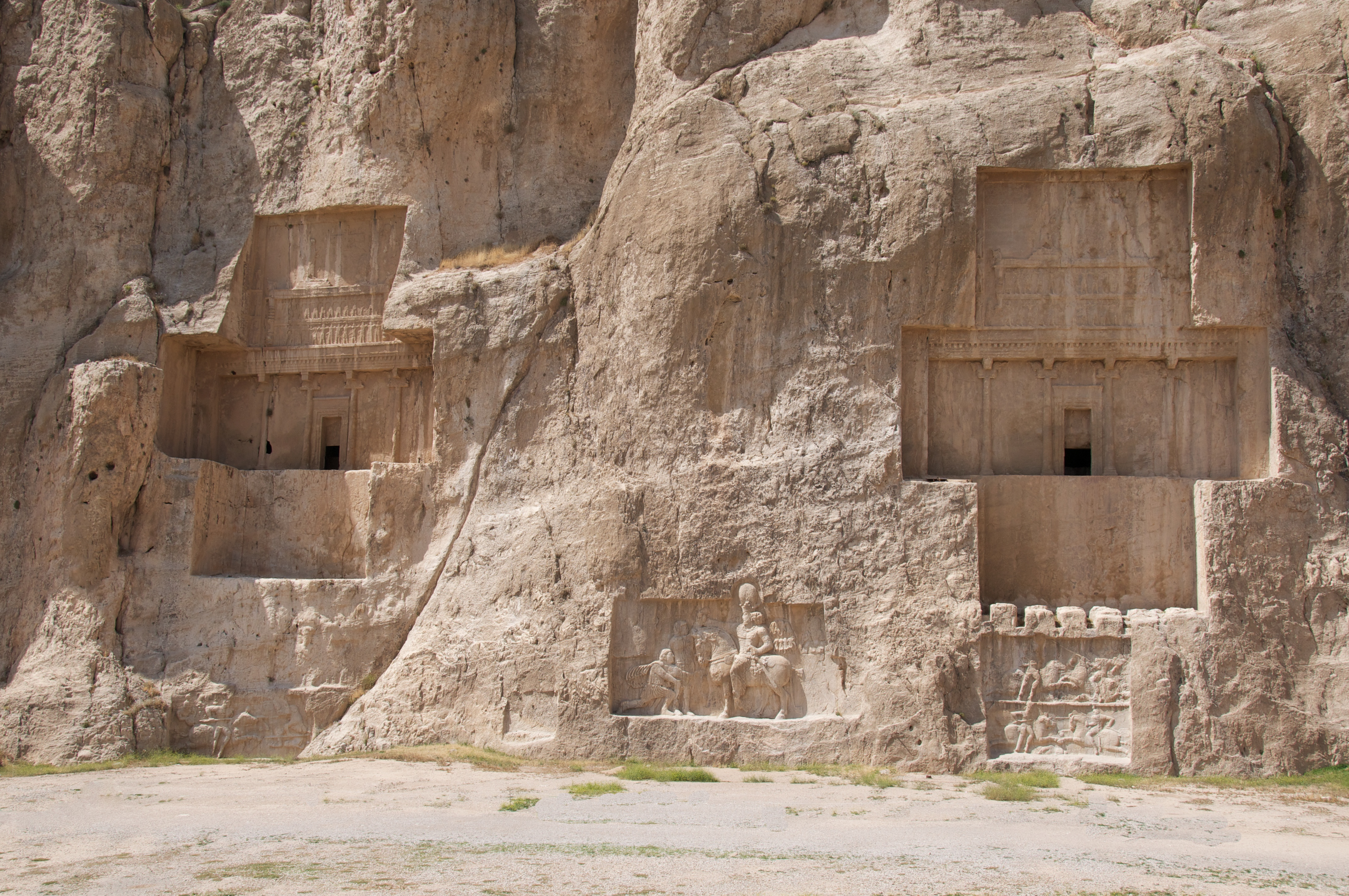

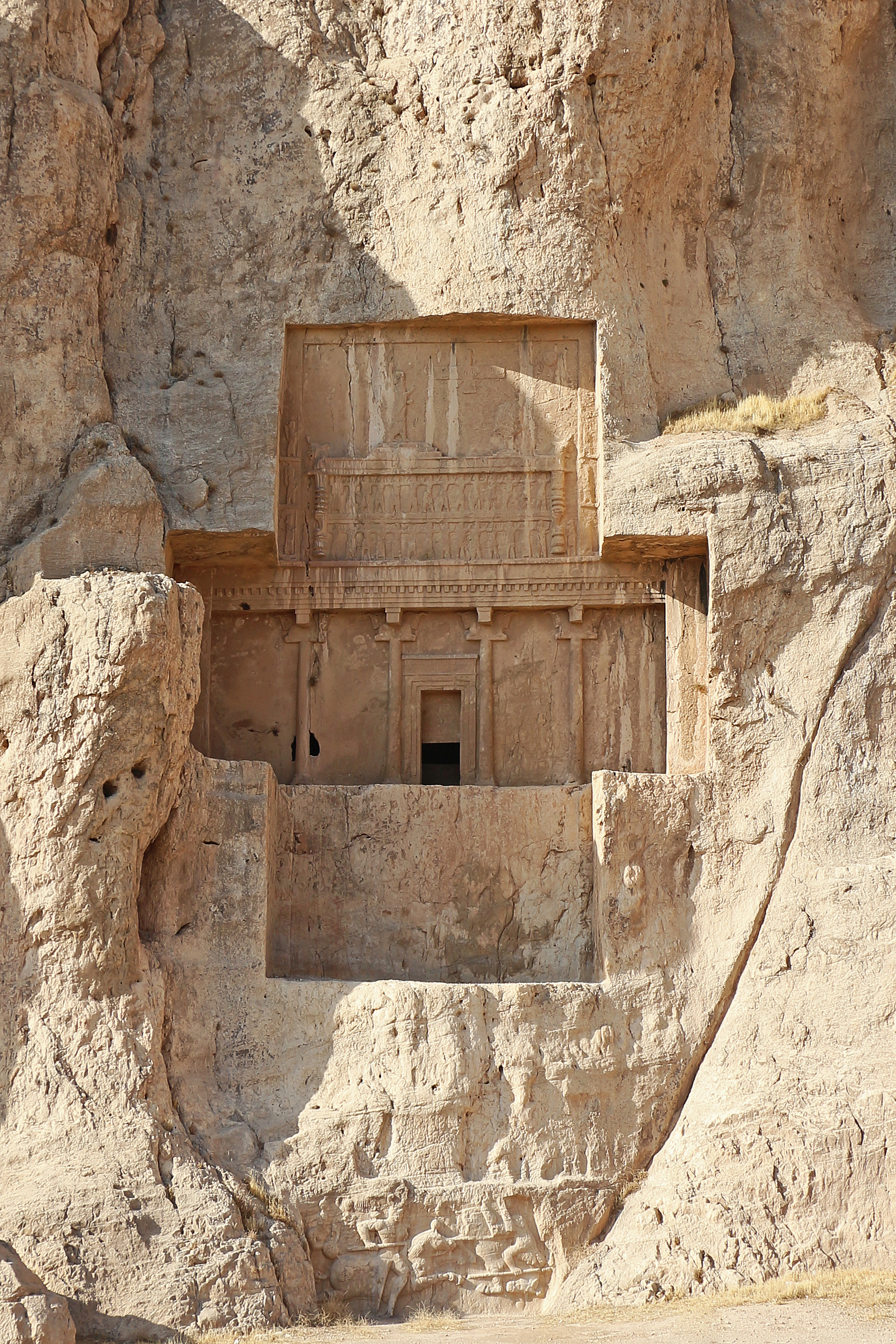

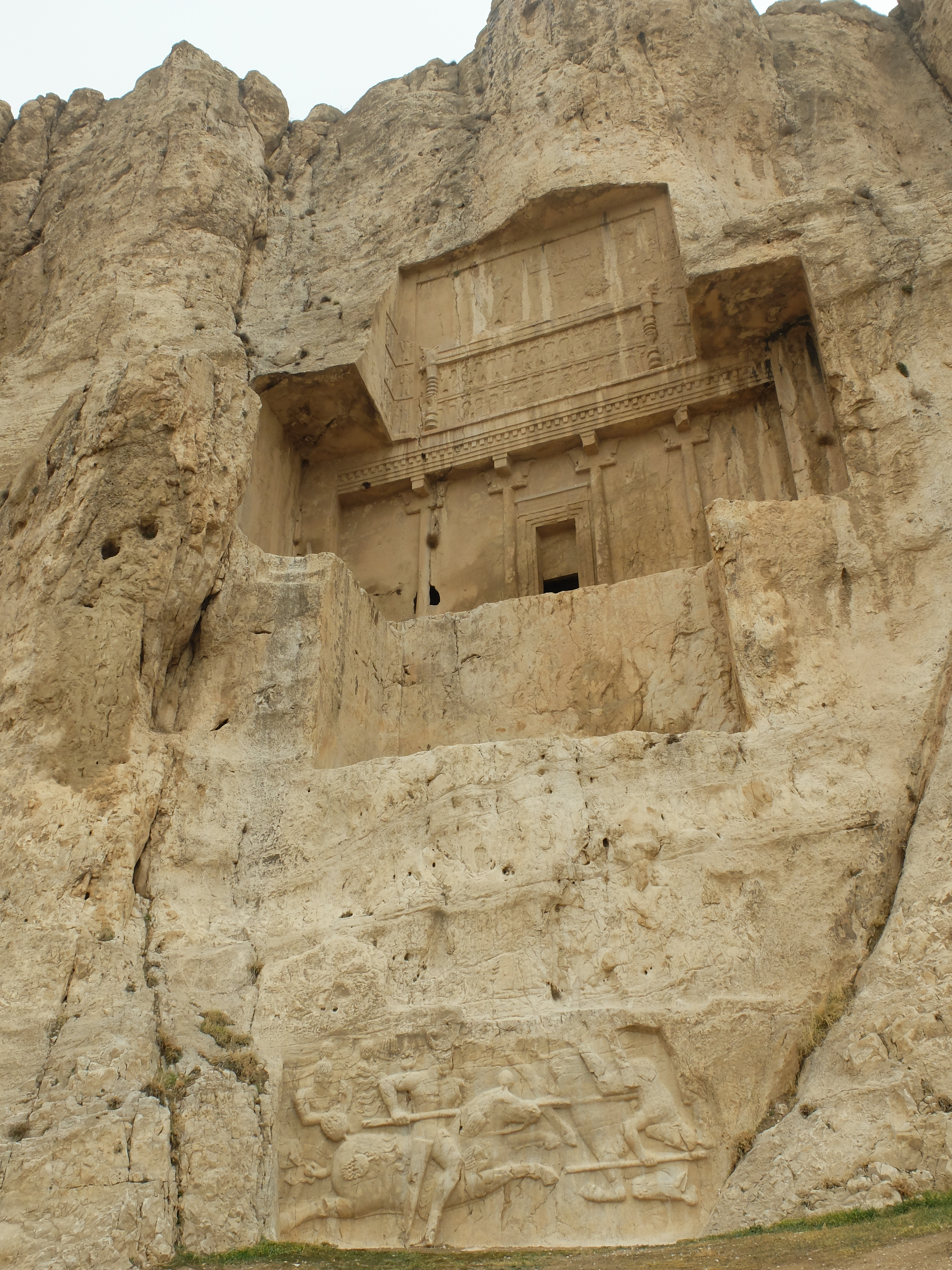

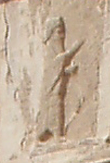

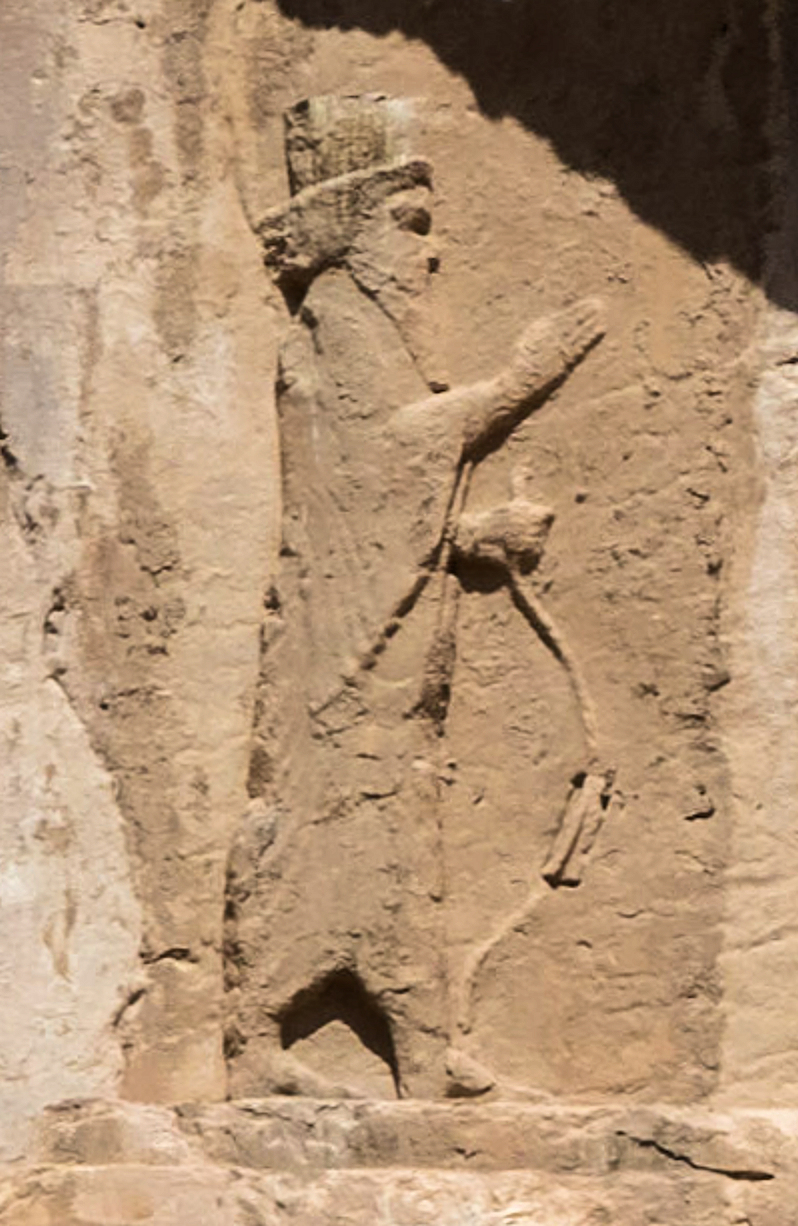
