= Tomb of Xerxes I =

Tomb of Xerxes I آرامگاه خشایارشا
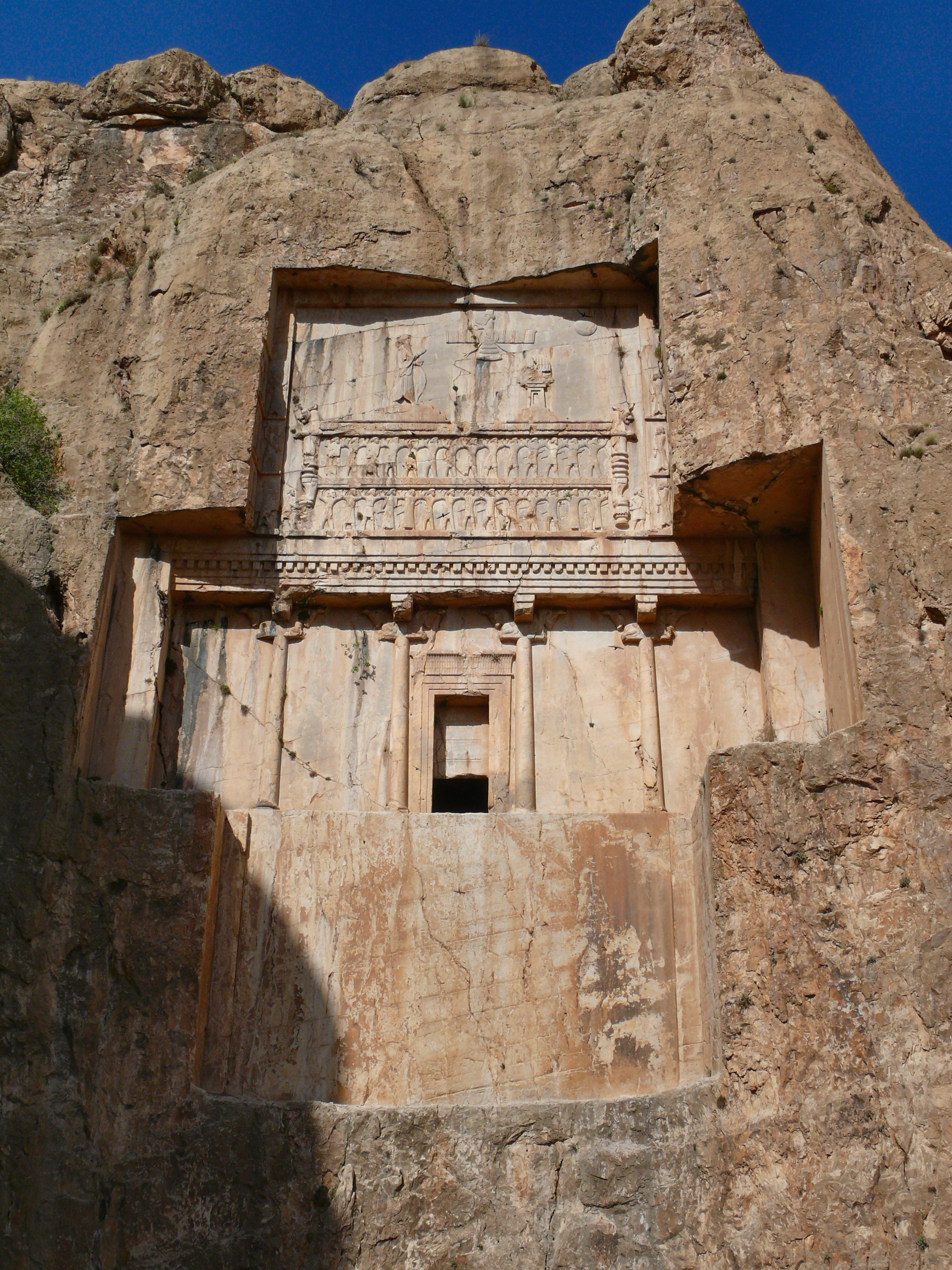
- Tomb of Xerxes I

- Location Pasargadae Iran
- Location: Marvdasht, Fars province, Iran

History
- Built: Achaemenid Empire

Site notes
- Architectural styles: Persian architecture Achaemenid architecture

The Tomb of Xerxes I (Persian: آرامگاه خشایارشا) is a catacombs located in Marvdasht. This tomb is part of the Naqsh-e Rostam and is Xerxes I's Tomb.

== Gallery ==
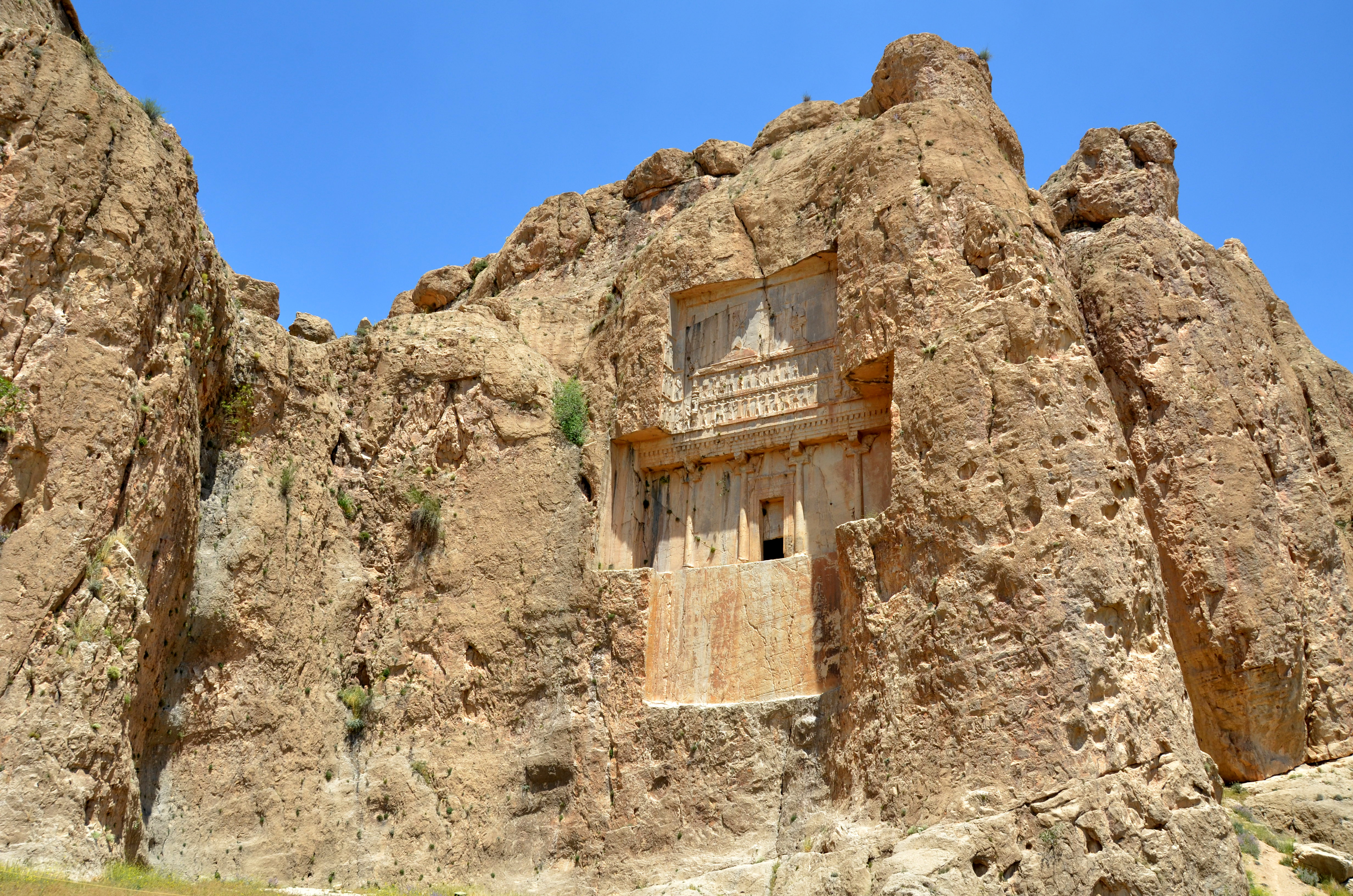

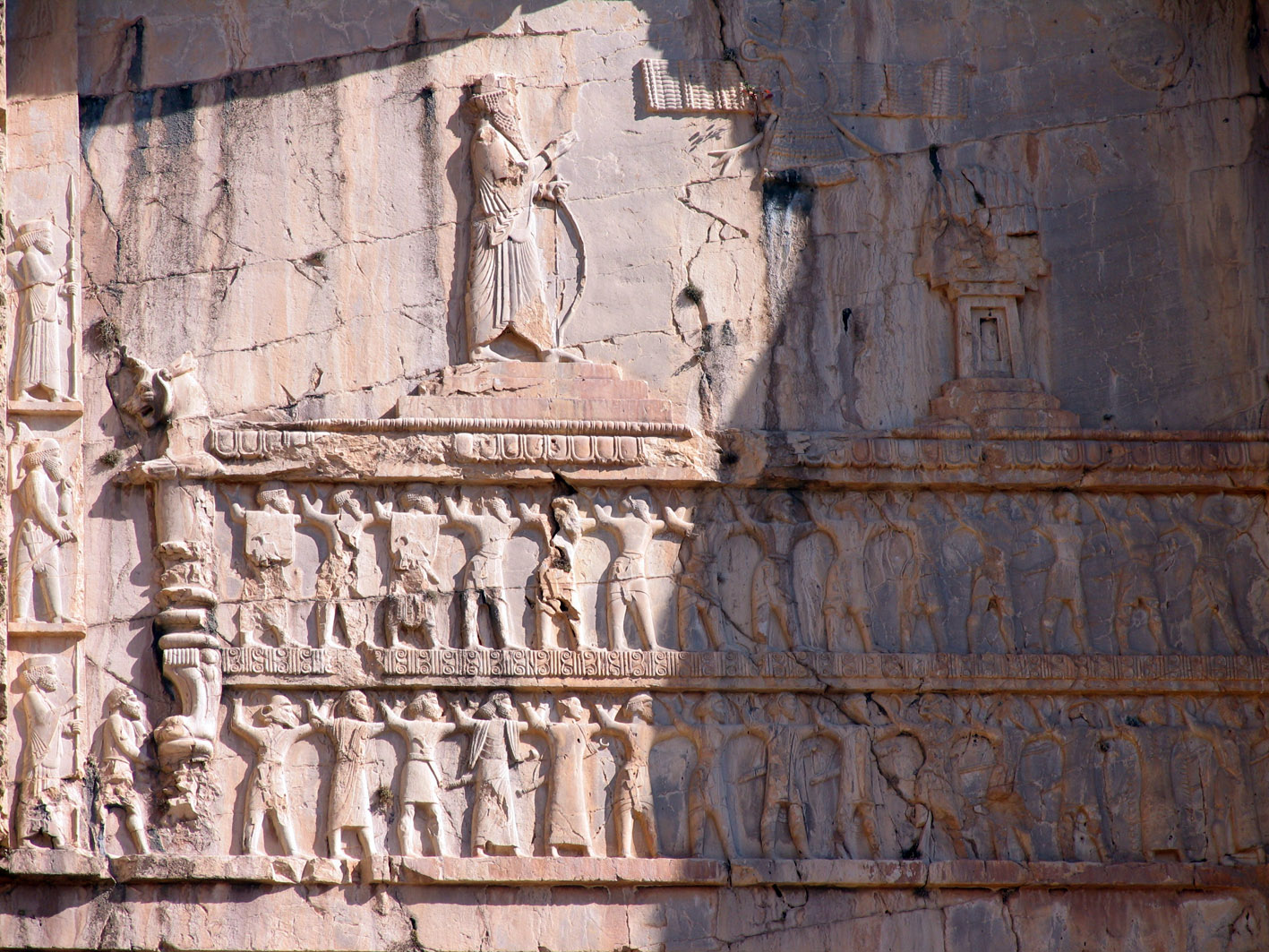

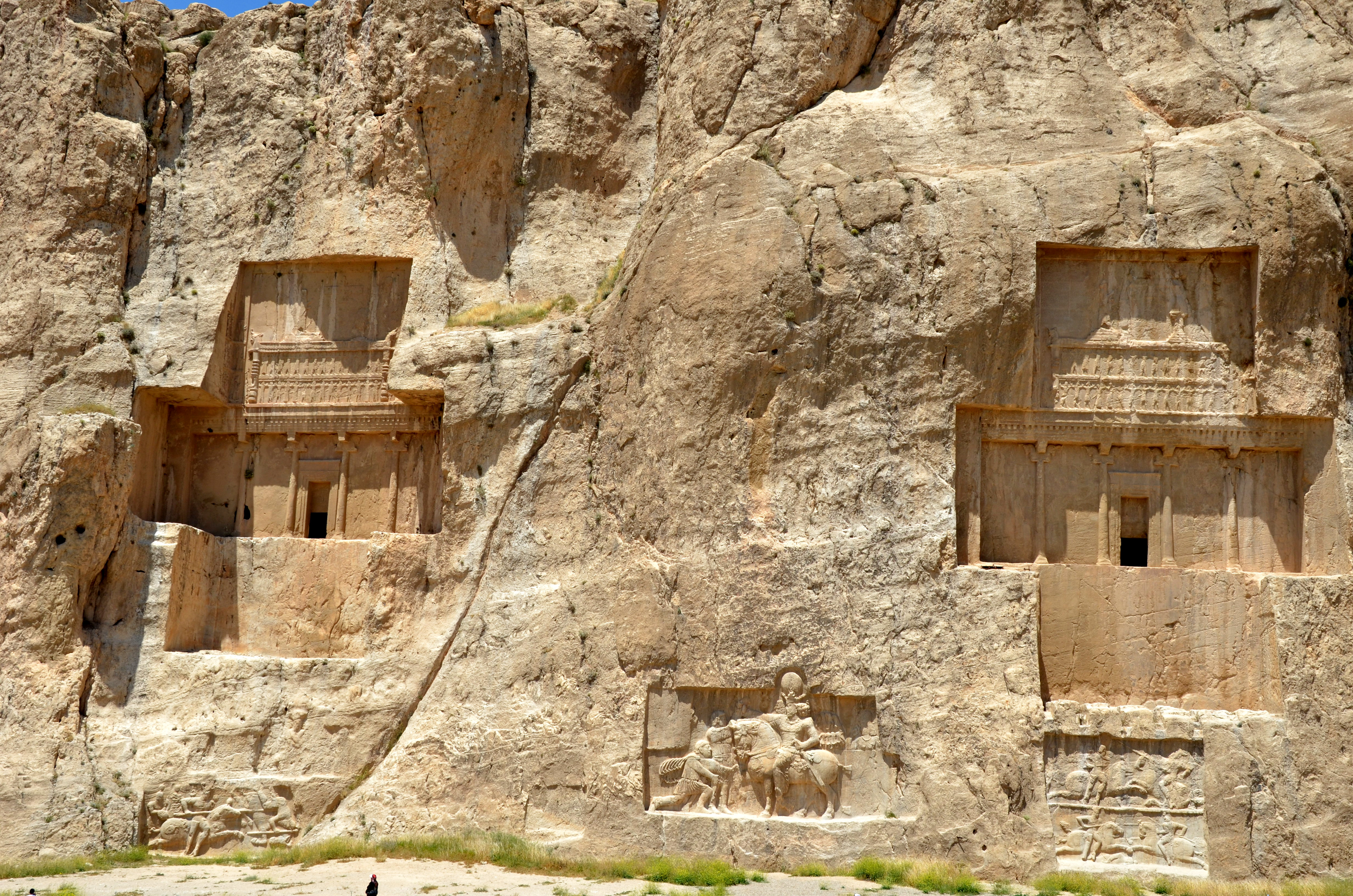

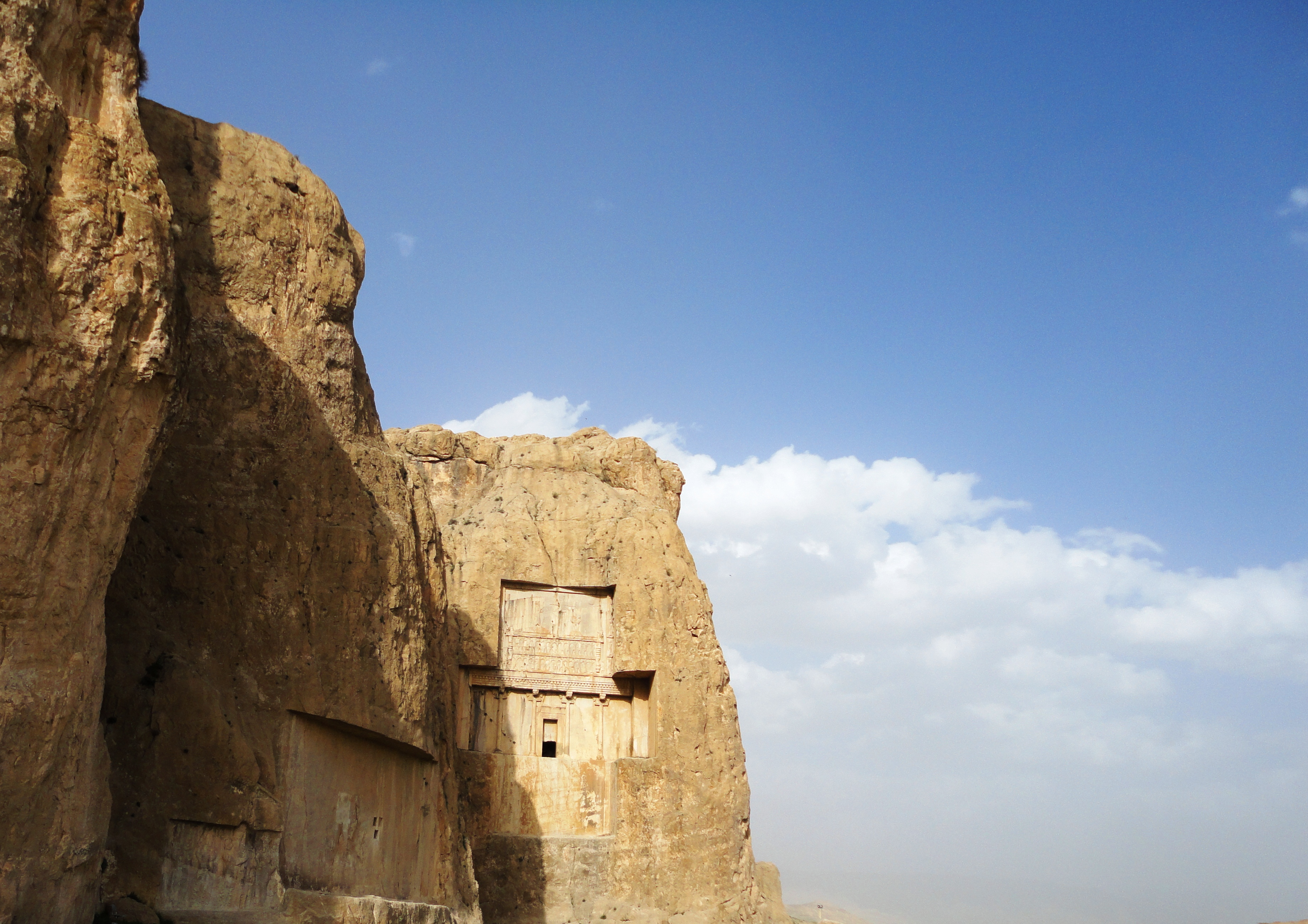

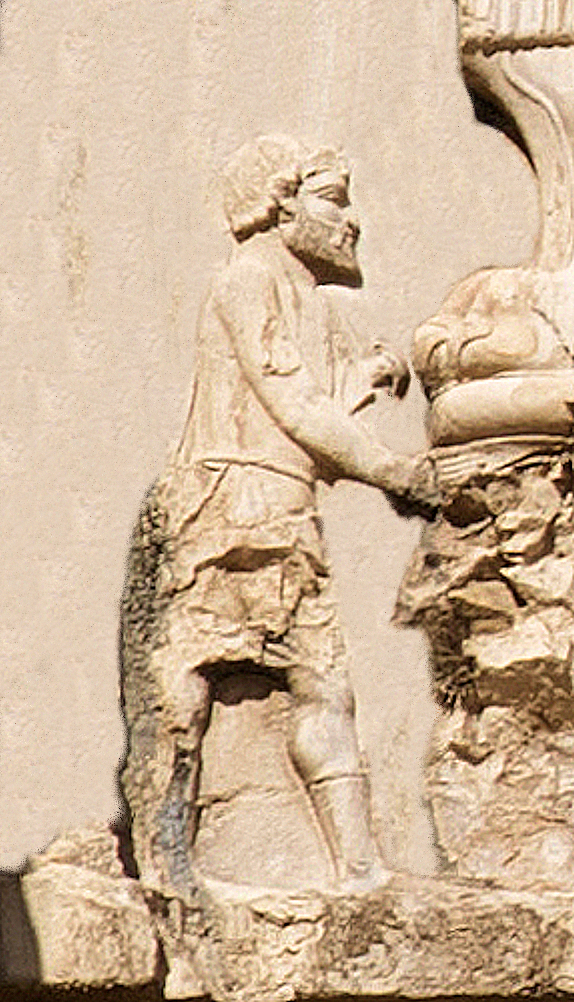

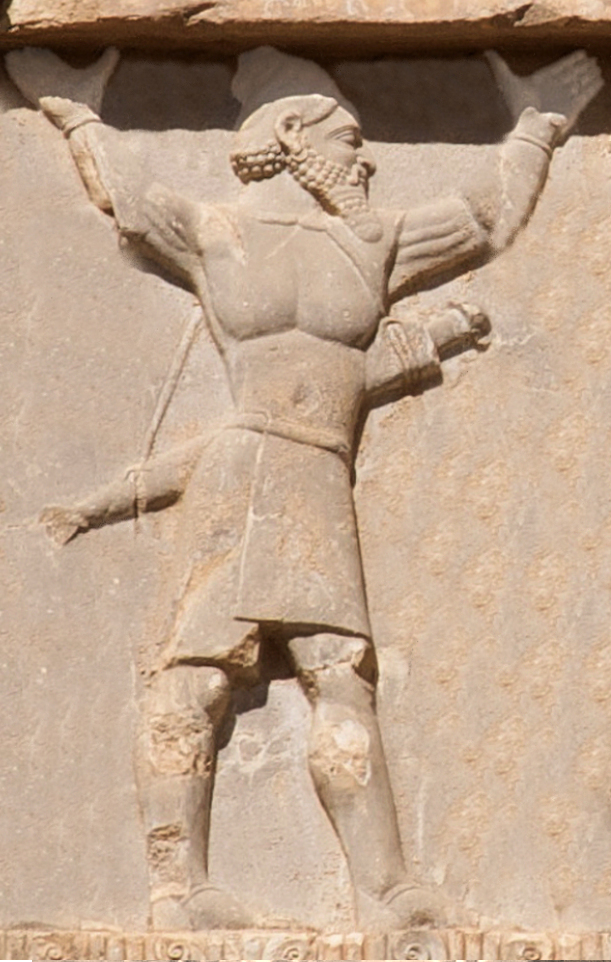

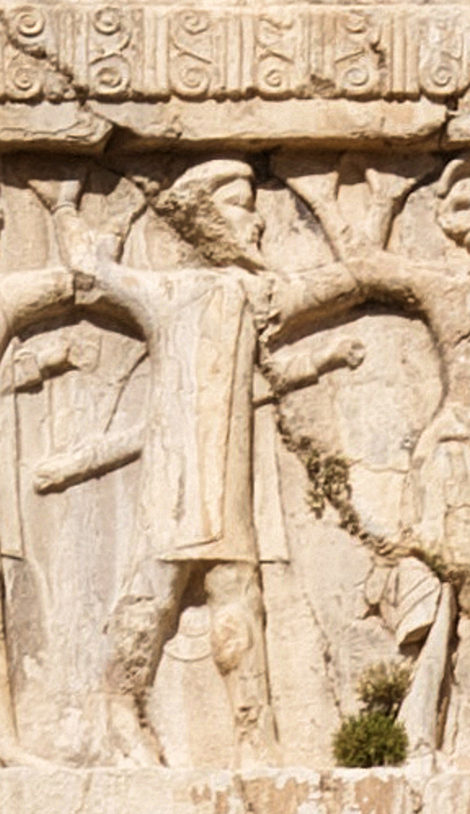

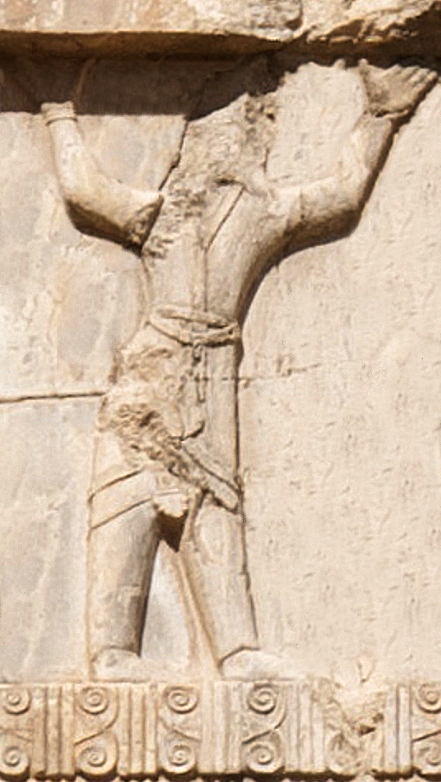

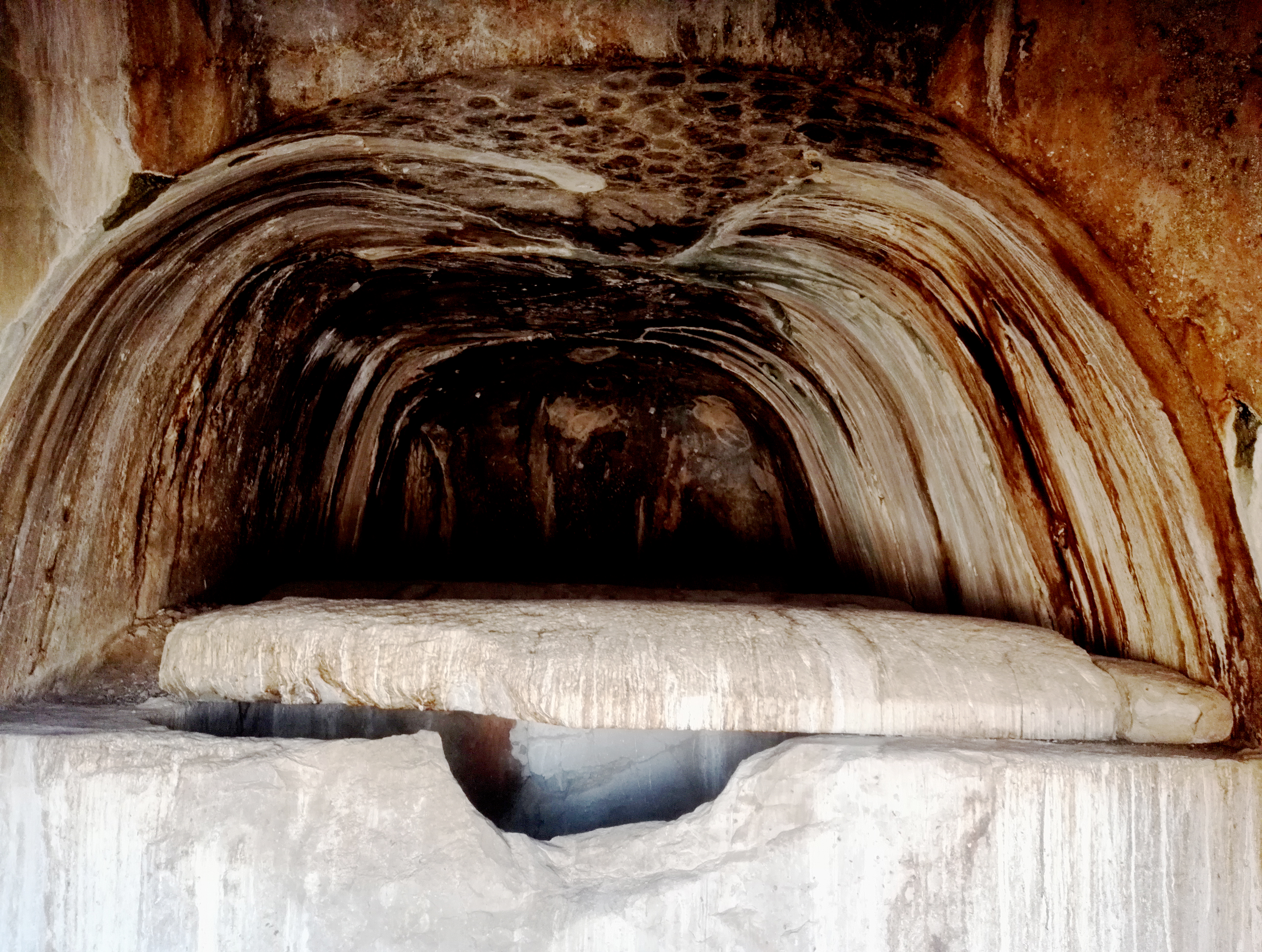
