= Tangestan =

Tangestan (Persian: تنگستان) may refer to:

- Tangestan, Fereydunshahr, Isfahan Province
- Tangestan, Nain, Isfahan Province
- Tangestan, Khuzestan
- Tangestan County, in Bushehr Province
