= Adur-Anahid =

3rd-century Sasanian noblewoman

Adur-Anahid (Middle Persian: 𐭠𐭲𐭲𐭲𐭲 𐭦𐭩 𐭲𐭲𐭲𐭲𐭩𐭲) was a high-ranking 3rd-century Iranian noblewoman from the royal Sasanian dynasty, who wielded the title of Queen of Queens (banbishnan banbishn). She was a daughter of the second Sasanian King of Kings of Iran, Shapur I (r. 240–270). She was one of the powerful queens of the Sasanian era and played a significant role in state affairs alongside Shapur I.

== Name ==
Her name is most likely a combination of adur ("fire") and the name of the Iranian goddess, Anahita. Originally thought to mean "Fire of Anahita", her name is now agreed to mean "Fire and Anahita".

== Political power ==
Ādur Anāhīd, daughter of Shapur I of the Sasanian dynasty, was one of the most capable and distinguished princesses of the Sasanian era. Ādur Anāhīd, daughter of Shapur I, held the title “Queen of Queens. It is certain that the highest rank attainable by women of the royal court was the title “Queen of Queens,” and a portion of this great royal dignity and magnificence was bestowed upon Ādur Anāhīd. Heinz considered this distinction granted to the princess to be scarcely believable. According to ancient writings, the memory of this great lady—who played a significant role in state affairs during the reign of Shapur I—has been preserved. According to a Sasanian tradition whereby sacred fires were kindled in fire temples for the soul and the perpetuation of the names of eminent individuals, Shapur I, as recorded in the inscription of the Kaʿba-ye Zartosht, established a fire in the name of his daughter Ādur Anāhīd and referred to her with the title “Queen of Queens.”

The mention of these women in the inscription of the Kaʿba-ye Zartosht was not based on their familial relationship to Shapur I, but rather on their social rank. Shapur’s statement therefore implies that his daughter Ādur Anāhīd held a higher social status than the other royal women and bore the title “Queen of Queens.” He further argues, in agreement with Wiesehöfer, that these titles cannot be taken as evidence for a xwēdōdah (close-kin marriage), since no reliable or sufficient proof exists in this regard. Instead, the bestowal of such titles reflects rank, status, and noble lineage. The name of this noble and eminent Iranian lady appears not only in the inscription of the Kaʿba-ye Zartosht—an important historical document—but also in other written and oral traditions, where she is consistently remembered with respect. It is said that Shapur I founded the ancient city of Bishapur, now a historical site, in her name and in honor of this great queen.

== Biography ==
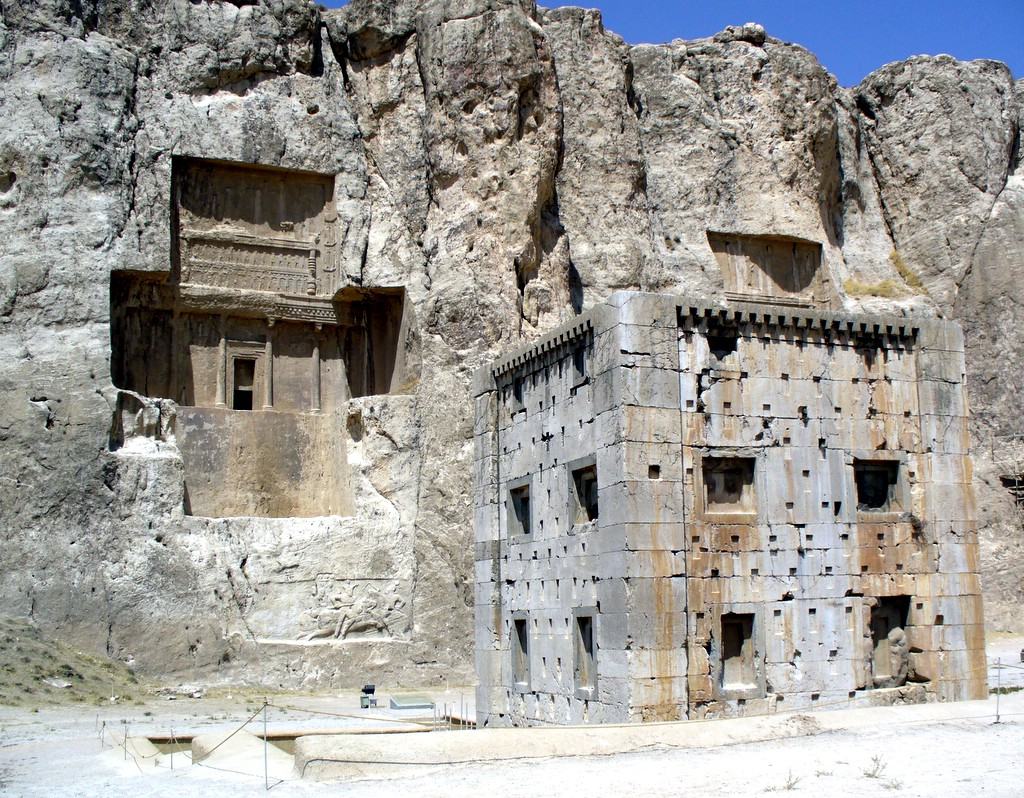
The Ka'ba-ye Zartosht, where the inscription of Shapur I is engraved

Adur-Anahid was a daughter of the second Sasanian King of Kings of Iran, Shapur I (r. 240–270). She is mentioned twice in an inscription on the wall of the Ka'ba-ye Zartosht at Naqsh-e Rostam near Persepolis in southern Iran, which Shapur I had created in c. 262. In the first paragraph, Shapur I claims to have ordered the establishment of fires for his daughter Adur-Anahid and three of his sons, Hormizd, Shapur, and Narseh. (Note: Adur-Anahid also had two other siblings named Shapurdukhtak and Bahram.) The fire established for Adur-Anahid was named Husraw-Adur-Anahid. In the second paragraph, Shapur I claims to have rewarded Adur-Anahid, along with princes and other high-ranking members of the court by ordering sacrifices in their names. Adur-Anahid is mentioned with the title of Queen of Queens (banbishnan banbishn) in the inscription.

The German Iranologist Walther Hinz has suggested that Adur-Anahid was the spouse of her father Shapur I, demonstrating the practice in Zoroastrianism of khwedodah, or close-kin marriage. However, this is opposed by other scholars, who have deduced that the title of members of the royal family illustrated their social status rather than family status. The title of "Queen" was wielded by all women of the royal Sasanian family, including the king's daughters and sisters, and the spouses of Sasanian princes. The title of Adur-Anahid thus demonstrated her status as the highest ranking woman in the court. There is no suggestion that she practiced kwedodah with her father. According to the modern historian Maria Brosius, "Analysis of the written evidence for the Sasanian period does not permit the conclusion that the Sasanian kings favored incestuous marriages."

== Sources ==
- Brosius, Maria (2000). "Women i. In Pre-Islamic Persia". In Yarshater, Ehsan (ed.). Encyclopædia Iranica (Online ed.). Encyclopædia Iranica Foundation.
- Gignoux, Ph. (1983). "Ādur-Anāhīd". In Yarshater, Ehsan (ed.). Encyclopædia Iranica. Vol. I/5: Adat–Afghanistan. London and New York: Routledge & Kegan Paul. p. 472. ISBN 978-0-71009-094-2.
- Rapp, Stephen H. (2014). The Sasanian World through Georgian Eyes: Caucasia and the Iranian Commonwealth in Late Antique Georgian Literature. Routledge. ISBN 978-1472425522.
- Shahbazi, A. Shapur (1988). "Bahrām I". In Yarshater, Ehsan (ed.). Encyclopædia Iranica. Vol. III/5: Bahai Faith III–Baḵtīārī tribe II. London and New York: Routledge & Kegan Paul. pp. 514–522. ISBN 978-0-71009-117-8.
- Spawforth, A. J. S. (2007). The Court and Court Society in Ancient Monarchies. Cambridge University Press. ISBN 9781139466639.
- Sundermann, W. (1988). "Bānbišn". In Yarshater, Ehsan (ed.). Encyclopædia Iranica. Vol. III/7: Banān–Bardesanes. London and New York: Routledge & Kegan Paul. pp. 678–679. ISBN 978-0-71009-119-2.
