= Murrod =

Sasanian queen and wife of king Ardashir I

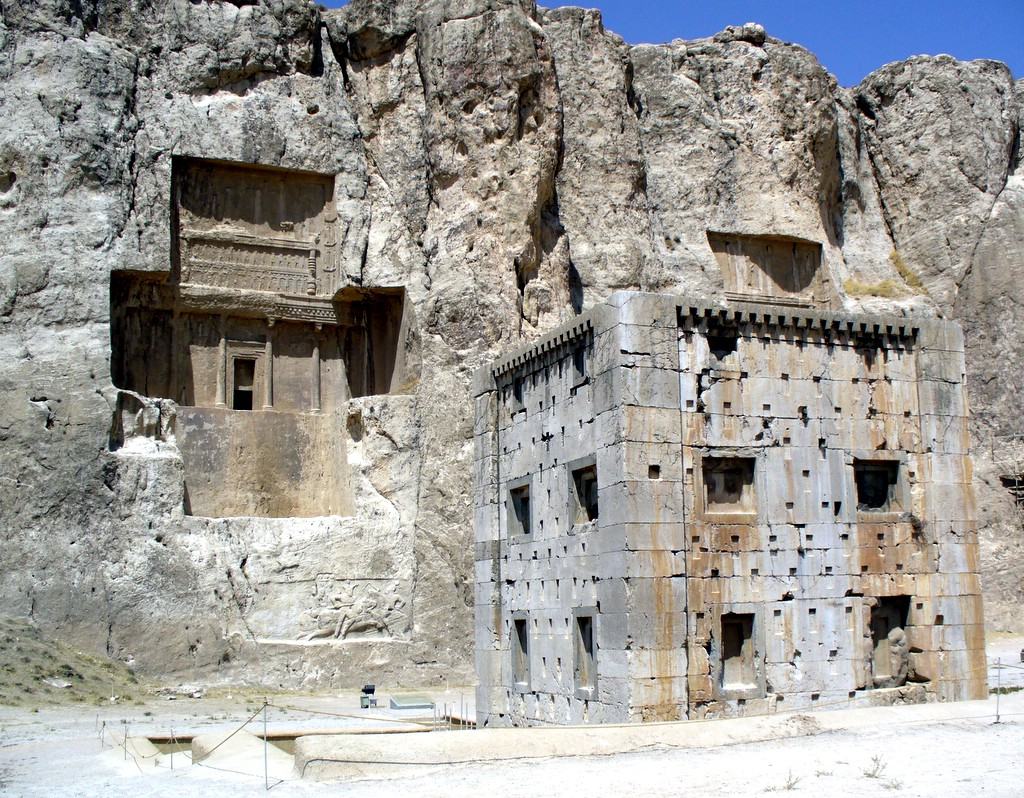
The Ka'ba-ye Zartosht, where the inscription of Shapur I is engraved

Murrod or Myrod (Middle Persian: Murrōd, New Persian: مورود) was a 3rd-century Sasanian queen (banbishn), the wife of the Sasanian king (shah) Ardashir I (r. 224–242) and mother of Sasanian king Shapur I (r. 242–270). She is mentioned in the inscription of Shapur I on the wall of the Ka'ba-ye Zartosht at Naqsh-e Rostam near Persepolis in southern Iran as “Lady Murrod, Mother of the King of Kings”. According to a legend, she was a Parthian princess and daughter of Artabanus IV of Parthia.

== Sources ==
- Brosius, Maria (2000). "WOMEN i. In Pre-Islamic Persia". Encyclopaedia Iranica, Vol. London et al.
- Shahbazi, A. Shapur (2002). "Šāpur I". Encyclopaedia Iranica.
