= Dad-windad =

Chief secretary to Parthian monarch, Artabanus IV (died 28 April 224)

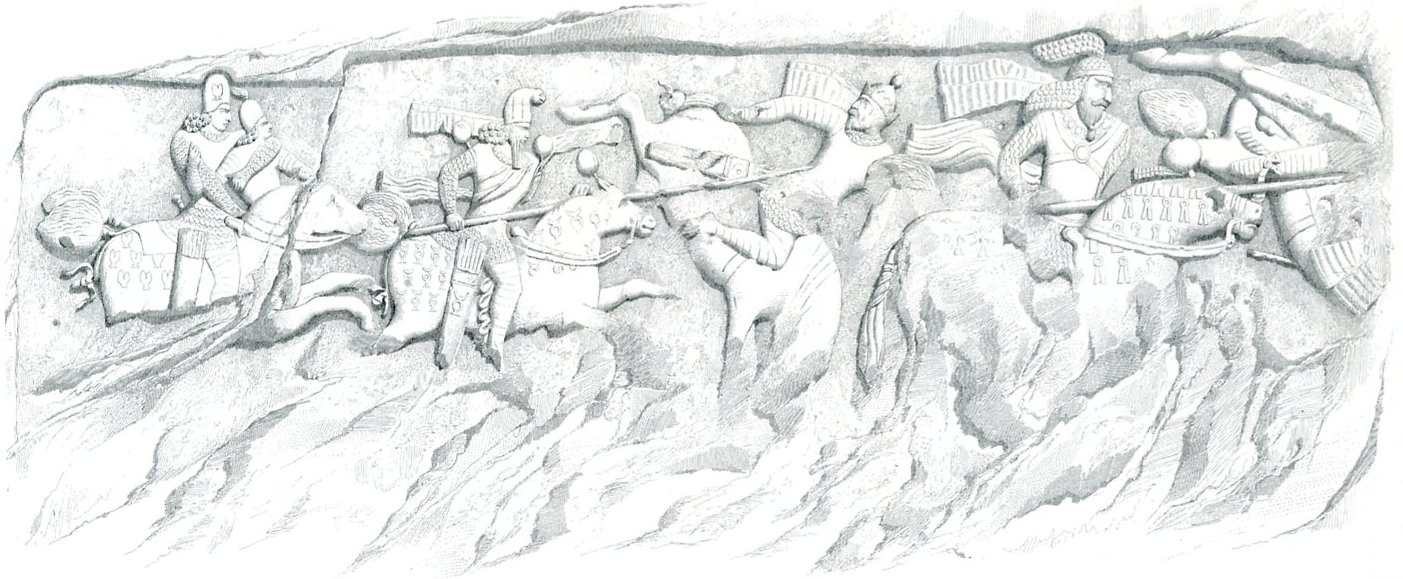
1840 illustration of a Sasanian relief at Firuzabad, celebrating Ardashir I's victory over Artabanus IV. On the relief, Ardashir is portrayed as riding on a horse whilst ousting Artabanus IV, who is also mounted. Ardashir I's son Shapur I, also on horseback, is portrayed as impaling Dad-windad with his lance.

Dad-windad (also spelled Dad-bendad) was a Parthian grandee, who served as the chief secretary (dabirbad) of the last Arsacid monarch, Artabanus IV (r. 213–224). He took part in the climactic battle of Hormozdgan in 224 between the Arsacid and Sasanian forces, which resulted in the defeat and death of Artabanus IV, with Dad-windad meeting his end shortly afterwards.

== Biography ==
Dad-windad served as the chief secretary, which was a powerful post but also a risky one, with the possibility of a harsh penalty or even death. On April 28 224, Dad-Windad took part in the climactic battle of Hormozdgan between the Arsacid and Sasanian forces. The forces of the Sasanian king Ardashir I numbered 10,000 cavalry, with some of them wearing flexible chain armor akin to that of the Romans. Artabanus IV led a greater number of soldiers, who, however, were less disposed, due to wearing the inconvenient lamellar armor. Ardashir's son and heir, Shapur I, as portrayed in the Sasanian rock reliefs, also took part in the battle. Artabanus IV was defeated and killed during the battle, which marked the end of the Parthian era and the start of 427-years of Sasanian rule. Dad-windad was afterwards executed by Ardashir I. Ardashir I celebrated his victory in a relief sculptured at his previous capital, Ardashir-Khwarrah (present-day Firuzabad) in his homeland, Pars. On the relief, Ardashir I is portrayed as riding on a horse whilst ousting Artabanus IV, who is also mounted. Ardashir I's son Shapur I, also on horseback, is portrayed as impaling Dad-windad with his lance.

== Sources ==
- Rajabzadeh, Hashem (1993). "Dabīr". Encyclopaedia Iranica, Vol. VI, Fasc. 5. pp. 534–539.
- Shahbazi, A. Shapur (2002). "Šāpur I". Encyclopaedia Iranica.
- Shahbazi, A. Shapur (2004). "Hormozdgān". Encyclopaedia Iranica, Vol. XII, Fasc. 5. pp. 469–470.
- Shahbazi, A. Shapur (2005). "SASANIAN DYNASTY". Encyclopaedia Iranica, Online Edition.
