= Shapur I =

Shahanshah of the Sasanian Empire from 240 to 270

Shapur I the Great 𐭱𐭧𐭯𐭥𐭧𐭥𐭩
- King of Kings of Iranians and non-Iranians
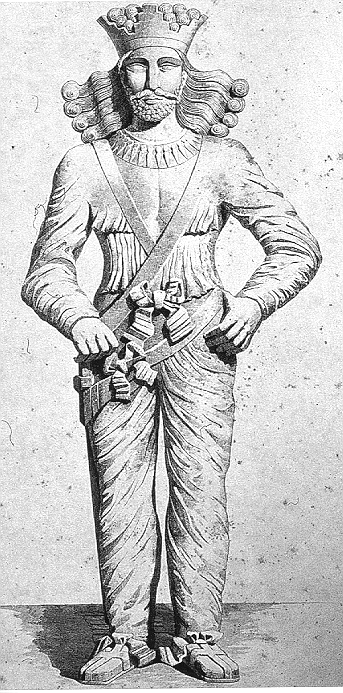
- Illustrated reconstruction of the Colossal Statue of Shapur I by George Rawlinson, 1876

Shahanshah of the Sasanian Empire
- Reign: 12 April 240 – May 270
- Predecessor: Ardashir I
- Successor: Hormizd I
- Died: May 270; Bishapur
- Consort: Khwarranzem al-Nadirah (?)
- Issue: Bahram I Shapur Mishanshah; Hormizd I Narseh; Shapurdukhtak (?); Adur-Anahid
- House: House of Sasan
- Father: Ardashir I
- Mother: Murrod or Denag
- Religion: Zoroastrianism

Shapur I (also spelled Shabuhr I; Middle Persian: 𐭱𐭧𐭯𐭥𐭧𐭥𐭩, romanized: Šābuhr) also known as Shapur I the Great was the second Sasanian King of Kings of Iran. The precise dating of his reign is disputed, but it is generally agreed that he ruled from 240 to 270, with his father Ardashir I as co-regent until the death of the latter in 242. Shapur also consolidated and expanded the empire of Ardashir I, waged war against the Roman Empire, and seized its cities of Nisibis and Carrhae while he was advancing as far as Roman Syria. Although he was defeated at the Battle of Resaena in 243 by Roman emperor Gordian III (r. 238–244), the following year he was able to win the Battle of Misiche and force the new Roman emperor Philip the Arab (r. 244–249) to sign a favorable peace treaty that was regarded by the Romans as "a most shameful treaty".

Shapur later took advantage of the political turmoil within the Roman Empire by undertaking a second expedition against it in 252/3–256, sacking the cities of Antioch and Dura-Europos. In 260, during his third campaign, he defeated and captured the Roman emperor, Valerian. He did not seem interested in permanently occupying the Roman provinces, choosing instead to resort to plundering and pillaging, gaining vast amounts of riches. The captives of Antioch, for example, were allocated to the newly reconstructed city of Gundeshapur, later famous as a center of scholarship. In the 260s, subordinates of Shapur suffered setbacks against Odaenathus, the king of Palmyra. According to Shapur's inscription at Hajiabad, he still remained active at the court in his later years, participating in archery. He died of illness in Bishapur, most likely in May 270.

Shapur was the first Iranian monarch to use the title of "King of Kings of Iranians and non-Iranians"; beforehand the royal titulary had been "King of Kings of Iranians". He had adopted the title due to the influx of Roman subjects whom he had deported during his campaigns. However, it was first under his son and successor Hormizd I, that the title became regularized. Shapur had new Zoroastrian fire temples constructed, incorporated new elements into the faith from Greek and Indian sources, and conducted an extensive program of rebuilding and refounding of cities. He was also tolerant of Manichaeism, a new religious movement founded during his time by the prophet Mani.

== Name ==
Shapur was a popular name in Sasanian Iran, being used by three Sasanian monarchs and other notables during and after the Sasanian era. Derived from Old Iranian *xšayaθiya.puθra 'son of a king', it must initially have been a title, which became—at least in the late 2nd century AD—a personal name. It appears in the list of Arsacid kings in some Arabic-Persian sources; however, this is anachronistic. Shapur is transliterated in other languages as; Greek Sapur, Sabour and Sapuris; Latin Sapores and Sapor; Arabic Sābur and Šābur; New Persian Šāpur, Šāhpur, Šahfur.

== Birth ==
According to the semi-legendary Kar-Namag i Ardashir i Pabagan, a Middle Persian biography of Ardashir I, the daughter of the Parthian king Artabanus IV, Zijanak, attempted to poison her husband Ardashir. Discovering her intentions, Ardashir ordered her to be executed. Finding out about her pregnancy, the mobads (priests) were against it. Nevertheless, Ardashir still demanded her execution, which led the mobads to conceal her and her son Shapur for seven years, until the latter was identified by Ardashir, who chose to adopt him based on his virtuous traits. This type of narrative is repeated in Iranian historiography. According to 5th-century BCE Greek historian Herodotus, the Median king Astyages wanted to have his grandson Cyrus killed because he believed that he would one day overthrow him. A similar narrative is also found in the story of the mythological Iranian king Kay Khosrow. According to the modern historian Michael Bonner, this story of Shapur's birth "may conceal a marriage between Ardashir and an Arsacid princess or perhaps merely a noble lady connected with the Parthian aristocracy." According to A. Shapur Shahbazi, this is one of several stories meant to legitimize Sasanian role by connecting Ardashir and his successors with the Parthian nobility. In the tale, the birth of Shapur to Zijanak takes place after the overthrow of Artabanus, but C. E. Bosworth states that Shapur I must have been born "well before" this event (i.e., before 224); the Sasanian rock reliefs and the history of al-Tabari indicate that Shapur took part in Ardashir's battles against the Parthians. In his inscriptions, Shapur identifies his mother as a certain Murrod.

== Background and state of Iran ==
Shapur I was a son of Ardashir I and his wife Murrod or Denag. The background of the Sasanian family is obscure; although based in Pars (also known as Persis), they were not native to the area, and were seemingly originally from the east. The historian Marek Jan Olbrycht has suggested that the family was descended from the Indo-Parthians of Sakastan. Iranologist Khodadad Rezakhani also noted similarities between the early Sasanians and the Indo-Parthians, such as their coinage. Yet, he stated that "evidence might still be too inconclusive."

Pars, a region in the southwestern Iranian plateau, was the homeland of the southwestern branch of the Iranian peoples, the Persians. It was also the birthplace of the first Iranian Empire, the Achaemenids. The region served as the center of the empire until its conquest by the Macedonian king Alexander the Great (r. 336–323 BCE). Since the end of the 3rd or the beginning of the 2nd century BCE, Pars was ruled by local dynasts subject to the Hellenistic Seleucid Empire. These dynasts held the ancient Persian title of frataraka ("leader, governor, forerunner"), which is also attested in the Achaemenid-era. Later under the frataraka Wadfradad II (fl. 138 BCE) was made a vassal of the Iranian Parthian (Arsacid) Empire. The frataraka were shortly afterwards replaced by the Kings of Persis, most likely at the accession of the Arsacid monarch Phraates II (r. 132–127 BCE). Unlike the fratarakas, the Kings of Persis used the title of shah ("king"), and laid foundations to a new dynasty, which may be labelled the Darayanids.

Under Vologases V (r. 191–208), the Parthian Empire was in decline, due to wars with the Romans, civil wars and regional revolts. The Roman emperor Septimius Severus (r. 193–211) had invaded the Parthian domains in 196, and two years later did the same, this time sacking the Parthian capital of Ctesiphon. At the same time, revolts occurred in Media and Persis. The Iranologist Touraj Daryaee argues that the reign of Vologases V was "the turning point in Parthian history, in that the dynasty lost much of its prestige." The kings of Persis were now unable to depend on their weakened Parthian overlords. Indeed, in 205/6, Pabag rebelled and overthrew the Bazrangid ruler of Persis, Gochihr, taking Istakhr for himself. Around 208 Vologases VI succeeded his father Vologases V as king of the Arsacid Empire. He ruled as the uncontested king from 208 to 213, but afterwards fell into a dynastic struggle with his brother Artabanus IV, (Note: Artabanus IV is erroneously known in older scholarship as Artabanus V. For further information, see Schippmann (1986a, pp. 647–650)) who by 216 was in control of most of the empire, even being acknowledged as the supreme ruler by the Roman Empire. Artabanus IV soon clashed with the Roman emperor Caracalla, whose forces he managed to contain at Nisibis in 217.

Peace was made between the two empires the following year, with the Arsacids keeping most of Mesopotamia. However, Artabanus IV still had to deal with his brother Vologases VI, who continued to mint coins and challenge him. The Sasanian family had meanwhile quickly risen to prominence in Pars, and had now under Ardashir begun to conquer the neighboring regions and more far territories, such as Kirman. At first, Ardashir I's activities did not alarm Artabanus IV, until later, when the Arsacid king finally chose to confront him.

== Early life and co-rule ==
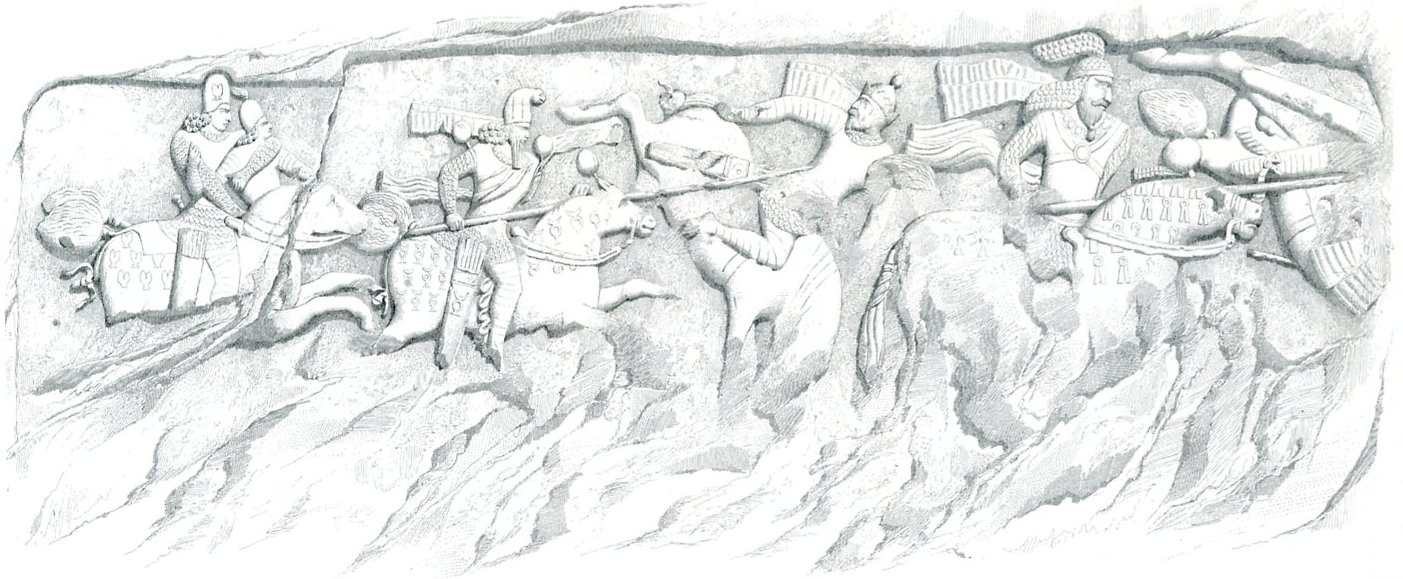
1840 illustration of a Sasanian relief at Firuzabad, showing Ardashir I's victory over Artabanus IV and his forces.

Shapur, as portrayed in the Sasanian rock reliefs, took part in his father's war with the Arsacids, including the Battle of Hormozdgan. The battle was fought on 28 April 224, with Artabanus IV being defeated and killed, marking the end of the Arsacid era and the start of 427 years of Sasanian rule. The chief secretary of the deceased Arsacid king, Dad-windad, was afterwards executed by Ardashir I. Ardashir celebrated his victory by having two rock reliefs sculptured at the Sasanian royal city of Ardashir-Khwarrah (present-day Firuzabad) in Pars. The first relief portrays three scenes of personal fighting; starting from the left, a Persian aristocrat seizing a Parthian soldier; Shapur impaling the Parthian minister Dad-windad with his lance; and Ardashir I ousting Artabanus IV. The second relief, conceivably intended to portray the aftermath of the battle, displays the triumphant Ardashir I being given the badge of kingship over a fire shrine from the Zoroastrian supreme god Ahura Mazda, while Shapur and two other princes are watching from behind. Ardashir considered Shapur "the gentlest, wisest, bravest and ablest of all his children" and nominated him as his successor in a council amongst the magnates. Shapur was crowned co-ruler of the empire on 12 April 240. He may have been crowned again as sole ruler in 243, but Richard N. Frye writes that a single coronation in 240 is more likely.

== Military career ==
=== The eastern front ===
The eastern provinces of the fledgling Sasanian Empire bordered on the land of the Kushans and the land of the Sakas (roughly today's Turkmenistan, Afghanistan and Pakistan). The military operations of Shapur's father Ardashir I had led to the local Kushan and Saka kings offering tribute to the Sasanians. Satisfied by this show of submission, Ardashir seems to have refrained from occupying their territories. Al-Tabari alleges that he rebuilt the ancient city of Zrang in Sakastan (the land of the Sakas, Sistan), but the only founding of a new Sasanian settlement in the east which is certain in this period is the building by Shapur I of Nishapur—"Beautiful (city built) by Shapur"—in Dihistan (former Parthia, apparently lost by the Parthians to the Kushans).

Soon after the death of his father in 241 AD, Shapur felt the need to cut short the campaign they had started in Roman Syria and reassert Sasanian authority in the East, perhaps because the Kushan and Saka kings were lax in abiding by their tributary status. However, he first had to fight "The Medes of the Mountains"—possibly in the mountain range of Gilan on the Caspian coast—and after subjugating them, he appointed his son Bahram (the later Bahram I) as their king. He then marched to the East and annexed most of the land of the Kushans, and appointing his son Narseh as Sakanshah—king of the Sakas—in Sistan. In 242 AD, Shapur conquered khwarezm. Shapur could now proudly proclaim that his empire stretched all the way to Peshawar, and his relief in Rag-i-Bibi in present-day Afghanistan confirms this claim. Shapur I claims in his Naqsh-e Rostam inscription possession of the territory of the Kushans (Kūšān šahr) as far as "Purushapura" (Peshawar), suggesting he controlled Bactria and areas as far as the Hindu-Kush or even south of it:

I, the Mazda-worshipping lord, Shapur, king of kings of Iran and An-Iran… (I) am the Master of the Domain of Iran (Ērānšahr) and possess the territory of Persis, Parthian… Hindestan, the Domain of the Kushan up to the limits of Paškabur and up to Kash, Sughd, and Chachestan.

— Naqsh-e Rostam inscription of Shapur I

He seems to have garrisoned the Eastern territories with prisoners of war from his previous campaign against the Medes of the Mountains. Agathias claims Bahram II (274–293 AD) later campaigned in the land of the Sakas and appointed his brother Hormizd as its king. When Hormizd revolted, the Panegyrici Latini list his forces as the Sacci (Sakas), the Rufii (Cusii/Kushans) and the Geli (Gelans / Gilaks, the inhabitants of Gilan). Since the Gilaks are obviously out of place among these easterners, and as we know that Shapur I had to fight the Medes of the Mountains first before marching to the land of the Kushans, it is conceivable those Gilaks were the descendants of warriors captured during Shapur I's North-western campaign, forcibly drafted into the Sasanian army, and settled as a hereditary garrison in Merv, Nishapur, or Zrang after the conclusion of Shapur's north-eastern campaign, the usual Sasanian practice with prisoners of war. In 262, Shapur burned the Kushan cities of Begram and Taxila.

=== Roman campaigns ===
Map showing the Roman-Sasanian borders after the peace treaty in 244

Towards the end of his reign, Ardashir I had renewed the war against the Roman Empire, and Shapur I had conquered the Mesopotamian fortresses Nisibis and Carrhae and had advanced into Syria. In 242, the Romans under the father-in-law of their child-emperor Gordian III set out against the Sasanians with "a huge army and great quantity of gold" (according to a Sasanian rock relief), and wintered in Antioch, while Shapur was occupied with subduing Gilan, Khorasan, and Sistan. There the Roman general Timesitheus fought against the Sasanians and won repeated battles, and recaptured Carrhae and Nisibis, and at last routed a Sasanian army at Resaena, forcing the Persians to restore all occupied cities unharmed to their subjects. "We have penetrated as far as Nisibis, and shall even get to Ctesiphon," the young emperor Gordian III, who had joined his father-in-law Timesitheus, exultantly wrote to the Senate.

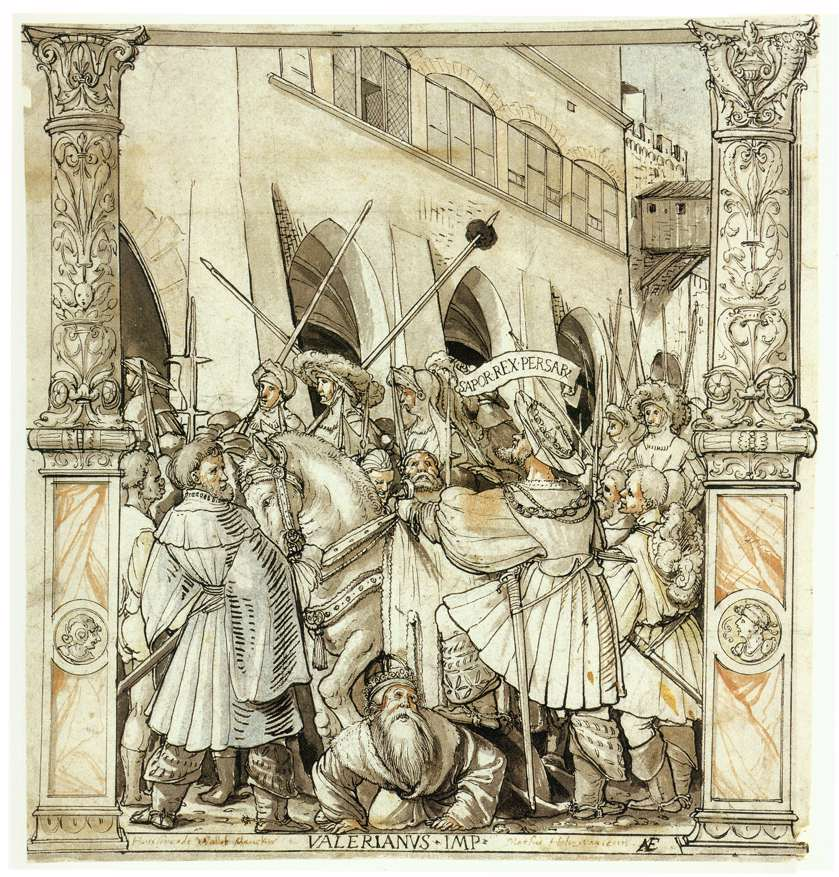
The Humiliation of Emperor Valerian by Shapur I, pen and ink, Hans Holbein the Younger, ca. 1521. At the time it was made, the above rock-face relief was unknown in the west.

The Romans later invaded eastern Mesopotamia but faced tough resistance from Shapur I who returned from the East. After Gordian III ascended to the throne, the young emperor went to the Battle of Misiche and was either killed in the battle or murdered by the Romans after the defeat. The Romans then chose Philip the Arab as Emperor. Philip was not willing to repeat the mistakes of previous claimants and was aware that he had to return to Rome to secure his position with the Senate. Philip concluded a peace with Shapur I in 244; he had agreed that Armenia lay within Persia's sphere of influence. He also had to pay an enormous indemnity to the Persians of 500,000 gold denarii. Philip immediately issued coins proclaiming that he had made peace with the Persians (pax fundata cum Persis). Shapur I commemorated this victory on several rock reliefs in Pars.

Philip later broke the treaty and seized lost territory, Shapur I invaded Mesopotamia in 250 but again, serious trouble arose in Khorasan and Shapur I had to march over there and settle its affair.

Having settled the affair in Khorasan he resumed the invasion of Roman territories, and later annihilated a Roman force of 60,000 at the Battle of Barbalissos. He then burned and ravaged the Roman province of Syria and all its dependencies.

Shapur I then reconquered Armenia, and incited Anak the Parthian to murder the king of Armenia, Khosrov II. Anak did as Shapur asked, and had Khosrov murdered in 258; yet Anak himself was shortly thereafter murdered by Armenian nobles. Shapur then appointed his son Hormizd I as the "Great King of Armenia". With Armenia subjugated, Georgia submitted to the Sasanian Empire and fell under the supervision of a Sasanian official. With Georgia and Armenia under control, the Sasanians' borders on the north were thus secured.

During Shapur's invasion of Syria he captured important Roman cities like Antioch. The emperor Valerian (253–260) marched against him and by 257 Valerian had recovered Antioch and returned the province of Syria to Roman control. The speedy retreat of Shapur's troops caused Valerian to pursue the Persians to Edessa, but they were defeated, and Valerian, along with the Roman army that was left, was captured by Shapur Shapur then advanced into Asia Minor and managed to capture Caesarea, deporting hundred upon thousands of Roman subjects to the Sasanian empire. He used these captive Roman subjects to build a dyke near Shushtar, called "Caesar's dyke".

Shapur then advanced into Anatolia, but was defeated by Roman forces led by praetorian prefect Balista; attacks by Septimius Odaenathus of Palmyra forced the Persians to withdraw from Roman territory, surrendering Cappadocia and Antioch. Between 262 and 267 AD, the Romans and their Palmyrene allies launched systematic campaigns into Persian territory, reconquering the strategic cities of Nisibis, Edessa, and Carrhae and all of Roman Mesopotamia, perhaps even occupying Armenia.

== Interactions with the Jews ==
Shapur is mentioned many times in the Talmud, in which he is referred to in Jewish Aramaic as Shabur Malka (שבור מלכא), meaning "King Shapur". He had good relations with the Jewish community and was a friend of Shmuel, one of the most famous of the Babylonian Amoraim, the Talmudic sages from among the important Jewish communities of Mesopotamia.

== Roman prisoners of war ==
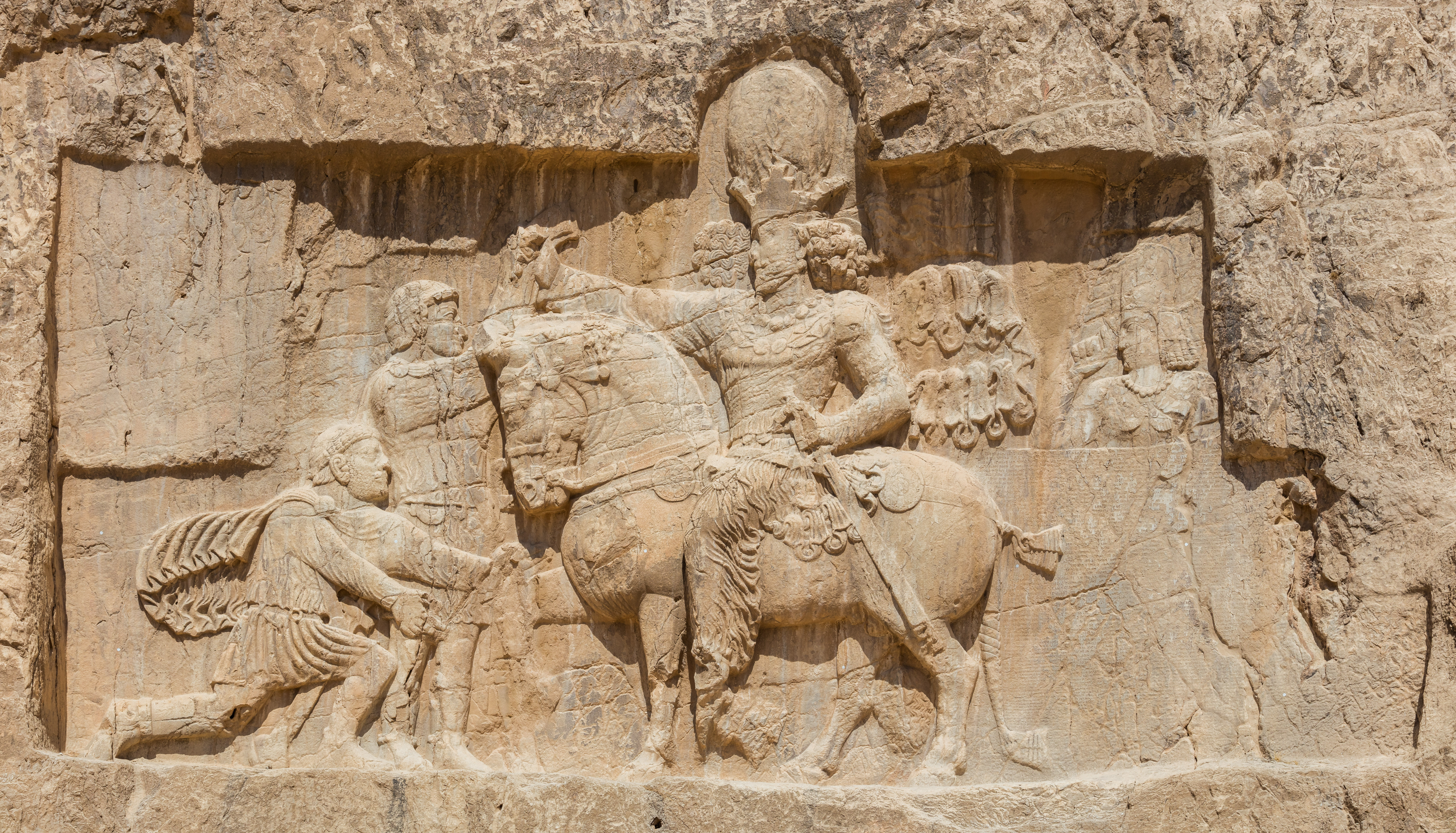
Rock-face relief at Naqsh-e Rostam of Shapur (on horseback) with Philip the Arab and Emperor Valerian

Shapur's campaigns deprived the Roman Empire of resources while restoring and substantially enriching his own treasury, by deporting many Roman subjects from conquered cities in Syria and Mesopotamia to Sasanian provinces like Khuzestan, Asuristan, and Pars. This influx of deported artisans and skilled workers revitalised Iran's domestic commerce.

The victory over Valerian is presented in a mural at Naqsh-e Rustam, where Shapur is represented on horseback wearing royal armor and a crown. Before him kneels a man in Roman dress, asking for grace. The same scene is repeated in other rock-face inscriptions. Christian tradition has Shapur I humiliating Valerian, infamous for his persecution of Christians, by the King of Kings using the Emperor as a footstool to mount his horse, and they claim he later died a miserable death in captivity at the hands of the enemy. However, just as with the above-mentioned Gilaks deported to the East by Shapur, the Persian treatment of prisoners of war was unpleasant but honorable, drafting the captured Romans and their Emperor into their army and deporting them to a remote place, Bishapur in Khuzistan, where they were settled as a garrison and built a weir with bridge for Shapur.

== Death ==
In May 270, Shapur died of an illness while in Bishapur. He was succeeded by his son, Hormizd I. Two of his other sons, Bahram I and Narseh, would also become kings of the Sasanian Empire, while another son, Shapur Meshanshah, who died before Shapur, sired children who would hold exalted positions within the empire.

== Government ==
=== Governors during his reign ===
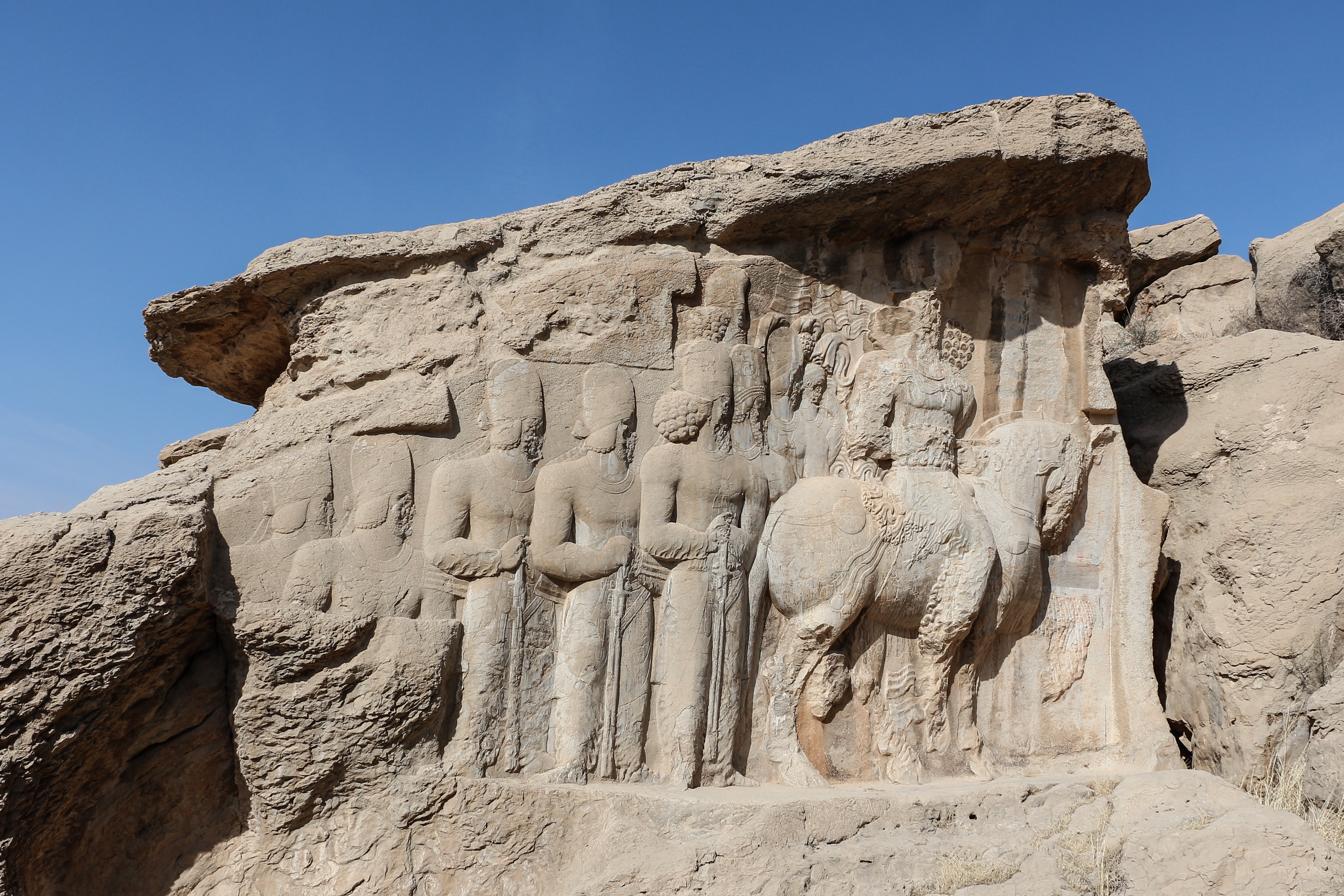
Relief showing Shapur I on horseback, followed by his sons and nobles

Under Shapur, the Sasanian court, including its territories, were much larger than that of his father. Several governors and vassal-kings are mentioned in his inscriptions; Ardashir, governor of Qom; Varzin, governor of Spahan; Tiyanik, governor of Hamadan; Ardashir, governor of Neriz; Narseh, governor of Rind; Friyek, governor of Gundishapur; Rastak, governor of Veh-Ardashir; Amazasp III, king of Iberia. Under Shapur several of his relatives and sons served as governor of Sasanian provinces; Bahram, governor of Gilan; Narseh, governor of Sindh, Sakastan and Turan; Ardashir, governor of Kirman; Hormizd-Ardashir, governor of Armenia; Shapur Meshanshah, governor of Meshan; Ardashir, governor of Adiabene.

=== Officials during his reign ===
Several names of Shapur's officials are carved on his inscription at Naqsh-e Rustam. Many of these were the offspring of the officials who served Shapur's father. During the reign of Shapur, a certain Papak served as the commander of the royal guard (hazarbed), while Peroz served as the chief of the cavalry (aspbed); Vahunam and Shapur served as the director of the clergy; Kirdisro served as viceroy of the empire (bidaxsh); Vardbad served as the "chief of services"; Hormizd served as the chief scribe; Naduk served as "the chief of the prison"; Papak served as the "gate keeper"; Mihrkhwast served as the treasurer; Shapur served as the commander of the army; Arshtat Mihran served as the secretary; Zik served as the "master of ceremonies".

=== Army ===
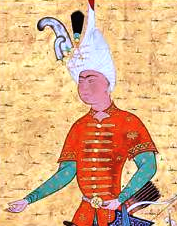
Shapur I in the Shahnameh of Shah Tahmasp

Under Shapur, the Iranian military experienced a resurgence after a rather long decline in the 2nd and 3rd centuries, which gave the Romans the opportunity to undertake expeditions into the Near East and Mesopotamia during the end of the Parthian Empire. Yet, the military was essentially the same as that of the Parthians; the same Parthians nobles who served the Arsacid royal family, now served the Sasanians, forming the majority of the Sasanian army. However, the Sasanians seem to have employed more cataphracts who were equipped with lighter chain-mail armor resembling that of the Romans.

Although Iranian society was greatly militarized and its elite designated themselves as a "warrior nobility" (arteshtaran), it still had a significantly smaller population, was more impoverished, and was a less centralized state compared to the Roman Empire. As a result, the Sasanian shahs had access to fewer full-time fighters, and depended on recruits from the nobility instead. Some exceptions were the royal cavalry bodyguard, garrison soldiers, and units recruited from places outside Iran. The bulk of the nobility included the powerful Parthian noble families (known as the wuzurgan) that were centered on the Iranian plateau. They served as the backbone of the Sasanian feudal army and were largely autonomous. The Parthian nobility worked for the Sasanian shah for personal benefit, personal oath, and, conceivably, a common awareness of the "Aryan" (Iranian) kinship they shared with their Persian overlords.

Use of war elephants is also attested under Shapur, who made use of them to demolish the city of Hatra. He may also have used them against Valerian, as attested in the Shahnameh (The Book of Kings).

=== Monuments ===
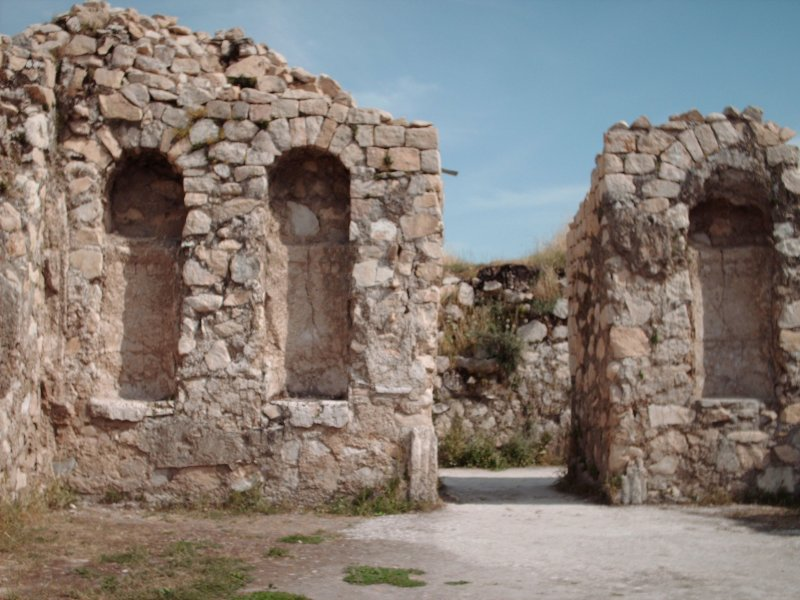
Picture of the ruined palace of Shapur I at Bishapur

Shapur I left other reliefs and rock inscriptions. A relief at Naqsh-e Rajab near Estakhr is accompanied by a Greek translation. Here Shapur I calls himself "the Mazdayasnan (worshipper of Ahuramazda), the divine Shapur, King of Kings of the Iranians, and non-Iranians, of divine descent, son of the Mazdayasnan, the divine Ardashir, King of Kings of the Aryans, grandson of the divine king Papak". Another long inscription at Estakhr mentions the King's exploits in archery in the presence of his nobles.

From his titles we learn that Shapur I claimed sovereignty over the whole earth, although in reality his domain extended little farther than that of Ardashir I. Shapur I built the great town Gundishapur near the old Achaemenid capital Susa, and increased the fertility of the district with a dam and irrigation system—built by Roman prisoners—that redirected part of the Karun River. The barrier is still called Band-e Kaisar, "the mole of the Caesar". He is also responsible for building the city of Bishapur, with the labors of Roman soldiers captured after the defeat of Valerian in 260. Shapur also built a town named Pushang in Khorasan.

The Colossal Statue of Shapur I, which stands in the Shapur Cave, is one of the most impressive sculptures of the Sasanian Empire.

=== Religious policy ===
In all records Shapur calls himself mzdysn ("Mazda-worshipping"). His inscription at the Ka'ba-ye Zartosht recounts his wars and religious establishments to the same extent. He believed that he had a responsibility; "For the reason, therefore, that the gods have so made us their instrument (dstkrt), and that by the help of the gods we have sought out for ourselves, and hold, all these nations (štry) for that reason we have also founded, province by province, many Varahrān fires (ʾtwry wlhlʾn), and we have dealt piously with many Magi (mowmard), and we have made great worship of the gods." According to the Zoroastrian priest Kartir, Shapur treated the Zoroastrians generously, and permitted members of their clergy to follow him on his expeditions against the Romans. According to the historian Prods Oktor Skjærvø, Shapur was a "lukewarm Zoroastrian". According to the 10th century Denkard, Shapur collected writings from Hindustan and Byzantium relating to medicine, astronomy, geography, minerals, the increase of the glory of the life-possessing kinds, the parts of the soul, and writings relating to other arts and sciences.

During the reign of Shapur, Manichaeism, a new religion founded by the Iranian prophet Mani, flourished. Mani was treated well by Shapur, and in 242, the prophet joined the Sasanian court, where he tried to convert Shapur by dedicating his only work written in Middle Persian, known as the Shabuhragan. Shapur, however, did not convert to Manichaeism and remained a Zoroastrian.

== Coinage and imperial ideology ==
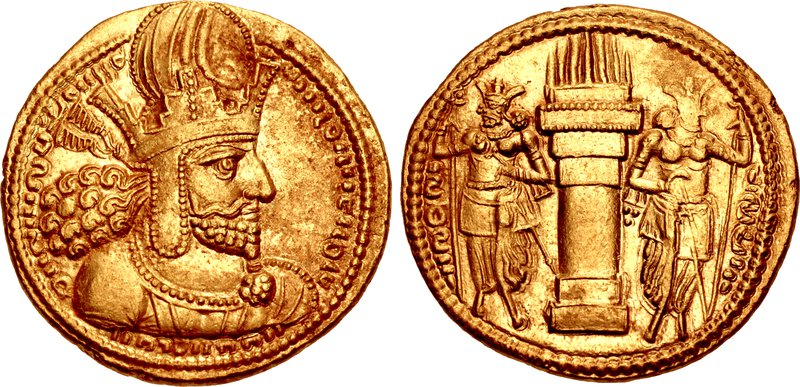
Gold dinar of Shapur I, minted at Ctesiphon

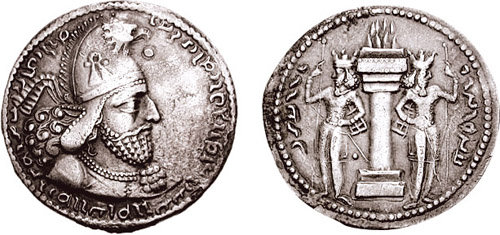
Drachma of Shapur wearing an eagle-headed crown

While Ardashir used the title "King of Kings of Iran(ians)", Shapur slightly changed it, adding the phrase "and non-Iran(ians)". The extended title demonstrates the incorporation of new territory into the empire; however, what was precisely seen as "non-Iran(ian)" (aneran) is not certain. Although this new title was used on his inscriptions, it was almost never used on his coinage. The title first became regularized under Hormizd I.

== See also ==
- Shapur I's first Roman campaign
- Shapour I's inscription in Ka'ba-ye Zartosht
- Shapour I's inscription in Naqsh-e Rostam
- Siege of Dura Europos (256)

== Bibliography ==
=== Primary sources ===
- Zosimus. Historia Nova.

=== Secondary sources ===
- Al-Tabari, Abu Ja'far Muhammad ibn Jarir (1985–2007). Ehsan Yar-Shater (ed.). The History of Al-Ṭabarī. Vol. 40 vols. Albany, NY: State University of New York Press.
- Benjamin, Craig (2020). "The Kushan Empire". The Oxford World History of Empire. Vol. Two: The History of Empires. Oxford University Press. pp. 325–346. ISBN 9780197532775.
- Bonner, Michael (2020). The Last Empire of Iran. New York: Gorgias Press. pp. 1–406. ISBN 978-1-4632-0616-1.
- Brosius, Maria (2000). "Women i. In Pre-Islamic Persia". Encyclopaedia Iranica. London et al.
- Curtis, Vesta Sarkhosh; Stewart, Sarah (2008). The Sasanian Era. I.B. Tauris. pp. 1–200. ISBN 978-0-85771-972-0.
- Daryaee, Touraj (2014). Sasanian Persia: The Rise and Fall of an Empire. I.B.Tauris. pp. 1–240. ISBN 978-0-85771-666-8.
- Daryaee, Touraj (2010). "Ardashir and the Sasanians' Rise to Power". Anabasis. University of California: 236–255.
- Daryaee, Touraj (2012). "The Sasanian Empire". In Daryaee, Touraj (ed.). The Oxford Handbook of Iranian History. Oxford University Press. pp. 224–651. ISBN 978-0-19-973215-9.
- Daryaee, Touraj (2016). "From Terror to Tactical Usage: Elephants in the Partho-Sasanian Period". In Curtis, Vesta Sarkhosh; Pendleton, Elizabeth J.; Alram, Michael; Daryaee, Touraj (eds.). The Parthian and Early Sasanian Empires: Adaptation and Expansion. Oxbow Books. ISBN 978-1-78570-208-2.
- Daryaee, Touraj; Rezakhani, Khodadad (2017). "The Sasanian Empire". In Daryaee, Touraj (ed.). King of the Seven Climes: A History of the Ancient Iranian World (3000 BCE – 651 CE). UCI Jordan Center for Persian Studies. pp. 1–236. ISBN 978-0-692-86440-1.
- Daryaee, Touraj (2018). "Res Gestae Divi Saporis". In Nicholson, Oliver (ed.). The Oxford Dictionary of Late Antiquity. Oxford: Oxford University Press. ISBN 978-0-19-866277-8.
- Bowman, Alan K.; Cameron, Averil; Garnsey, Peter, eds. (2005). The Cambridge Ancient History, Volume XII: The Crisis of Empire, A.D. 193-337. Cambridge: Cambridge University Press. ISBN 978-0-5213-0199-2.
  - Drinkwater, John. "Maximinus to Diocletian and the 'Crisis'". In Bowman, Cameron & Garnsey (2005), pp. 28–66.
- Frye, R. N. (1993). "The Political History of Iran under the Sassanians". In Bayne Fisher, William; Gershevitch, Ilya; Yarshater, Ehsan; Frye, R. N.; Boyle, J. A.; Jackson, Peter; Lockhart, Laurence; Avery, Peter; Hambly, Gavin; Melville, Charles (eds.). The Cambridge History of Iran. Cambridge University Press. ISBN 0-521-20092-X.
- Frye, Richard Nelson (1984). The History of Ancient Iran. C.H. Beck. pp. 1–411. ISBN 978-3-406-09397-5.
- Frye, R.N. (2000) [First published 1983]. "The Political History of Iran under the Sasanians". In Yarshater, Ehsan (ed.). Cambridge History of Iran. Vol. 3, Part 1: The Seleucid, Parthian, and Sasanian periods. Cambridge University Press.
- Gignoux, Ph. (1983). "Ādur-Anāhīd". Encyclopaedia Iranica, Vol. I, Fasc. 5. London et al. p. 472.
- Gignoux, Philippe (1994). "Dēnag". Encyclopaedia Iranica, Vol. VII, Fasc. 3. p. 282.
- Grant, Michael (1985). The Roman Emperors: A Biographical Guide to the Rulers of Imperial Rome, 31BC-AD476. Orion Mass Market Paperback. ISBN 978-1842126523.
- Hartmann, Udo (2001). Das palmyrenische Teilreich (in German). ISBN 9783515078009.
- Henning, W. B. (1939). "The Great Inscription of Šāpūr I". Bulletin of the School of Oriental Studies. 9 (4). Cambridge University Press: 823–849. doi:10.1017/S0041977X00135001. JSTOR 607969.
- Kia, Mehrdad (2016). The Persian Empire: A Historical Encyclopedia. ABC-CLIO. ISBN 978-1-61069-391-2. (2 volumes)
- McDonough, Scott (2011). "The Legs of the Throne: Kings, Elites, and Subjects in Sasanian Iran". In Arnason, Johann P.; Raaflaub, Kurt A. (eds.). The Roman Empire in Context: Historical and Comparative Perspectives. John Wiley & Sons, Ltd. pp. 290–321. doi:10.1002/9781444390186.ch13. ISBN 978-1-4443-9018-6.
- McDonough, Scott (2013). "Military and Society in Sasanian Iran". In Campbell, Brian; Tritle, Lawrence A. (eds.). The Oxford Handbook of Warfare in the Classical World. Oxford University Press. pp. 1–783. ISBN 978-0-19-530465-7.
- Olbrycht, Marek Jan (2016). "Dynastic Connections in the Arsacid Empire and the Origins of the House of Sāsān". In Curtis, Vesta Sarkhosh; Pendleton, Elizabeth J.; Alram, Michael; Daryaee, Touraj (eds.). The Parthian and Early Sasanian Empires: Adaptation and Expansion. Oxbow Books. ISBN 978-1-78570-208-2.
- Pourshariati, Parvaneh (2008). Decline and Fall of the Sasanian Empire: The Sasanian-Parthian Confederacy and the Arab Conquest of Iran. London and New York: I.B. Tauris. ISBN 978-1-84511-645-3.
- Raditsa, Leo (2000) [First published 1983]. "Iranians in Asia Minor". In Yarshater, Ehsan (ed.). The Cambridge History of Iran. Vol. 3, Part 1: The Seleucid, Parthian and Sasanian Periods. Cambridge University Press. pp. 100–115.
- Rajabzadeh, Hashem (1993). "Dabīr". Encyclopaedia Iranica, Vol. VI, Fasc. 5. pp. 534–539.
- Rapp, Stephen H. (2014). The Sasanian World through Georgian Eyes: Caucasia and the Iranian Commonwealth in Late Antique Georgian Literature. Ashgate Publishing, Ltd. ISBN 978-1-4724-2552-2.
- Rezakhani, Khodadad (2017a). "From the Kushans to the Western Turks". In Daryaee, Touraj (ed.). King of the Seven Climes: A History of the Ancient Iranian World (3000 BCE – 651 CE). UCI Jordan Center for Persian Studies. pp. 199–227. ISBN 978-0-692-86440-1.
- Rezakhani, Khodadad (2017b). ReOrienting the Sasanians: East Iran in Late Antiquity. Edinburgh University Press. ISBN 978-1-4744-0030-5. JSTOR 10.3366/j.ctt1g04zr8.
- Southern, Pat (2001). "Beyond the Eastern Frontiers". The Roman Empire from Severus to Constantine. Routledge. ISBN 0-415-23943-5.
- Schindel, Nikolaus (2013). "Sasanian Coinage". In Potts, Daniel T. (ed.). The Oxford Handbook of Ancient Iran. Oxford University Press. ISBN 978-0-19-973330-9.
- Schippmann, K. (1986a). "Artabanus (Arsacid kings)". Encyclopaedia Iranica, Vol. II, Fasc. 6. pp. 647–650.
- Schippmann, K. (1986b). "Arsacids ii. The Arsacid dynasty". Encyclopaedia Iranica, Vol. II, Fasc. 5. pp. 525–536.
- Schmitt, R. (1986). "Artaxerxes". Encyclopaedia Iranica, Vol. II, Fasc. 6. pp. 654–655.
- Shahbazi, A. Shapur (1988). "Bahrām I". Encyclopaedia Iranica, Vol. III, Fasc. 5. pp. 514–522.
- Shahbazi, A. Shapur (2002). "Šāpur I". Encyclopaedia Iranica.
- Shahbazi, A. Shapur (2004). "Hormozdgān". Encyclopaedia Iranica, Vol. XII, Fasc. 5. pp. 469–470.
- Shahbazi, A. Shapur (2005). "Sasanian dynasty". Encyclopaedia Iranica, Online Edition.
- Shayegan, M. Rahim (2004). "Hormozd I". Encyclopaedia Iranica, Vol. XII, Fasc. 5. pp. 462–464.
- Shayegan, M. Rahim (2011). Arsacids and Sasanians: Political Ideology in Post-Hellenistic and Late Antique Persia. Cambridge University Press. ISBN 978-0-521-76641-8.
- Shayegan, M. Rahim (2013). "Sasanian Political Ideology". In Potts, Daniel T. (ed.). The Oxford Handbook of Ancient Iran. Oxford University Press. ISBN 978-0-19-973330-9.
- Skjærvø, Prods Oktor (2011). "Kartir". Encyclopaedia Iranica, Vol. XV, Fasc. 6. pp. 608–628.
- Southern, Pat (2008). Empress Zenobia: Palmyra s Rebel Queen. ISBN 9781847250346.
- Stausberg, Michael; Vevaina, Yuhan Sohrab-Dinshaw; Tessmann, Anna (2015). The Wiley Blackwell Companion to Zoroastrianism. John Wiley & Sons, Ltd.
- Stoneman, Richard; Erickson, Kyle; Netton, Ian Richard (2012). The Alexander Romance in Persia and the East. Barkhuis. ISBN 978-94-91431-04-3.
- Southern, Pat (2003). The Roman Empire from Severus to Constantine. Taylor & Francis.
- Vevaina, Yuhan; Canepa, Matthew (2018). "Ohrmazd". In Nicholson, Oliver (ed.). The Oxford Dictionary of Late Antiquity. Oxford: Oxford University Press. ISBN 978-0-19-866277-8.
- Weber, Ursula (2016). "Narseh". Encyclopaedia Iranica.
- Wiesehöfer, Josef (1986). "Ardašīr I i. History". Encyclopaedia Iranica, Vol. II, Fasc. 4. pp. 371–376.
- Wiesehöfer, Josef (2000b). "Frataraka". Encyclopaedia Iranica, Vol. X, Fasc. 2. p. 195.
- Wiesehöfer, Josef (2000a). "Fārs ii. History in the Pre-Islamic Period". Encyclopaedia Iranica.
- Wiesehöfer, Josef (2001). Ancient Persia. I.B. Tauris. ISBN 978-1-86064-675-1.
- Wiesehöfer, Josef (2009). "Persis, Kings of". Encyclopaedia Iranica.

Shapur I Sasanian dynasty Died: May 270
Preceded by Ardashir I	King of Kings of Iran and non-Iran; 240–270	Succeeded by Hormizd I
