= Khwarranzem =

3rd-century Sasanian queen

Khwarranzem (Middle Persian: Xwarranzēm) (also known as Chornanzem, Xwarnanzem) was a 3rd-century Sasanian queen (banbishn), married to Ardashir I or to Shapur I.

== Biography ==
The origins of her name is unknown, the name seems to suggest an Armenian or Georgian background. She is mentioned in Shapur I's inscription at the Ka'ba-ye Zartosht, where she is holding the title of shahr banbishn ("Queen of the empire"). According to the same inscription, she was the mother of a certain Gorazdukht.

Her husband is the subject of dispute amongst scholars; according to some, she was the wife of Ardashir I (r. 224–242), whilst others suggests that she was the wife of Ardashir's son and successor Shapur I (r. 240–270) and the mother of the latter's son and heir Hormizd I (r. 270–271). She may have been the same person as Gurdzad, who is mentioned as the wife of Shapur by the 10th-century historian Hamza al-Isfahani.

== Sources ==
- Sundermann, W. (1988). "BĀNBIŠN". In Yarshater, Ehsan (ed.). Encyclopædia Iranica. Vol. III/7: Banān–Bardesanes. London and New York: Routledge & Kegan Paul. pp. 678–679. ISBN 978-0-71009-119-2.
