= Sasanian Khwarazm =

Period of Sasanian suzerainty over Khwarazm

Khwarazm Xwarāzm
- Province of the Sasanian Empire
- 242–c. 350
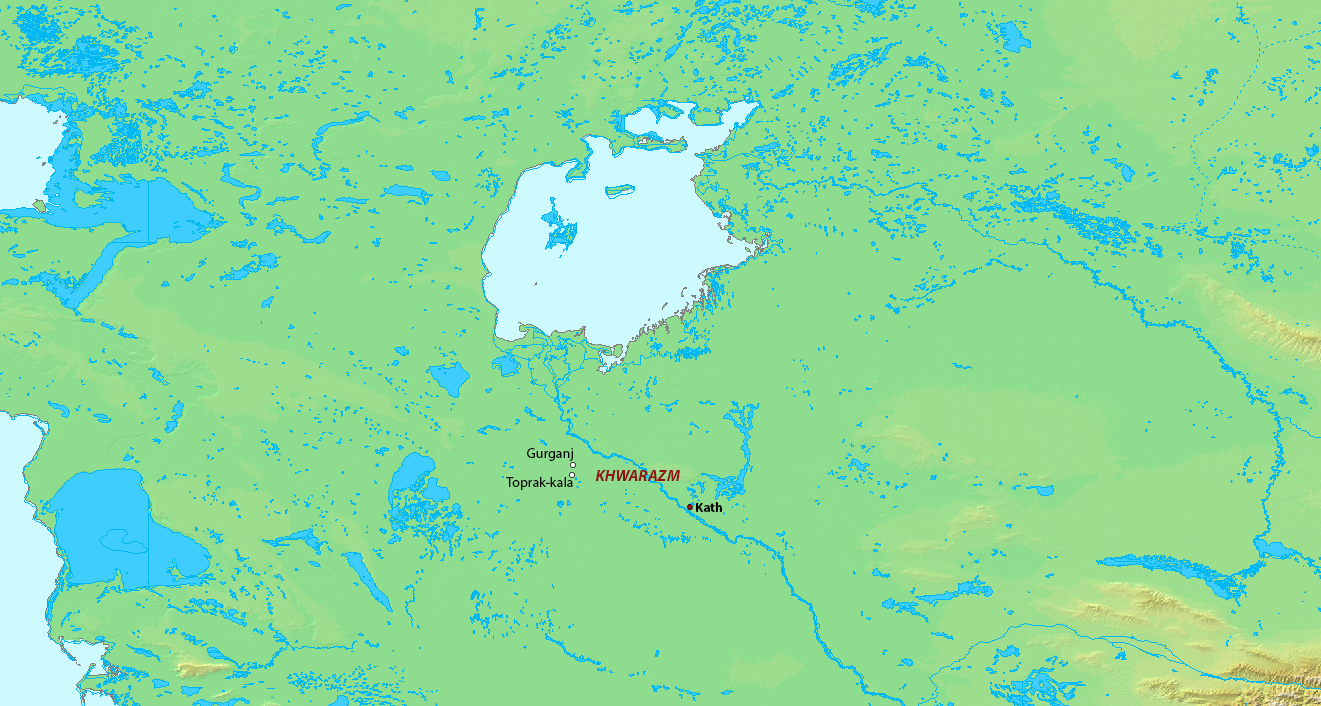
- Capital: Kath
- Historical era: Antiquity
  - Conquest by Shapur I: 242
- 242
  - Xionites conquest: c. 350
Succeeded by
Xionites
- Today part of: Kazakhstan; Turkmenistan; Uzbekistan

Sasanian Khwarazm (Middle Persian: Xwarāzm) refers to the period that the ancient civilization of Khwarazm was under the suzerainty of the Sasanian Empire from 242 to its conquest by the nomadic Xionites in c. 350.

== Sources ==
- Brunner, Christopher (1983). "Geographical and Administrative divisions: Settlements and Economy". The Cambridge History of Iran: The Seleucid, Parthian, and Sasanian periods (2). Cambridge: Cambridge University Press. pp. 747–778. ISBN 978-0-521-24693-4.
- Frye, Richard N. (1983). "The political history of Iran under the Sasanians". The Cambridge History of Iran: The Seleucid, Parthian, and Sasanian periods (1). Cambridge: Cambridge University Press. pp. 116–181. ISBN 978-0-521-24693-4.
