= Shapurdukhtak of Sakastan =

Late 3rd/early 4th-century Sasanian queen

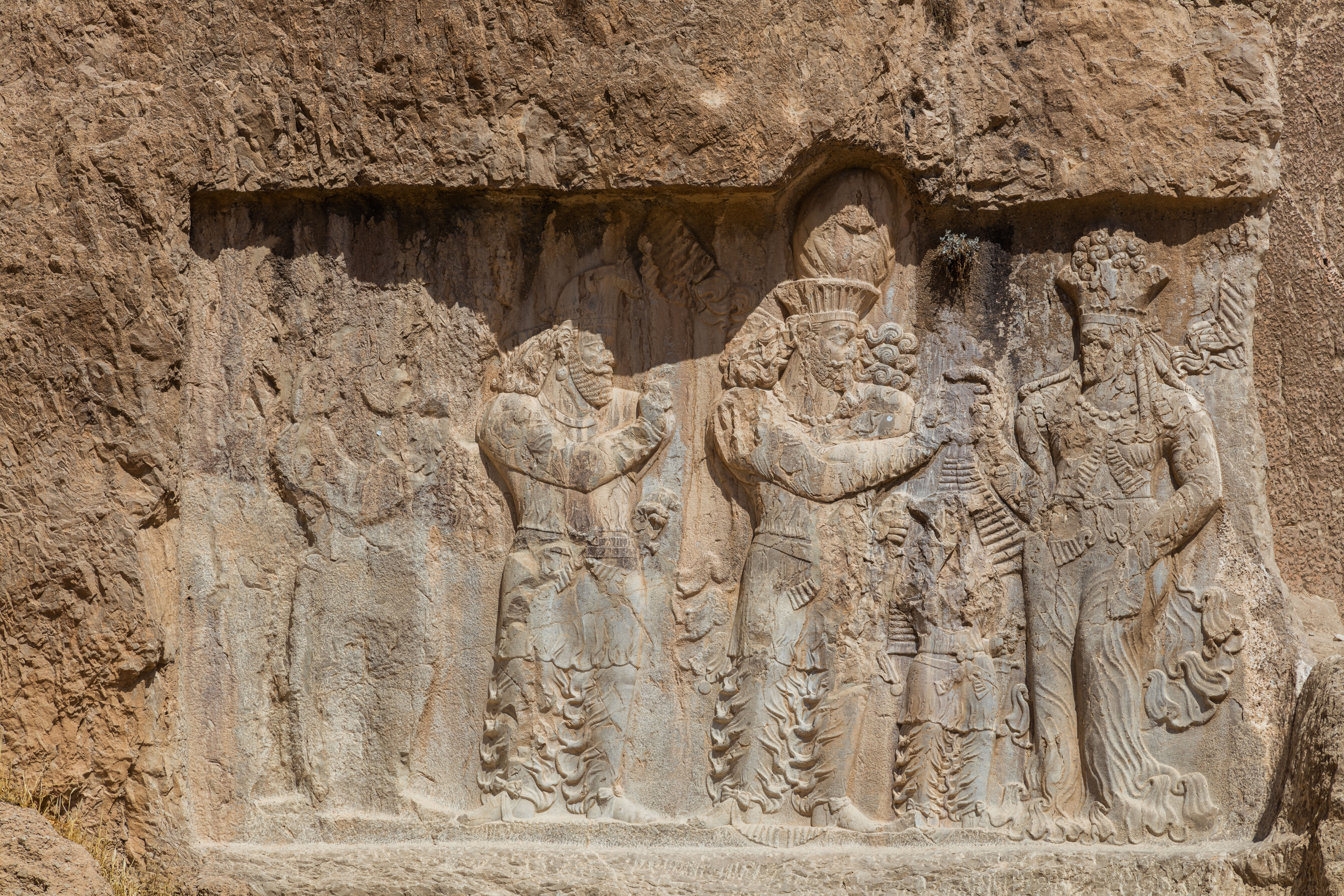
Naqsh-e Rostam relief of Narseh receiving the ring of kingship from a female figure, believed by some scholars to be the goddess Anahita, whilst others have proposed Shapurdukhtak.

Shapurdukhtak (Middle Persian: Šābuhrduxtag, literally "daughter of Shapur"), also known as Shapurdukhtak II, was a Sasanian queen (banbishn) in the late 3rd and early 4th-centuries, who was the wife of the Sasanian king (shah) Narseh (r. 293–302). She has been suggested to be the daughter of shah Shapur I (r. 240–270), however, this is disputed.

She is mentioned in the inscription at Ka'ba-ye Zartosht written in c. 262. She held the title of sagan banbishn ("Queen of the Saka"), due to her husband Narseh serving as governor of Sakastan at that time. When Narseh ascended the throne in 293, he had an investiture relief made in Naqsh-e Rostam, where he is depicted as receiving the ring of kingship from a female figure that is frequently assumed to be the goddess Anahita. However, some scholars have suggested that this may be his queen, Shapurdukhtak.

== Sources ==
- Brosius, Maria (2000). "Women i. In Pre-Islamic Persia". Encyclopaedia Iranica, Vol. London et al.
- Choksy, Jamsheed K. (1989). "A Sasanian Monarch, his queen, crown prince, and deities: The coinage of Wahram II". American Numismatic Society. 1: 117–135. JSTOR 43580158. (registration required)
- Gardner, Iain (2014). Mani at the Court of the Persian Kings: Studies on the Chester Beatty Kephalaia Codex. BRILL. pp. 1–332. ISBN 9789004282629.
- Weber, Ursula (2016). "Narseh". Encyclopaedia Iranica.
