= Banbishn =

Middle Persian title

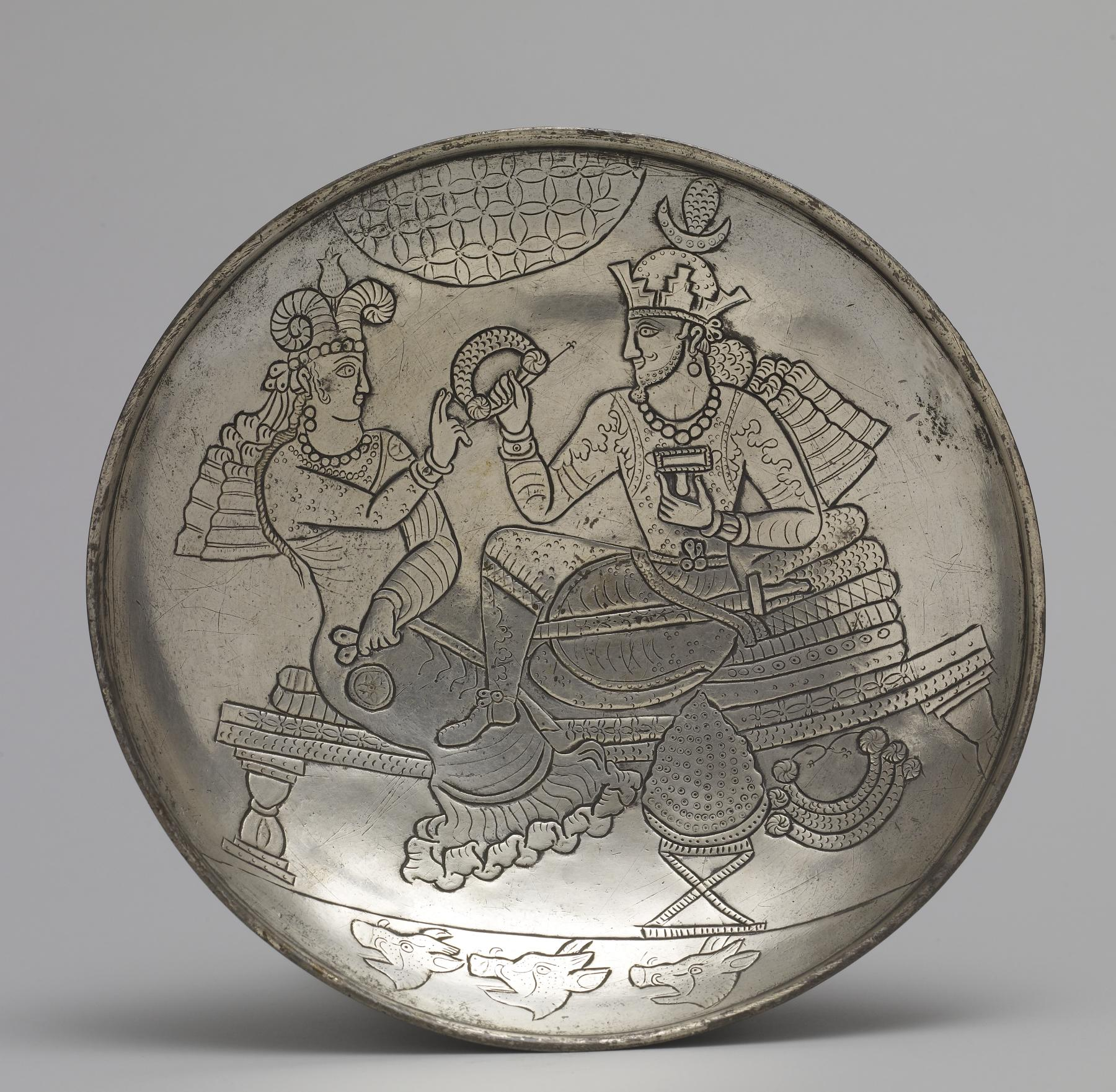
6th–7th century Sasanian plate of a queen and king seated on a throne, possibly at a wedding.

Bānbishn was a Middle Persian title meaning "queen", and was held by royal women in Sasanian Iran who were the king's daughters and sisters, and also by the consorts of the Sasanian princes that ruled parts of the country as governors. The full version of the title was bānbishnān bānbishn ("Queen of Queens").

== Etymology ==
Although the Old Persian form of bānbishn is not found in any source, it was most likely spelled māna-pashnī, matching the Avestan dəmąnō.paθnī ("mistress"), which is from Old Iranian dmāna-paθnī. The word was later absorbed into the Armenian language, where it was spelled bambishn. The Sogdian version of the word is bāmbusht.

== History ==
In the Sasanian inscriptions, banbishn is the female equivalent of shah (king). The title is first attested in 262/3 in Shapur I's inscription at the Ka'ba-ye Zartosht, being held by a certain Denak. Shapur I's daughter Adur-Anahid held the title of bānbishnān bānbishn ("Queen of Queens"), which matched the title of shahanshah ("King of Kings"). Other titles related to banbishn were; shahr banbishn ("Queen of the empire"), held by Shapur I's wife Khwarranzem; sagan banbishn ("Queen of the Sakas") held by Shapurdukhtak, the wife of Narseh; and Meshan banbishn ("Queen of Meshan"), held by another Denak, the wife of Shapur Meshanshah.

The wife of Yazdegerd II (r. 438–457), Denag, temporarily ruled as regent of the empire from its capital, Ctesiphon during the dynastic struggle for the throne between her sons Hormizd III (r. 457–459) and Peroz I (r. 459–484), which displays that royal women could occupy political offices in the management of the country. Marriage was not restricted to Iranian women only−Bahram V Gor (r. 420–438) reportedly married an Indian princess named Sapinud, whilst Khosrow II (r. 591–628) married two Christian women of non-Iranian descent, Shirin and Maria. During the Sasanian civil war of 628–632, two Sasanian queens, Boran (r. 629–630, 631–632) and Azarmidokht (r. 630–631), both daughters of Khosrow II, ruled the empire for a brief period.

The title was used also in Parthian texts as bʾnbyšn which is the Manichaean Middle Persian form of bānbishn.

== Sources ==
- Sundermann, W. (1988). "BĀNBIŠN". In Yarshater, Ehsan (ed.). Encyclopædia Iranica. Vol. III/7: Banān–Bardesanes. London and New York: Routledge & Kegan Paul. pp. 678–679. ISBN 978-0-71009-119-2.
- Brosius, Maria (2000). "WOMEN i. In Pre-Islamic Persia". In Yarshater, Ehsan (ed.). Encyclopædia Iranica (Online ed.). Encyclopædia Iranica Foundation.
- Kia, Mehrdad (2016). The Persian Empire: A Historical Encyclopedia [2 volumes]: A Historical Encyclopedia. ABC-CLIO. ISBN 978-1610693912.
