= Bangestan =

Bangestan بنگستان
- Village
- Location within Iran
- Coordinates: 31°17′16″N 49°38′43″E
- Country: Iran
- Province: Khuzestan
- County: Ramhormoz
- Bakhsh: Central
- Rural District: Howmeh-ye Sharqi

Population (2006)
  - Total: 264
- Time zone: UTC+3:30 (IRST)
  - Summer (DST): UTC+4:30 (IRDT)

Bangestan (Persian: بنگستان, also Romanized as Bangestān; also known as Bangestān-e Bālā and Tangestān) is a village in Howmeh-ye Sharqi Rural District, in the Central District of Ramhormoz County, Khuzestan Province, Iran. At the 2006 census, its population was 264, in 53 families.
